= Death and state funeral of Elizabeth II =

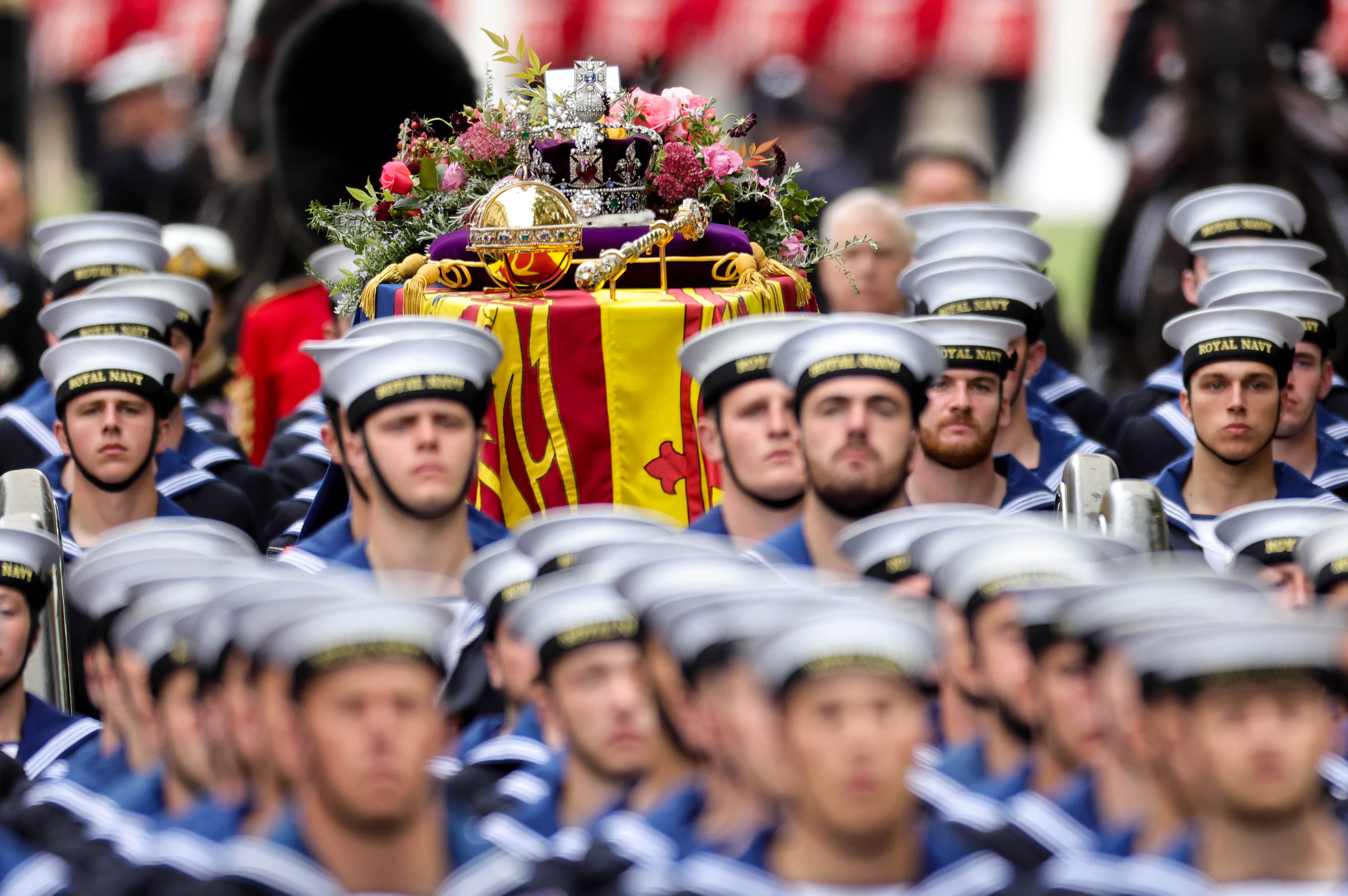
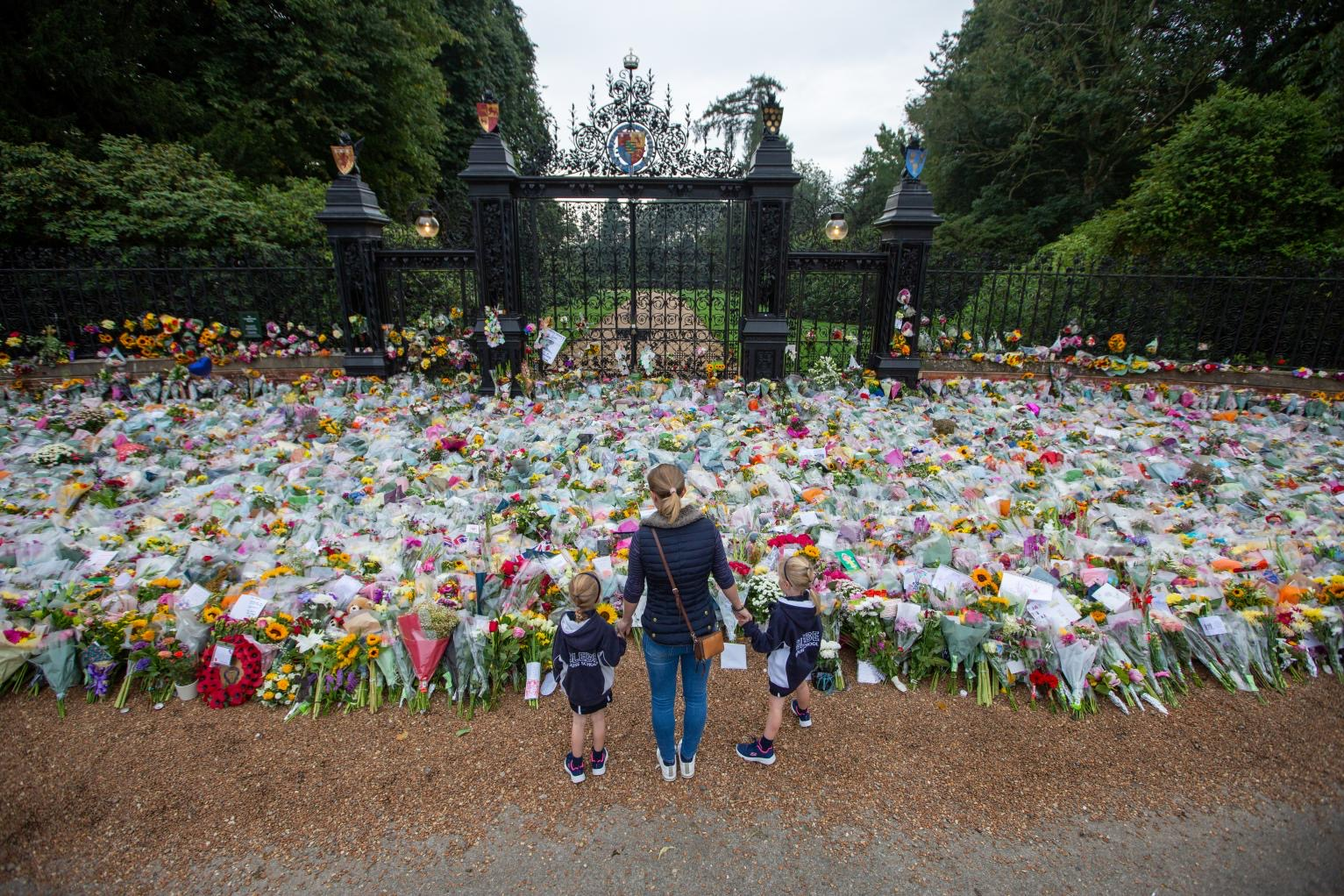
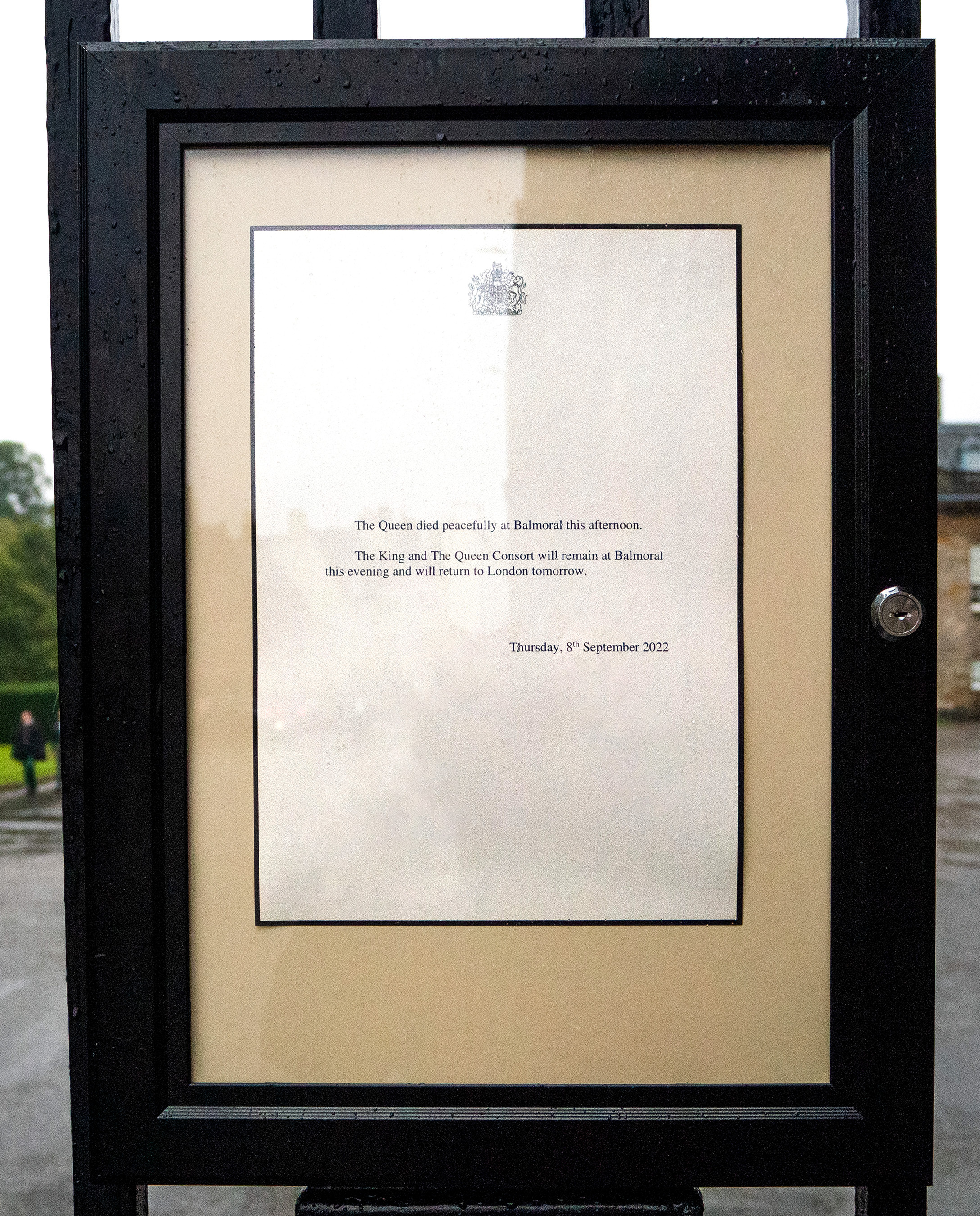
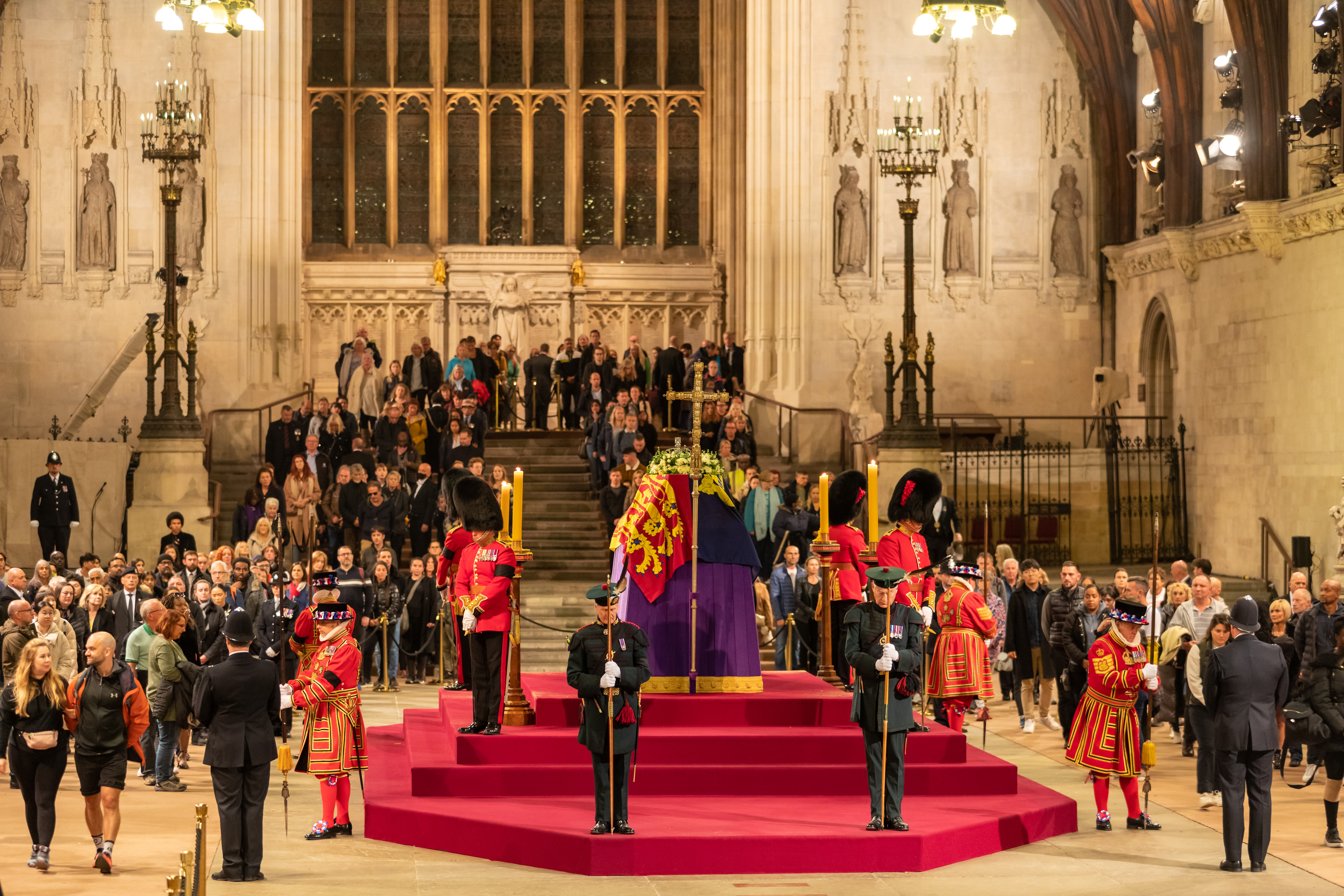
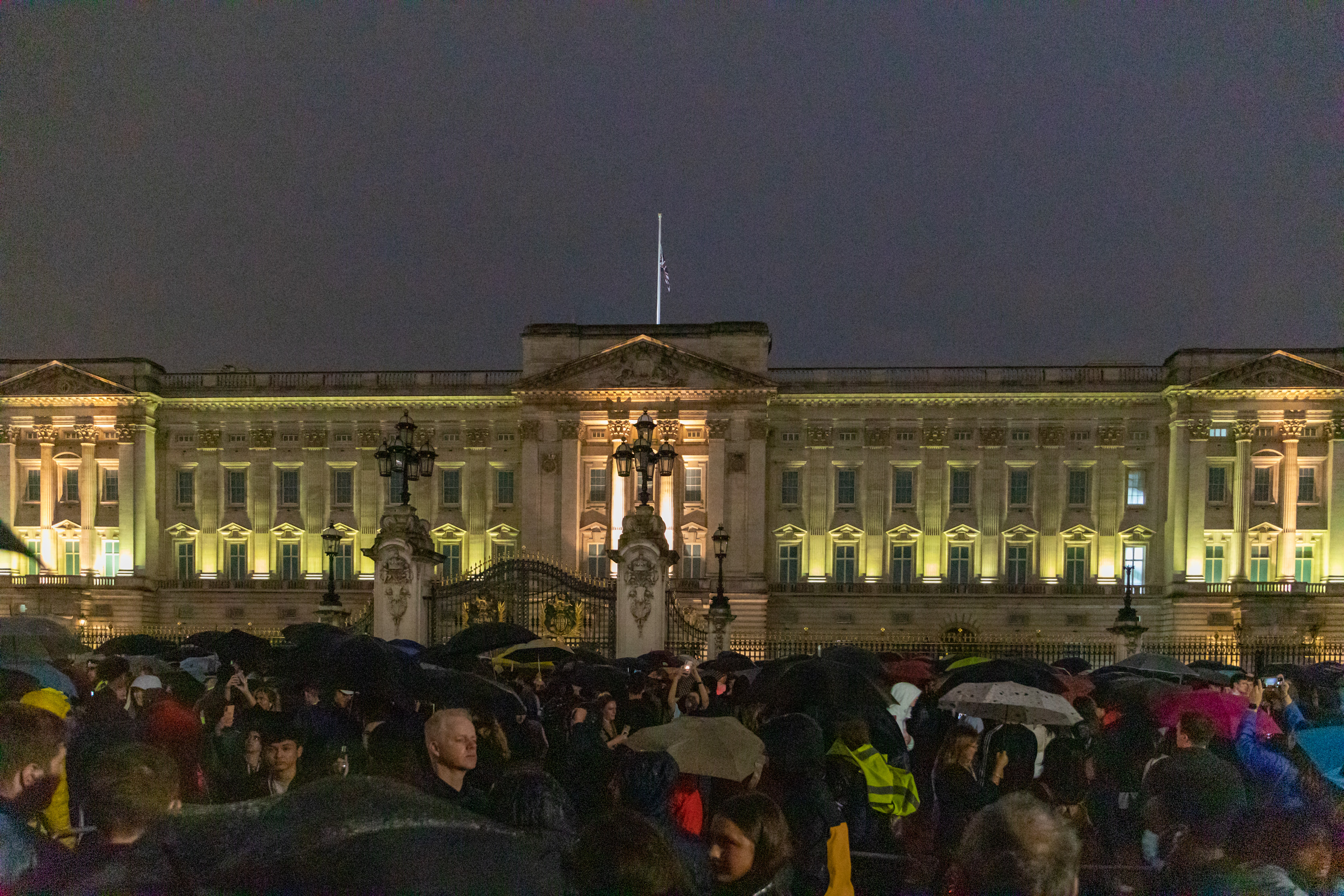
- Top to bottom, left to right: The Queen's funeral cortege on the State Gun Carriage to Westminster Abbey; Floral tributes left outside the Sandringham Estate; Notice of the Queen's death posted at Holyrood Palace; Elizabeth II lying in state at Westminster Hall; People mourning following the Queen's death outside of Buckingham Palace
- Date: 8 September 2022, 15:10 (BST) (death); 12–13 September 2022 (lying at rest); 14–19 September 2022 (lying-in-state); 19 September 2022 (state funeral and committal)
- Location: Balmoral Castle, Aberdeenshire (death); St Giles' Cathedral, Edinburgh (lying at rest); Westminster Hall, London (lying-in-state); Westminster Abbey, London (state funeral); King George VI Memorial Chapel, St George's Chapel, Windsor Castle (committal); 57°2′27″N 3°13′48″W
- Budget: £162 million
- Participants: List of dignitaries at the state funeral

Elizabeth II, Queen of the United Kingdom and other Commonwealth realms, died on 8 September 2022 at Balmoral Castle in Scotland, at the age of 96. Elizabeth's reign of 70 years and 214 days is the longest of any British monarch and the second-longest of any monarch in the world besides Louis XIV. She was immediately succeeded by her eldest child, Charles III.

Elizabeth's death set in motion the final version of Operation London Bridge, a funeral plan first devised in the 1960s, and Operation Unicorn, the plan for the Queen's death in Scotland. Elizabeth's coffin lay at rest in St Giles' Cathedral in Edinburgh from 12 to 13 September, after which it was flown to London, where it lay in state in Westminster Hall from 14 to 19 September. An estimated 33,000 people filed past the Queen's coffin in Edinburgh, and approximately 250,000 people queued to pay their respects in London. The United Kingdom observed a national mourning period of 10 days.

Elizabeth's state funeral on 19 September was the first held in Britain since Winston Churchill's in 1965. A funeral service was held at Westminster Abbey, followed by a procession to Wellington Arch which featured around 3,000 military personnel and was watched by approximately one million people in central London. The state hearse then transported the Queen's coffin to Windsor, followed by another procession through Windsor Great Park and a committal service at St George's Chapel at Windsor Castle. The Queen was interred later that evening with her husband, Prince Philip, in the King George VI Memorial Chapel, in a private service attended only by her closest family.

Designated as a public holiday in the UK and several Commonwealth countries, the state funeral included dignitaries from around the world and featured the largest security operation ever mounted in the UK. Coverage of the state funeral was one of the UK's most watched special television broadcasts, surpassing the wedding of Prince William and Catherine Middleton, the previous most-watched royal event of the 21st century. The period of official mourning and the funeral was estimated to have cost the government £162 million.

== Background ==
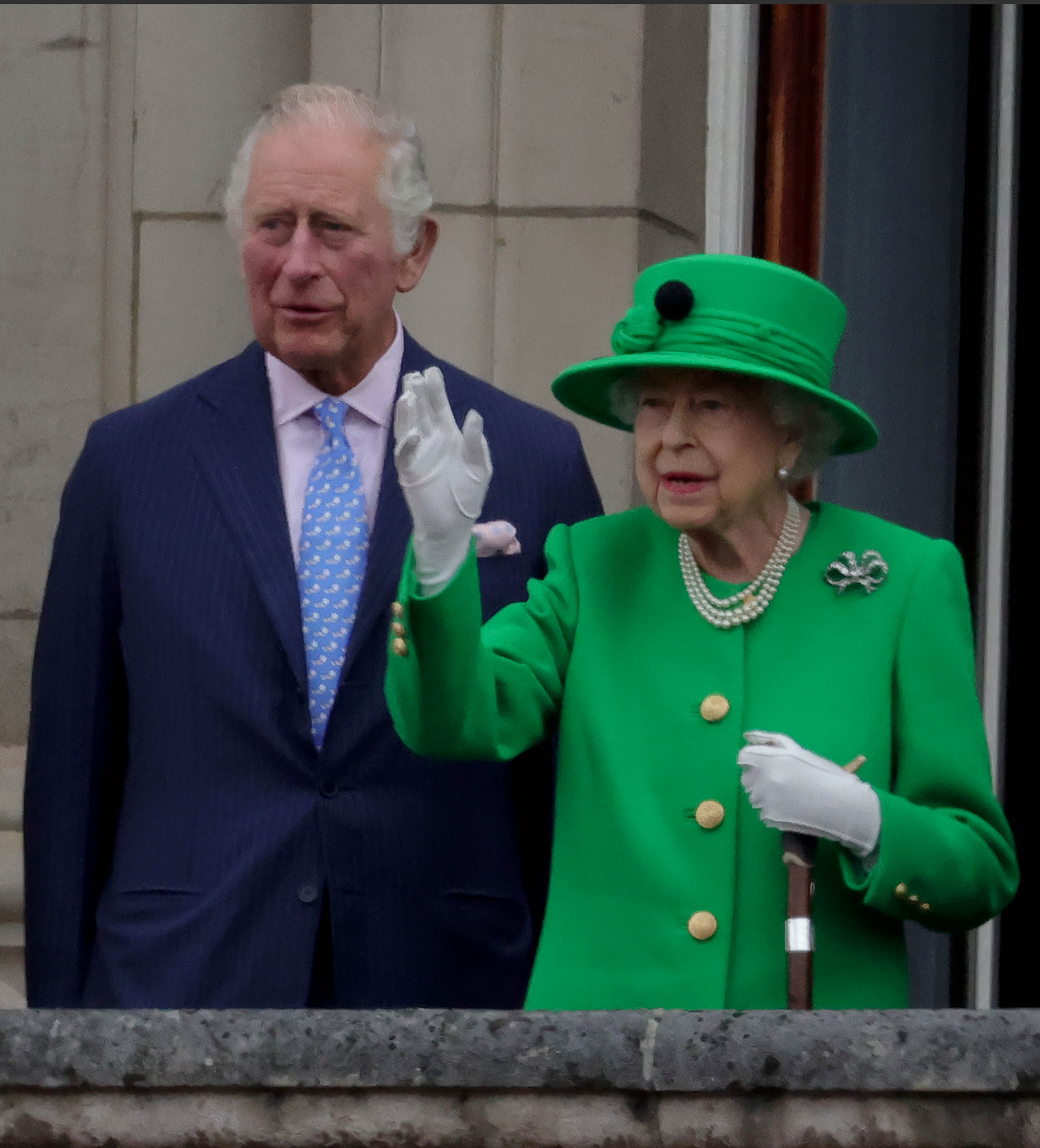
Elizabeth II with her eldest son, Charles, on the balcony of Buckingham Palace during the Platinum Jubilee celebrations, June 2022

Queen Elizabeth II was in good health for most of her life, but her health declined significantly following the death of her husband, Prince Philip, Duke of Edinburgh, in April 2021. She began to use a walking stick for public engagements in October 2021. On 20 October, the Queen stayed overnight in King Edward VII's Hospital in central London, necessitating the cancellation of scheduled visits to Northern Ireland and the COP26 summit in Glasgow. She suffered a sprained back in November, which prevented her from attending the 2021 National Service of Remembrance.

In February 2022, the Queen was one of several people at Windsor Castle to test positive for COVID-19. Her symptoms were described as "mild and cold-like", and she later commented that the disease "does leave one very tired and exhausted". The monarch's health became a cause of concern to commentators at this time.

The Queen was said to be feeling well enough to resume her official duties by 1 March 2022 and attended the service of thanksgiving for Prince Philip at Westminster Abbey on 29 March. Despite this, the Queen did not attend several appointments over the following months owing to "episodic mobility problems", including the annual Commonwealth Day service in March, the Royal Maundy service in April, the State Opening of Parliament in May, and the National Service of Thanksgiving for her Platinum Jubilee in June. During the Jubilee the Queen also suffered "discomfort" after standing during Trooping the Colour and was largely confined to balcony appearances during the celebrations. According to her apothecary in Scotland, Douglas Glass, there had been private concerns about her health for several months before her death; he was quoted in a later biography as saying "It was expected and we were quite aware of what was going to happen."

In an interview on BBC Radio 2 in November 2026, Simon Farnaby revealed that during filming of a sketch with Paddington Bear for her Jubilee, the Queen was very hard of hearing and could only see two feet in front of her. She therefore did not recognise him despite her secretary telling him that she liked Horrible Histories.

Two days before her death, the Queen accepted the resignation of Boris Johnson and appointed Liz Truss to succeed him as Prime Minister; these meetings took place at Balmoral Castle, rather than their usual location, Buckingham Palace. At the meeting with Truss, the final public photos of the Queen were taken by Jane Barlow. A bruise on her hand prompted public concern. Following the meeting the Queen's private secretary, Edward Young, privately informed Truss that the Queen might not live for much longer. He had also previously informed Johnson that regarding her health, the Queen had "gone down quite a bit over the summer" and later told him that the Queen knew she was dying throughout that summer. On 7 September, the Queen was scheduled to attend an online meeting of the Privy Council to swear in new ministers in Truss's government, but this was cancelled after she was advised by doctors to rest. The Queen's final public statement, issued that same day, was a message of condolences for the victims of a mass stabbing incident in Saskatchewan, Canada.

== Death and national mourning ==
=== Death and announcement ===
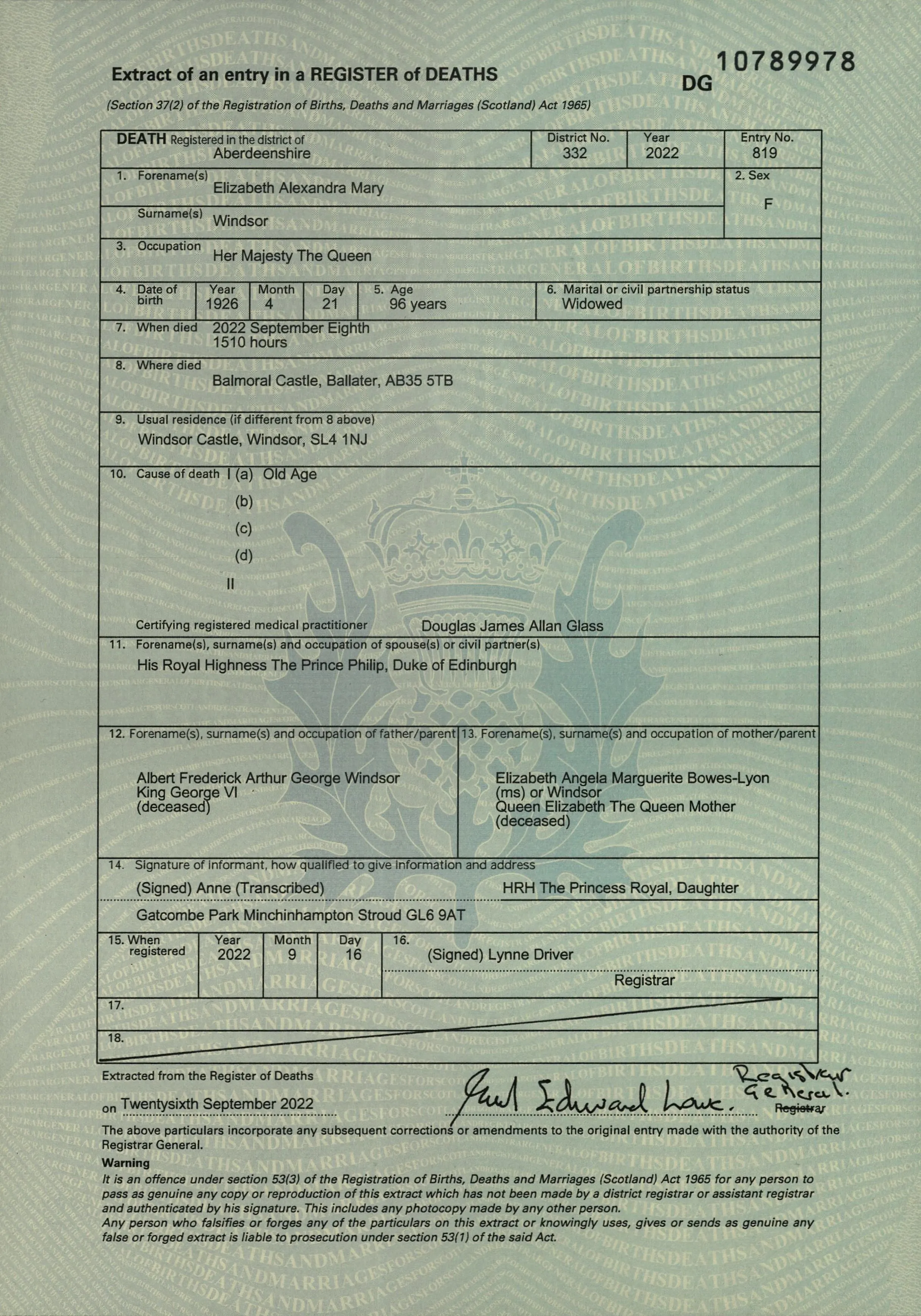
Death certificate issued for Elizabeth II

Queen Elizabeth II died at 15:10 BST on 8 September 2022 at the age of 96. Her death certificate, which was made public on 29 September, recorded her cause of death as old age. Her former prime minister Boris Johnson and the biographer Gyles Brandreth claim that she was suffering from a form of bone marrow cancer, which Brandreth wrote was multiple myeloma. Her death was publicly announced at 18:30. Elizabeth II was the first monarch to die in Scotland since James V in 1542.

Members of the royal family travelled to Balmoral Castle throughout the day. Prince Charles arrived at 10:30 and was met by Princess Anne, who was already staying with the Queen. Camilla, Duchess of Cornwall, also travelled to Balmoral from the Birkhall estate. Charles and Camilla spent an hour with the Queen and he was later informed of his mother's death as he was driving on the Balmoral estate. Prince William, Prince Andrew, Prince Edward, and Sophie, Countess of Wessex, left RAF Northolt on a flight to Aberdeen Airport and arrived at Balmoral shortly after 17:00; Prince Harry, who had travelled alone and departed later than the other family members, arrived at Balmoral at 20:00; Catherine, Duchess of Cambridge, and Meghan, Duchess of Sussex, did not join them.

Prime Minister Liz Truss is believed to have been informed of the Queen's declining health that morning by the Cabinet Secretary, Simon Case, and received an update at 12:00. The Leader of the Opposition, Sir Keir Starmer, was informed by a note passed to him by Deputy Leader Angela Rayner during a speech he was giving in the House of Commons. (Note: The note said: "The Queen is unwell and Keir needs to leave the chamber as soon as possible to be briefed.") At 12:30, Buckingham Palace made a public announcement expressing concern for the Queen's health; the Speaker, Sir Lindsay Hoyle, made a brief statement of good wishes in response. (Note: The statement read: "Following further evaluation this morning, the Queen's doctors are concerned for Her Majesty's health and have recommended she remain under medical supervision. The Queen remains comfortable and at Balmoral.")

Truss was informed at 16:30 that the Queen had died, and the royal family announced her death two hours later via newswires and a post on Twitter. A notice with the same statement was affixed to the railings outside Buckingham Palace and posted on the royal family website. The announcement read:

The Queen died peacefully at Balmoral this afternoon. The King and The Queen Consort will remain at Balmoral this evening and will return to London tomorrow.

External videos
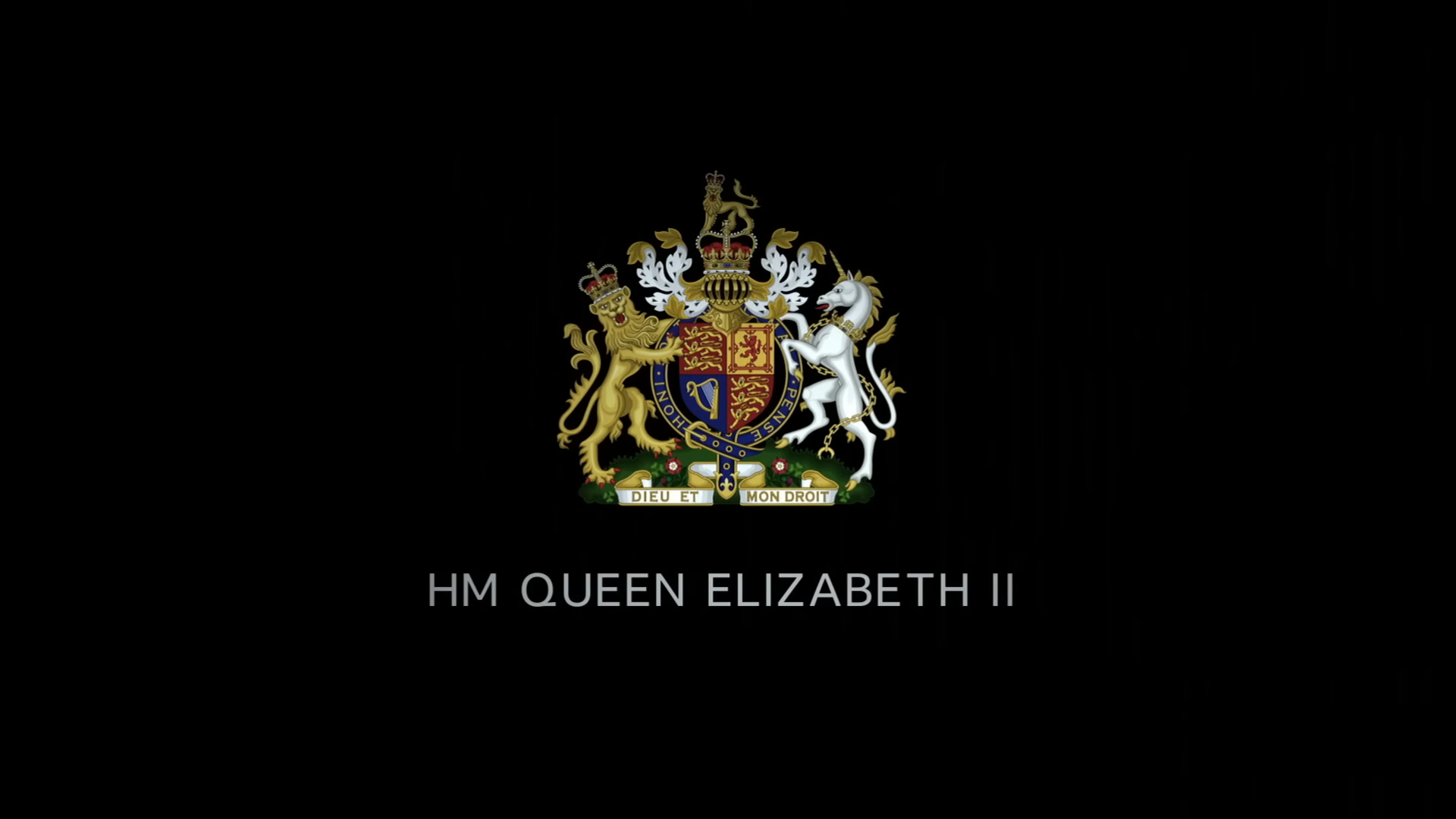
- Announcement of the death of the Queen on the BBC's television channels read by Huw Edwards

BBC One joined the BBC News channel at 12:40, cutting short an encore episode of Bargain Hunt, and continuously covered the Queen's condition from that point after the first official statement; special reports were also run on ITV (starting at 18:00). British television announcements of the Queen's death began at 18:31, when news presenter Huw Edwards read the royal family's statement during a live broadcast on the BBC News channel, which aired simultaneously on BBC One and BBC Two. The latter was broadcasting live coverage the 2022 Diamond League finals at the time and had to leave the broadcast at the start of the womens 3000 metres steeplechase race to report the news. All programmes on BBC Three and BBC Four were cancelled. The news also affected ITV1 (which was mid-bulletin at the time), Channel 4 (which saw an episode of Hollyoaks cut short), and Channel 5 (the news of the Queen's death broke during an extended newscast). At 18:32 the presenters of BBC Radio 4 and BBC Radio 5 Live made similar announcements. At around 18:36 all BBC Radio stations had either handed over to Radio 4, or had programmes forcibly cut short, with the network-wide simulcast beginning with a news report read by Chris Aldridge to announce the Queen's death. 5 Live resumed transmission later that night, and others remained suspended until the morning. Many other radio stations were put on standby for 'obituary mode' from 14:00, with special features being suspended. Normal programming was then stopped beginning at 18:30, with Global's stations all joining LBC until 22:00 when all stations resumed broadcasting. All Capital, Heart and Smooth spin-off brands and regional stations were flipped to the main network services prior for the announcement from Global's Newsroom. All of Bauer's stations (including Hits Radio, Magic, KISS, Absolute Radio and Greatest Hits Radio) aired a network-wide news report at different times. All stations were then required to revert to a more toned-down playlist, with easy-listening music being played throughout the weekend, and presenters looking back at the life of the Queen, and sharing their memories of the late monarch. Normal playlists started to resume around early-evening on Saturday. Capital and Heart's weekly Big Top 40 show was also cancelled for that week.

Following the announcement, the Union flags at Buckingham Palace and 10 Downing Street were lowered to half-mast. At Balmoral Castle, the Royal Standard of the United Kingdom was lowered and then, because the new king was present, was raised again. The Royal Banner of Scotland was lowered to half-mast at the Palace of Holyroodhouse, as was the Welsh flag at Cardiff Castle. Crowds gathered outside royal residences, where a double rainbow was seen over Windsor Castle and Buckingham Palace.

At 13:00 the next day, 9 September, a death gun salute of 96 rounds representing the years of the Queen's life were fired by the King's Troop, Royal Horse Artillery in Hyde Park, London, by the Honourable Artillery Company at the Tower of London and by 105th Regiment Royal Artillery at Edinburgh Castle. Simultaneous salutes were fired at British Army garrisons at Belfast, Cardiff, York, Colchester, Stirling, Gibraltar and Larkhill; also on Royal Navy warships at sea and at naval bases.

=== Scottish events ===
As the Queen had died in Scotland, Operation Unicorn was the first part of Operation London Bridge to take effect. Her body was taken to Edinburgh, where ceremonies were held, then to London for the state funeral.

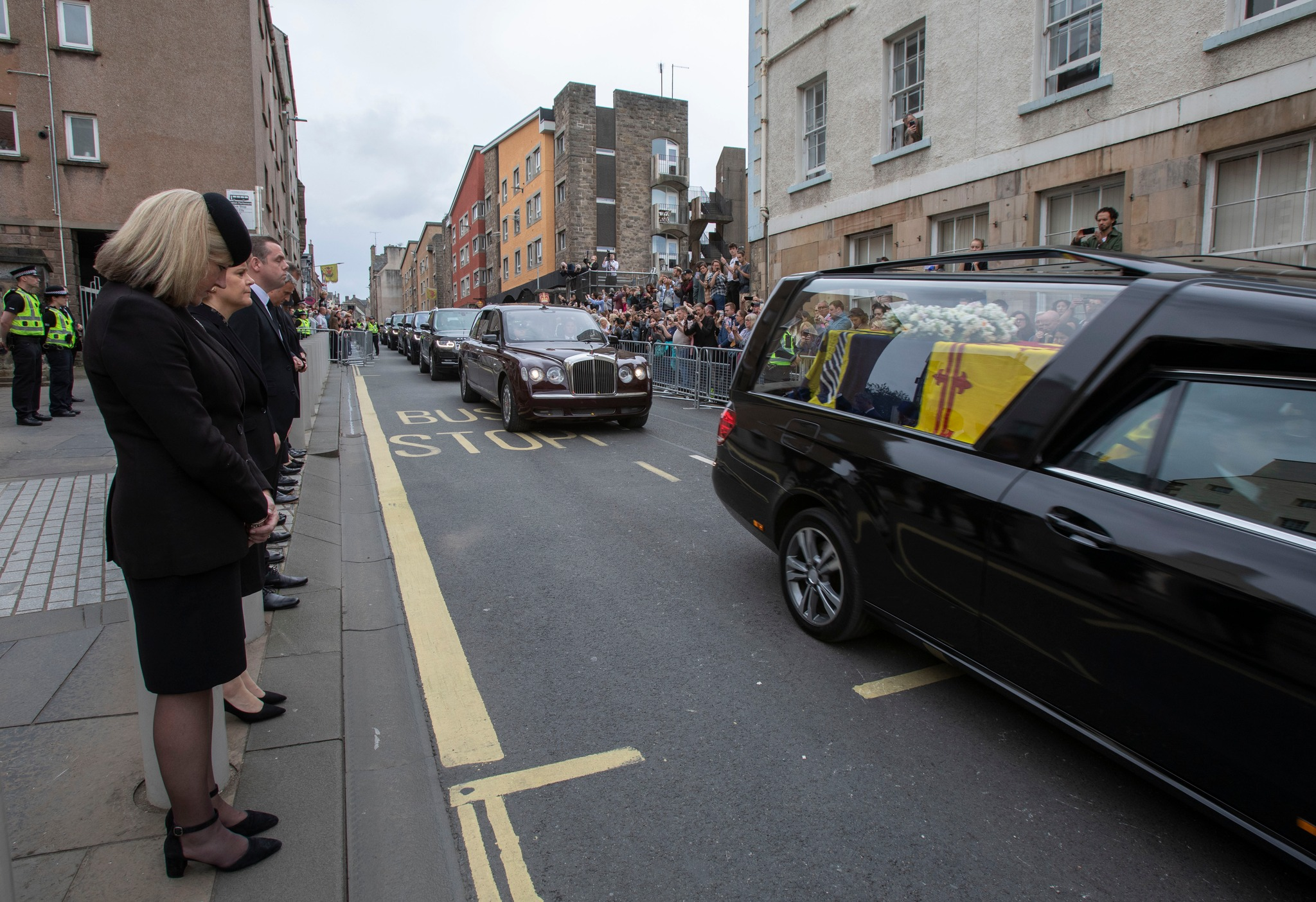
A hearse specially provided by William Purves transporting Elizabeth II's coffin arrives in Edinburgh en route to the Palace of Holyroodhouse on 11 September

The Queen's coffin left Balmoral Castle at 10:46 on 11 September, draped with the Scottish version of the Royal Standard of the United Kingdom and topped with a wreath of flowers from the castle gardens. (Note: The flowers were dahlia, sweet pea, phlox, white heather, and pine fir.) The journey of the cortege, which included Princess Anne and her husband Sir Timothy Laurence, was 175 miles (282 km) long and passed through Aberdeenshire, Aberdeen, Angus, Dundee, Perth and Kinross, and Fife. People lined the route of the cortege to pay their respects, and in Aberdeenshire farmers formed a guard of honour of tractors. The cortege reached the Palace of Holyroodhouse at 16:23 and the coffin was placed in the Throne Room. The coffin, which had been commissioned about 30 years before her death, was made from oak and was lined with lead, reportedly weighing 245 kg (540 lb).

On 12 September the coffin was carried up the Royal Mile to St Giles' Cathedral, in a procession that included King Charles III, Princess Anne and Sir Timothy Laurence, Prince Andrew, Prince Edward, the Bearer Party from the Royal Regiment of Scotland, and the Royal Company of Archers. Queen Camilla and Sophie, then known as Countess of Wessex and Forfar, followed closely in their car. Guns were fired every minute from Edinburgh Castle during the procession. On arrival the coffin was carried into the cathedral, and the Crown of Scotland was placed on it.

A service of thanksgiving was then held to celebrate the Queen's life and to highlight her association with Scotland. The service was led by the minister of St Giles' Cathedral, Calum Macleod, and the homily given by the Moderator of the General Assembly of the Church of Scotland, Iain Greenshields. (Note: The opening hymn of the service was "All People that on Earth do Dwell", the metrical version of Psalm 100. Matheson sang Psalm 118. The first lesson was taken from Ecclesiastes 3. The choir then sang Psalm 116 before the second reading from Romans 8. The second hymn was "The Lord's My Shepherd", which was followed by the gospel reading from John 14. Following the homily, the choir sang William Byrd's anthem "Justorum Animae". After several prayers were said, the closing hymn, "Glory to God! Our living songs we raise", was sung, followed by the national anthem and the benediction.) Psalm 118 was sung in Gaelic by Karen Matheson. It was attended by the royal party; politicians, including Liz Truss and First Minister of Scotland Nicola Sturgeon; and representatives from the Queen's Scottish charities and organisations.

The coffin lay at rest at the cathedral for 24 hours, guarded by the Royal Company of Archers, which allowed around 33,000 people to file past it. In the evening King Charles, Princess Anne, Prince Andrew, and Prince Edward held a vigil at the cathedral, a custom known as the Vigil of the Princes; Princess Anne was the first woman to participate in such an event.

On 13 September the coffin was taken by hearse to Edinburgh Airport and flown to RAF Northolt on a Royal Air Force C-17 Globemaster, accompanied by Princess Anne and Sir Timothy Laurence. The Royal Air Force Bearer Party carried the coffin onto the aircraft and a Guard of Honour was formed by the Royal Regiment of Scotland. During the journey the Scottish version of the Royal Standard that draped the coffin was replaced by the Royal Standard that is used in the rest of the United Kingdom.

=== Lying-in-state ===
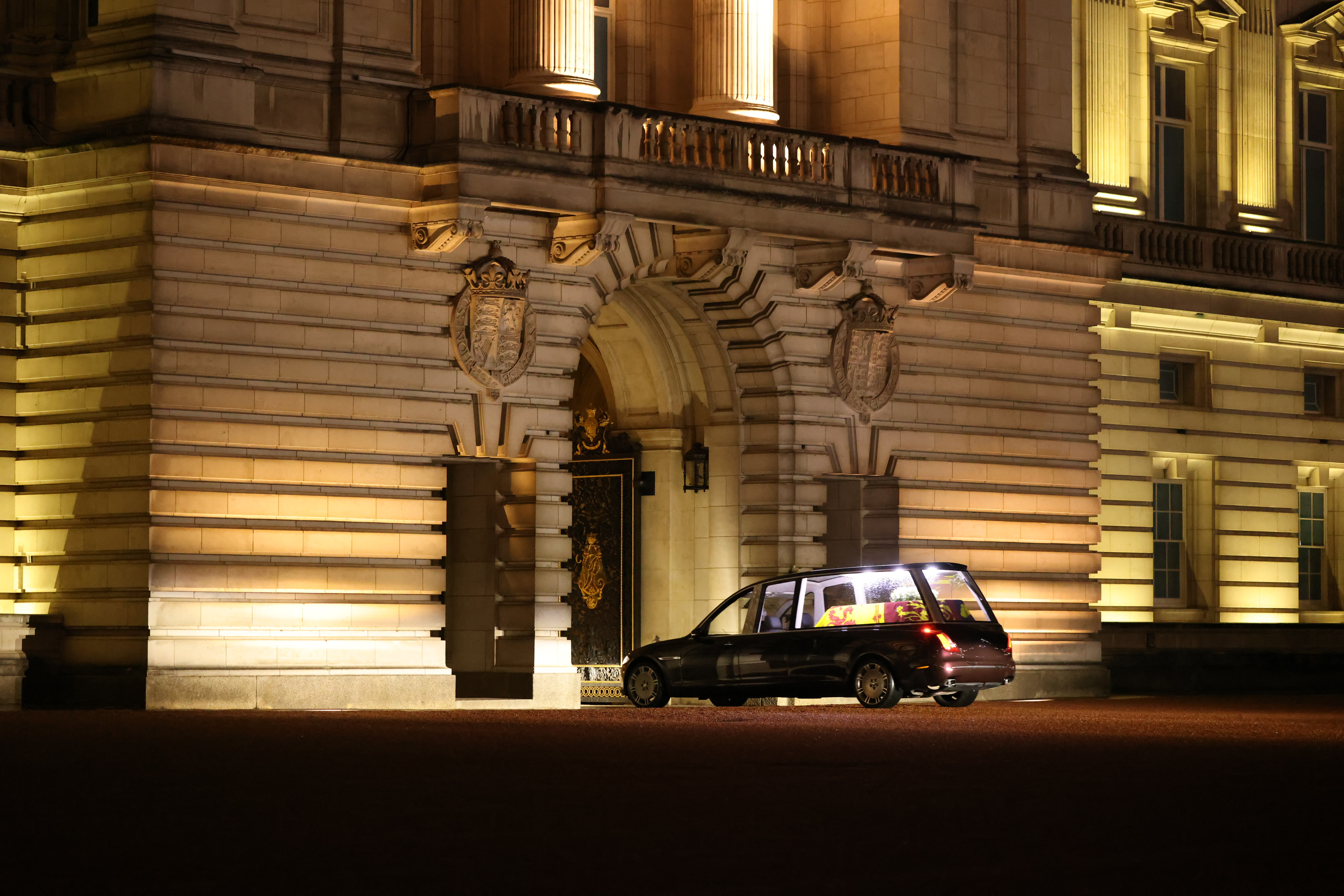
The State Hearse carrying Elizabeth ll's coffin arrives at Buckingham Palace

Upon the arrival of the Queen's coffin in London, it was transported to Buckingham Palace, before being moved to Westminster Hall the following day for her lying-in-state before the state funeral.

When the coffin arrived at RAF Northolt the Queen's Colour Squadron (63 Squadron RAF Regiment) assumed the role of the Bearer Party and formed the Guard of Honour. The coffin was placed in the state hearse and transported through London to Buckingham Palace, with people lining the street to watch; it was then placed in the Bow Room at the Palace in the presence of the royal family. (Note: It was met by all the Queen's children and grandchildren and her nephew and niece, the Earl of Snowdon and Lady Sarah Chatto.)

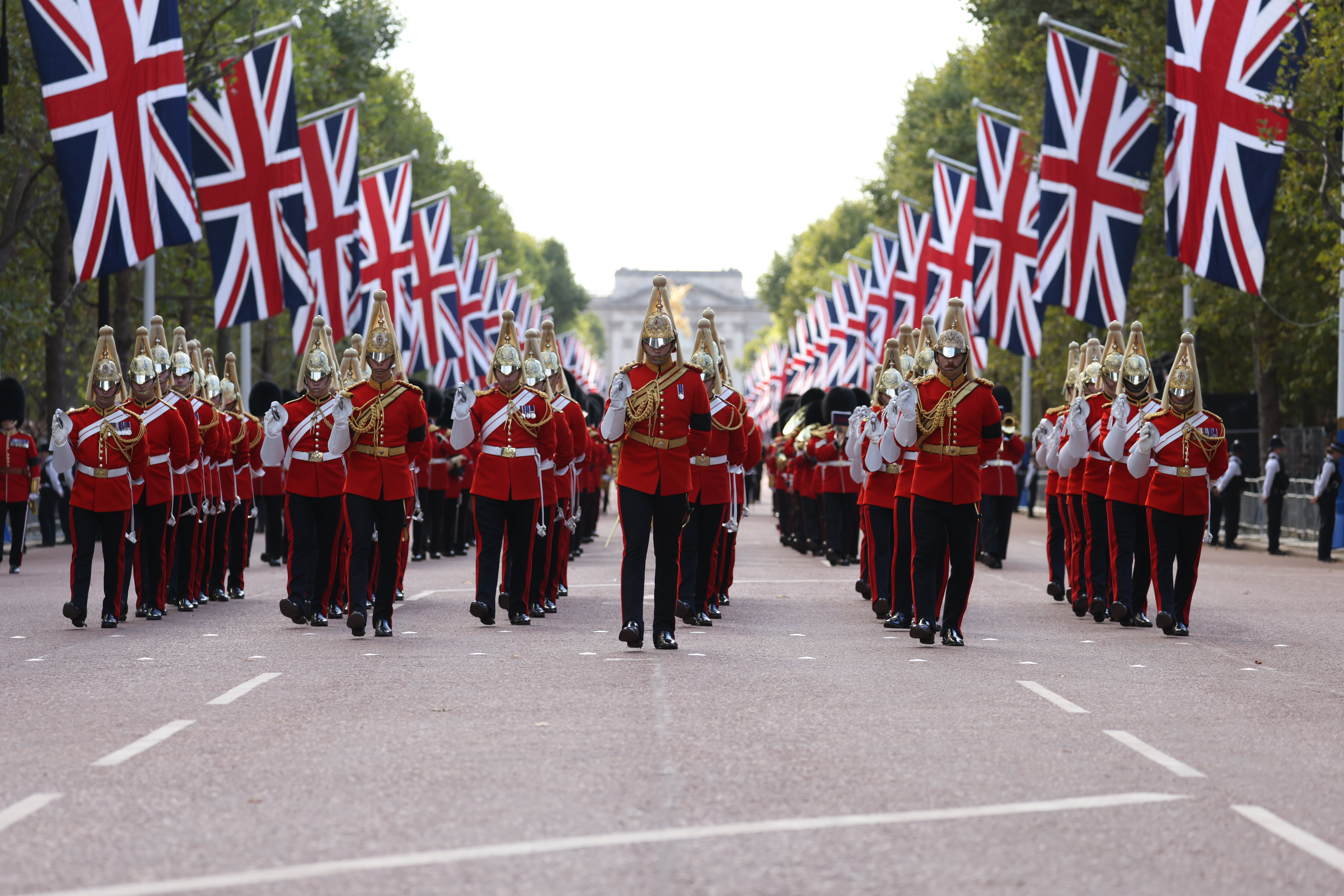
Life Guards with reverse arms leading the coffin in a procession from Buckingham Palace to Westminster Hall for the lying-in-state

The coffin was taken in a military procession from Buckingham Palace to Westminster Hall on a horse-drawn gun carriage of the King's Troop Royal Horse Artillery. (Note: This gun carriage had carried her parents' coffins.) The King, male members of the royal family, and Princess Anne followed the coffin on foot. (Note: The full group included Prince Andrew, Prince Edward, Prince William, Prince Harry, Peter Phillips, the Earl of Snowdon, the Duke of Gloucester, and Timothy Laurence.) This procession, as well as the other processions held later in London and Windsor, marched at the funeral pace of 75 steps per minute and was accompanied by military bands playing marches by Johann Heinrich Walch, Felix Mendelssohn and Frédéric Chopin. Big Ben tolled each minute of the procession and minute guns were fired from Hyde Park by the King's Troop Royal Horse Artillery.

Members of the three armed forces formed a guard of honour to receive the coffin at Parliament Square, after which soldiers from the Queen's Company, 1st Battalion Grenadier Guards, placed the coffin on a catafalque in Westminster Hall. The Archbishop of Canterbury and the Dean of Westminster then conducted a service in the presence of the royal family.

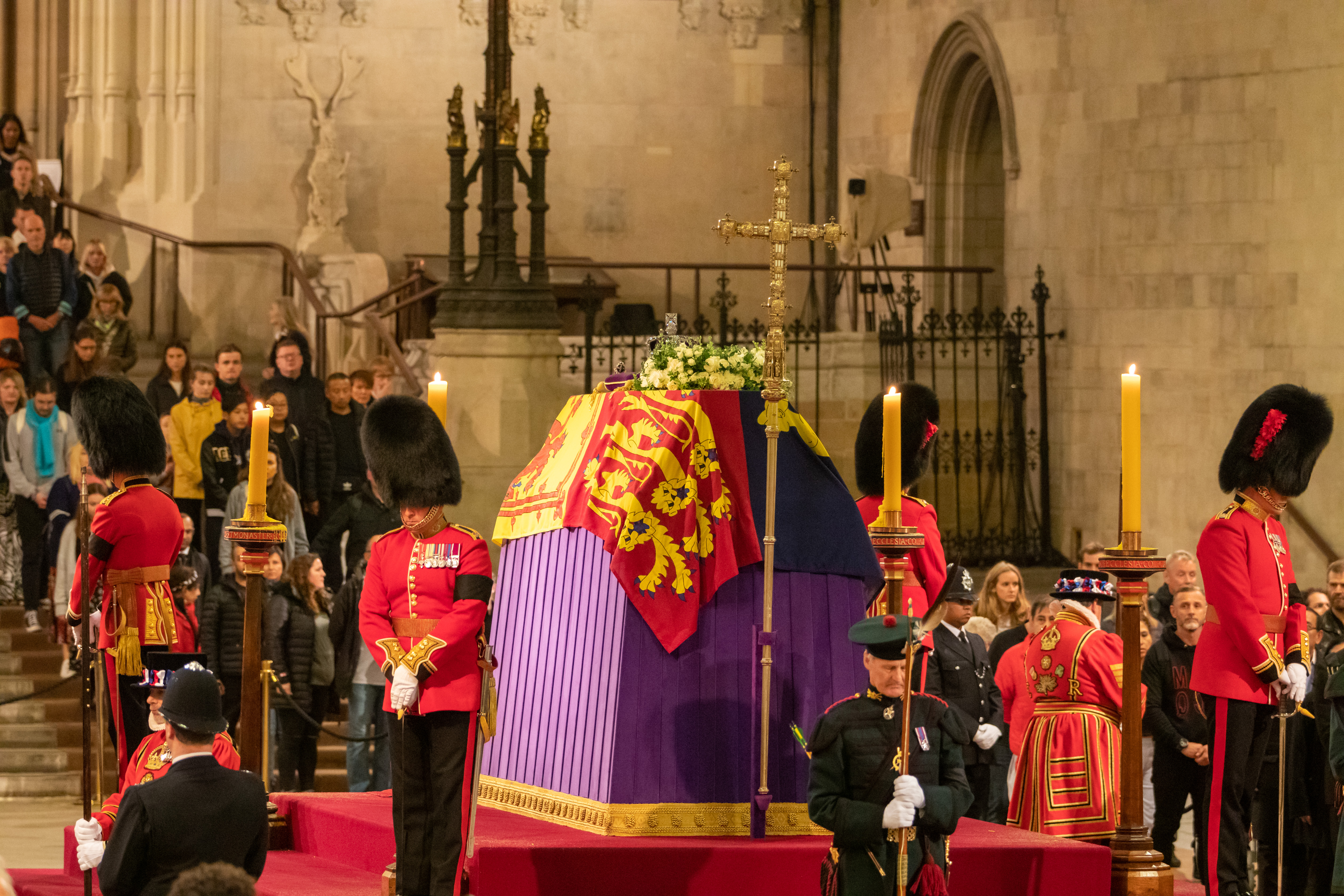
Elizabeth II lying-in-state at Westminster Hall

The Queen lay in state in Westminster Hall from 17:00 on 14 September to 06:30 on 19 September. The coffin was guarded by members of both the Sovereign's Bodyguard (Note: The Sovereign's Bodyguard consists of three units that are classed as personal bodyguards to the Sovereign – the Honourable Corps of Gentlemen at Arms, the King's Bodyguard of the Yeomen of the Guard, and the Royal Company of Archers, The King's Body Guard for Scotland.) and the Household Division. (Note: The Household Division is an overall term used to describe regiments of the British Army that are classed as "guards". There are seven regiments in total – two classed as Household Cavalry (the Life Guards and the Blues and Royals (Royal Horse Guards and 1st Dragoons)), and five as foot guards (Grenadier Guards, Coldstream Guards, Scots Guards, Irish Guards and Welsh Guards).) (Note: An exception took place on 17 September, when the UK's service chiefs – Admiral Sir Tony Radakin (Chief of the Defence Staff), Admiral Sir Ben Key (First Sea Lord and Chief of the Naval Staff), General Sir Patrick Sanders (Chief of the General Staff) and Air Chief Marshal Sir Michael Wigston (Chief of the Air Staff) – stood guard over the catafalque in place of four officers from the foot guards.) The Imperial State Crown and a wreath of flowers and foliage from Balmoral and Windsor castles had been placed on the coffin before the procession, and to these were added the Sovereign's Orb and the Sovereign's Sceptre with Cross; the Wanamaker Cross of Westminster was placed at its head and the regimental flag of The Queen's Company of The Grenadier Guards at its foot. An estimated 250,000 members of the public filed past the coffin, as did politicians and other public figures. Both the BBC and ITV offered a livestream of the Queen lying-in-state. On 16 September, a 28-year-old man was arrested under the Public Order Act after he ran from the queue inside Westminster Hall and touched the coffin.

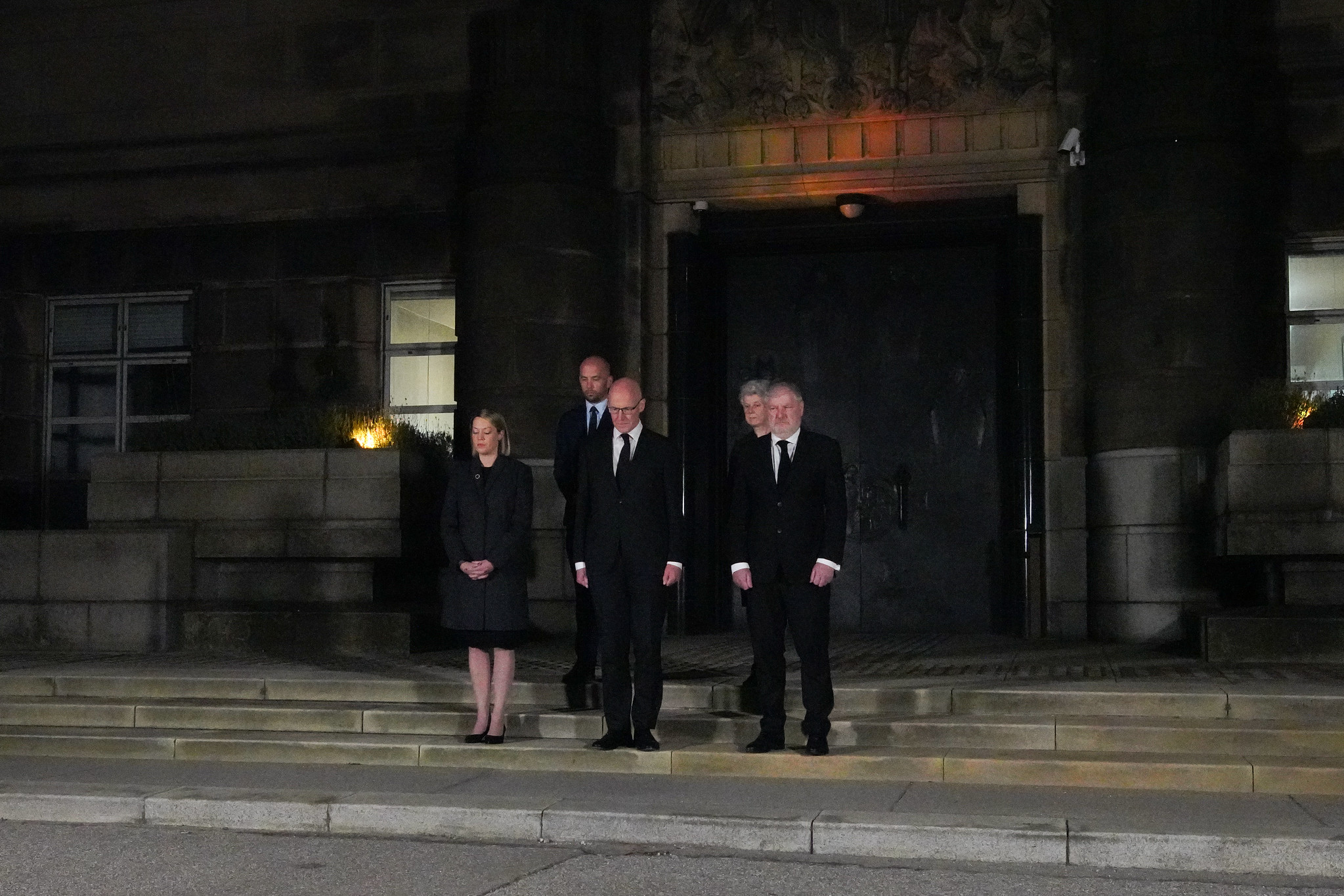
Deputy First Minister John Swinney and Scottish Ministers observe the UK-wide minutes silence on 18 September

In the evening of 16 September the King and his siblings held a vigil around the Queen's coffin for approximately ten minutes, and on 17 September the Queen's eight grandchildren did the same. Prince Andrew and Prince Harry were permitted to wear military uniform on these occasions, who as non-working royals had not done so at previous ceremonial events.

On 18 September, pipers at four different locations in Scotland played "The Immortal Memory" at 18:00. At 20:00 a "Moment of Reflection" marked with a minute's silence was observed across the UK.

==== Queue ====
The route of the queue along the River Thames is shown. The front was in Westminster Hall (left), and at its greatest extent the back was in Southwark Park (right).

Two queues were formed to view the lying-in-state, beginning 48 hours before Westminster Hall opened to the public. At its maximum extent the main queue was approximately 10 miles (16 km) long and had a waiting time of more than 25 hours. This queue attracted much media attention, with many commentators noting the stereotype that British people are good at queueing. The accessible queue, for people with a disability or long-term condition, operated a ticket system and was therefore shorter.

The queue experience was generally perceived to be positive; however there was an allegation of a man committing sexual assault by exposing himself, and some heckling of queuers. The London Ambulance Service also had to assist 710 people, mainly owing to head injuries from fainting.

== State funeral ==
=== Planning ===
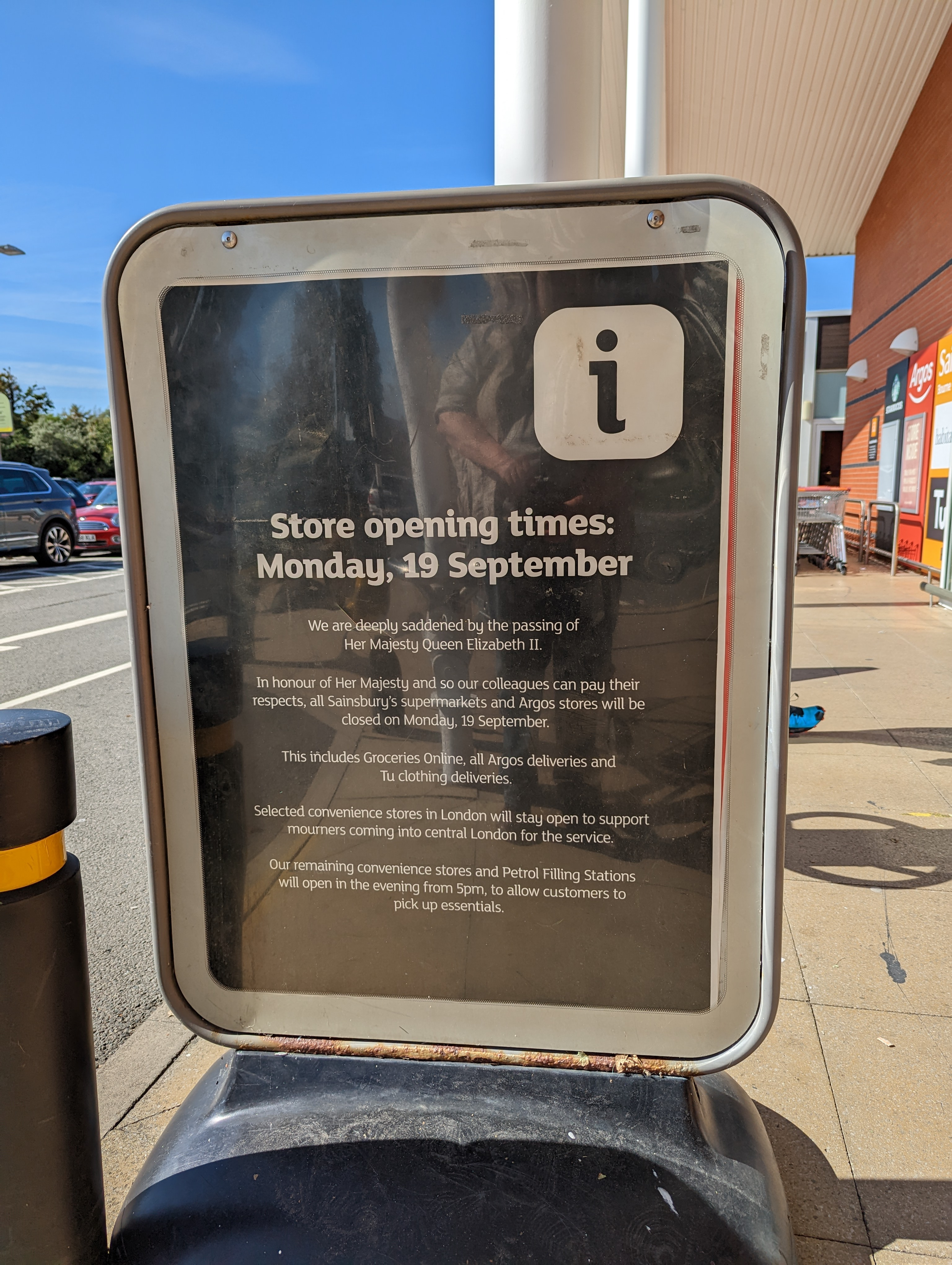
Signage alerting passersby about the closure of Sainsbury's and Argos stores on 19 September

Plans for the Queen's death had existed in some form since the 1960s, and the Queen was consulted about all the details included in her funeral plan. The Earl Marshal was in charge of organising the event.

The planning and complexity of the funeral was compared to that of Winston Churchill in 1965, the last state funeral held in Britain and also a major international event. It marked the first time that a monarch's funeral service had been held at Westminster Abbey since George II in 1760. The Foreign Office handled the invitations, communications, and security arrangements from a headquarters called "The Hangar", redeploying 300 staff to manage the task. Approximately 500 foreign dignitaries and heads of state were expected to attend. Invitations were issued to every country with which Britain maintains diplomatic relations, except for Russia, Belarus, Afghanistan, Myanmar, Venezuela, and Syria. The timing of the funeral allowed guests who planned to address the general debate of the UN General Assembly the following day sufficient time to fly to New York City.

The day of the funeral was a bank holiday in the United Kingdom. Many businesses, workplaces, and educational establishments closed for the day, including major supermarkets and the London Stock Exchange. In the National Health Service several trusts chose to cancel or reschedule all non-urgent appointments. Several food banks announced that they would close on the day of the funeral, though some remained open after facing public backlash. Takeoffs and landings at Heathrow Airport were rescheduled or cancelled to maintain silence during the services in Westminster and Windsor and the processions in between.

Hotel prices increased in the days before the funeral in London. Extra train services were made available across the country to allow people to travel to and from London and pay their respects for the lying-in-state and funeral service. Westminster City Council deployed its "Clean Streets" team to clean up different areas within central London.

=== Procession to Westminster Abbey ===
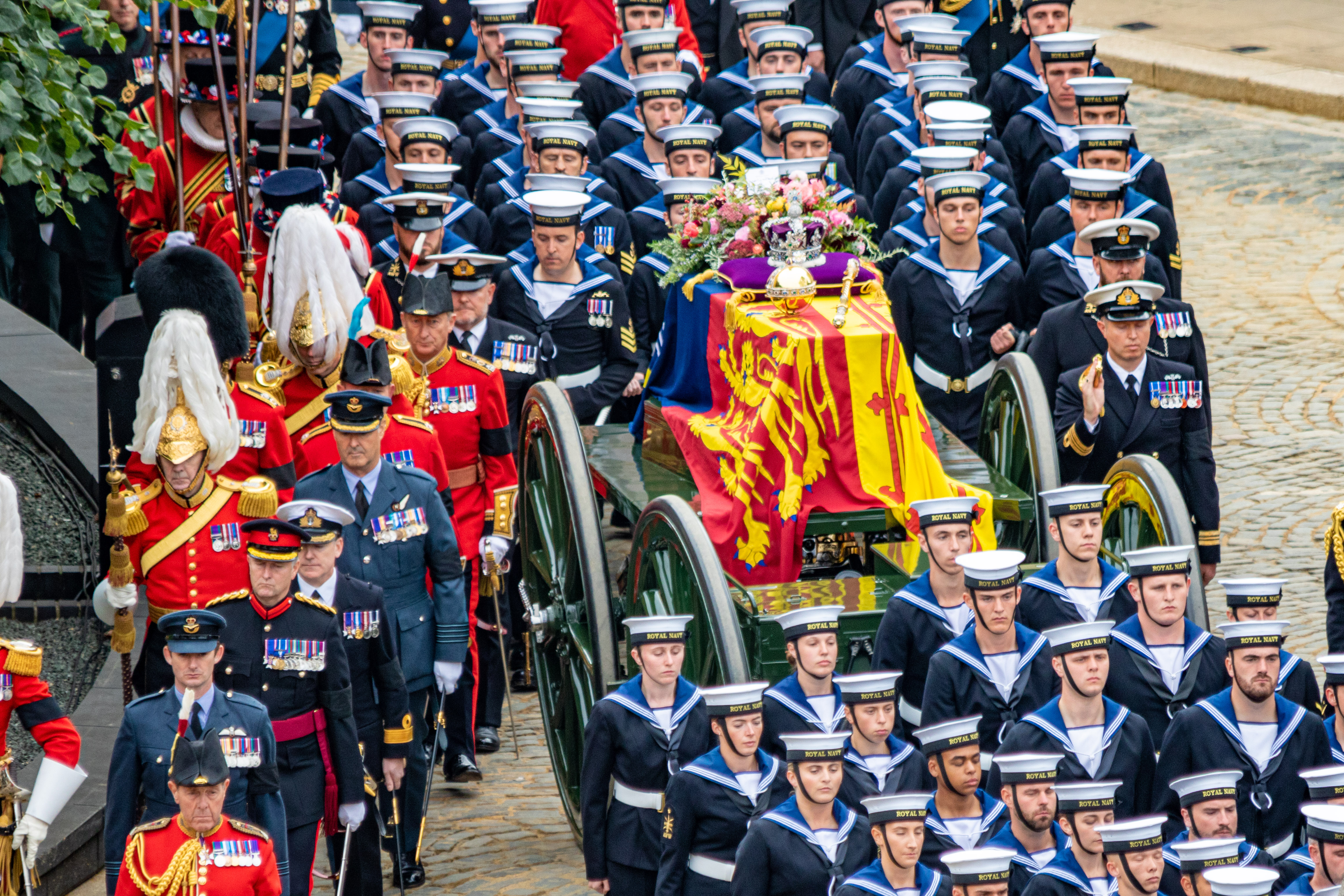
The Queen's coffin on the State Gun Carriage of the Royal Navy during the procession to Westminster Abbey

At 10:44 on 19 September the Queen's coffin was moved from Westminster Hall to Westminster Abbey on the State Gun Carriage of the Royal Navy. The procession was led by two hundred musicians, made up of the pipes and drums of Scottish and Irish regiments, the Brigade of Gurkhas and the Royal Air Force playing "The Mist Covered Mountains of Home". The carriage was drawn by Royal Navy sailors, known as Naval Ratings, maintaining a tradition which began with the state funeral of Queen Victoria. The King, members of the royal family, and members of the King's household walked behind. Non-working royals, including the Duke of York and the Duke of Sussex, did not wear military uniforms for the state funeral and the committal service. A wreath with foliage cut from the gardens of Buckingham Palace, Highgrove House, and Clarence House was placed on the coffin, together with a note from the King which read "In loving and devoted memory. Charles R." (Note: The wreath contained rosemary, English oak and myrtle, and flowers in shades of gold, pink and deep burgundy, with touches of white.) Before the service the tenor bell of the Abbey rang once a minute for 96 minutes, once for each year of the Queen's life. The coffin arrived at Westminster Abbey at 10:52.

=== Funeral service ===
Music by British composers was played before the service, and as the coffin entered the abbey the choir sang William Croft's setting of the Funeral Sentences. (Note: Selections included Orlando Gibbons' "Fantasia of four parts", Vaughan Williams' "Romanza" from his Symphony No. 5, Peter Maxwell Davies' "Reliqui domum meum", Harold Darke's "Meditation on 'Brother James's Air'", Healey Willan's "Prelude on 'Ecce jam noctis'", Herbert Howells' "Psalm Prelude Set 1 No. 2", Charles Villiers Stanford's "In the Country, Op. 194 No. 2", Malcolm Williamson's "Fantasy on 'O Paradise'", and three works by Elgar: "Elegy, Op. 58", "Andante espressivo" from "Sonata in G Op. 28", and "Sospiri".) The service began at 11:00 and was conducted by the Dean of Westminster, David Hoyle, according to the 1662 Book of Common Prayer. The lessons were read by Baroness Scotland of Asthal, Secretary General of the Commonwealth, and Liz Truss, Prime Minister of the United Kingdom, and the sermon and commendation were given by the Archbishop of Canterbury, Justin Welby. Prayers, led by precentor Mark Birch, were said by ministers and clergy from several Christian denominations. (Note: The prayers were said by Iain Greenshields (Moderator of the General Assembly of the Church of Scotland), Shermara Fletcher (Principal Officer for Pentecostal and Charismatic Relations, Churches Together in England), Sarah Mullally (Bishop of London and Dean of His Majesty's Chapels Royal), Helen Cameron (Moderator of the Free Churches Group), Vincent Nichols (Archbishop of Westminster), and Stephen Cottrell (Archbishop of York).)

The music included the psalm setting "Like as the hart" by Judith Weir and the anthem "Who shall separate us?" by James MacMillan, both written for the funeral, as well as pieces performed at the Queen's coronation and wedding. (Note: Besides those mentioned, the works sung at the service were "The day thou gavest, Lord, is ended" (St Clement), "The Lord's My Shepherd" (Crimond), "My soul, there is a country" by Hubert Parry, "Taste and see how gracious the Lord is" by Ralph Vaughan Williams, and "Love Divine, All Loves Excelling" (Blaenwern).) The Choir of Westminster Abbey and Choir of the Chapel Royal led the singing, and were conducted by James O'Donnell. The organ was played during the service by Peter Holder and before the service by Matthew Jorysz.

The end of the service included a sounding of the "Last Post" and a two-minute silence, which was concluded with the "Reveille". "God Save the King" was sung. The Queen's personal piper, Pipe Major Paul Burns, who woke her each morning by playing the bagpipes outside her window, played the Gaelic bagpipe lament "Sleep, Dearie, Sleep", following the old tradition of walking away as a symbol of "escorting the soul to heaven", which marked the end of the ceremony. The Queen's coffin was carried out of the church to the music of Bach's Fantasia in C minor. When the guard entered the crossing, the mood of the music changed from C minor to E flat major until the coffin was pulled from the catafalque. When the guard turned the coffin, the mood also changed back to minor. The "Allegro maestoso" from Elgar's Organ Sonata in G was played after the service. The Queen's body was taken to Windsor Castle, where it was interred in St George's Chapel. Pipe Major Paul Burns played the lament, 'A Salute to the Royal Fendersmith', the lament he woke her each morning with, one last time, as her coffin was lowered into the Royal crypt.

=== Processions in London and Windsor ===
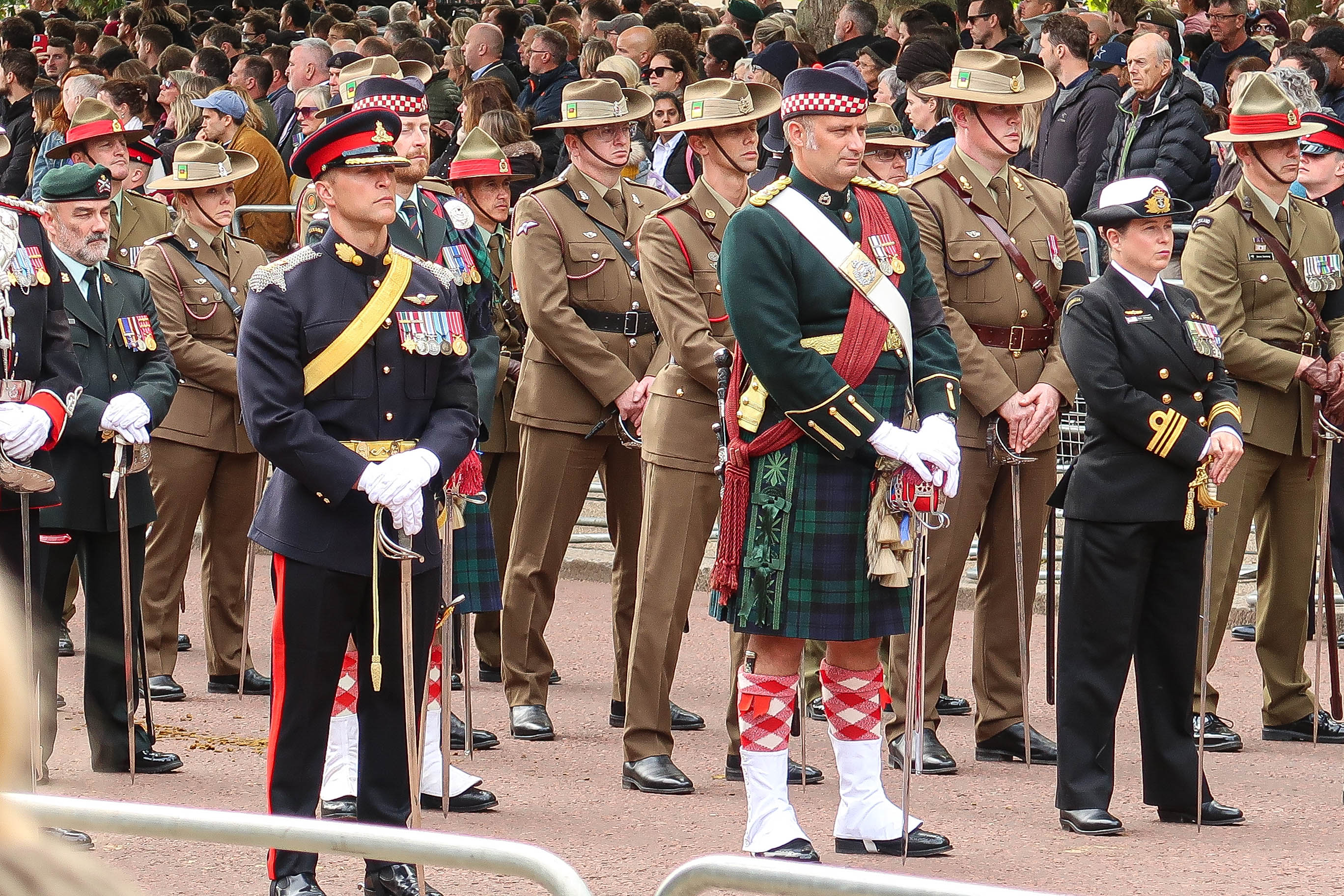
Representatives from Canada, Australia, and New Zealand during the procession to Wellington Arch

Two processions followed the service. The first was from Westminster Abbey to Wellington Arch, where the Queen's coffin was placed in the state hearse. From there it was transported to Windsor, where the second procession took place through Windsor Great Park.

The procession in London began at 12:15 and included around 3,000 military personnel, stretching for more than a mile. It began at the abbey and passed down Whitehall, through Horse Guards, up The Mall, past Buckingham Palace, and up Constitution Hill to end at the Wellington Arch at Hyde Park Corner. Around a million people lined the streets of central London to watch the event.

At the front of the procession were representatives of Commonwealth forces led by members of the Royal Canadian Mounted Police on horseback, then representatives of the Royal Air Force, the British Army, and the Royal Navy and Royal Marines, followed by defence staff and armed forces chaplains, officers of arms, and the royal household. The Queen's coffin followed, again on the State Gun Carriage pulled by Royal Navy sailors, and surrounded by an escort party. The King and royal family members were next, some marching and some in cars, with a further escort and the household of the former Prince of Wales behind. At the rear of the procession were representatives of civilian services.

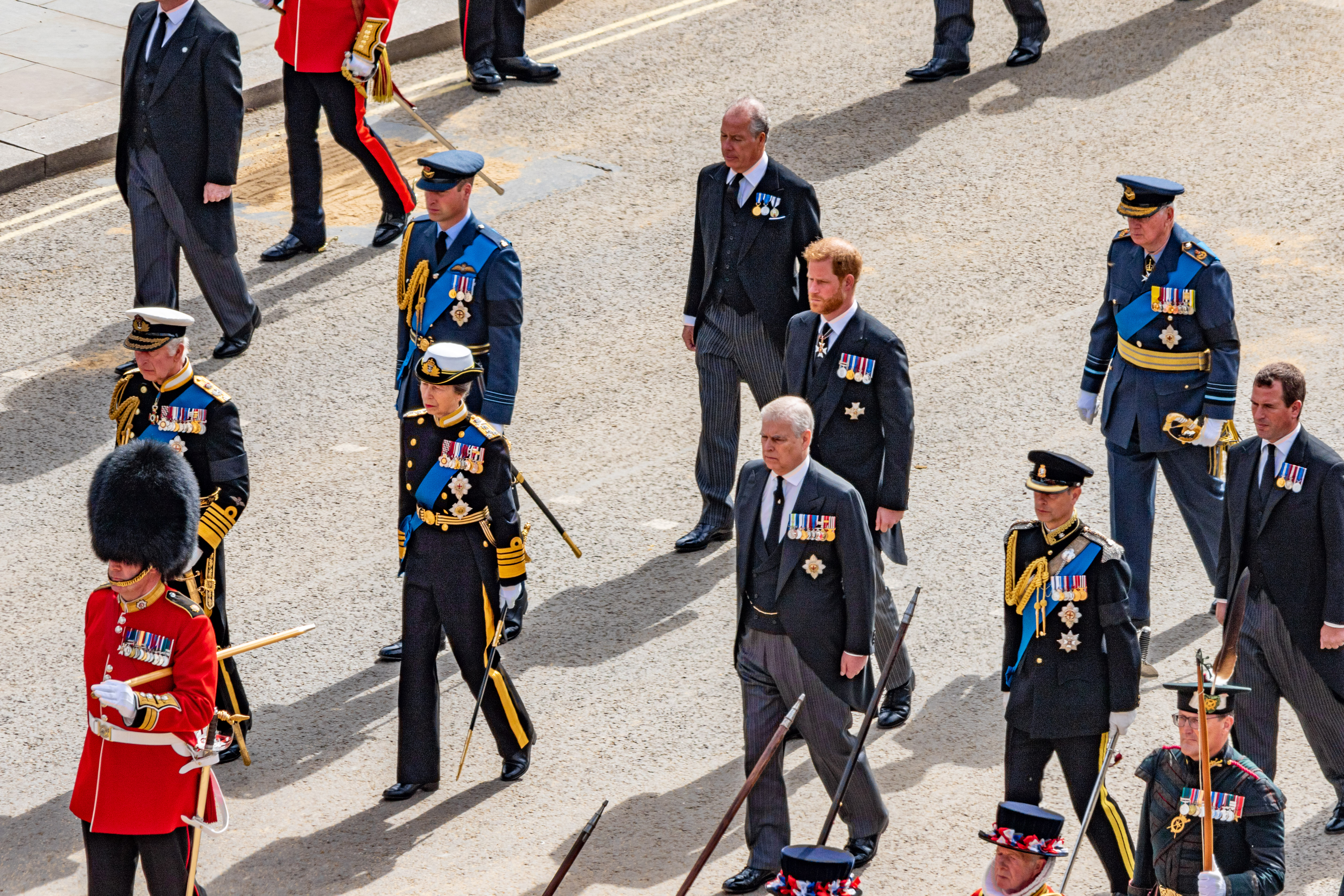
The King, the Princess Royal, the Duke of York, the Earl of Wessex, the Prince of Wales, the Duke of Sussex, Peter Phillips, the Earl of Snowdon and the Duke of Gloucester walk behind Queen Elizabeth II's coffin. Sir Timothy Laurence was also in the procession but is not seen in the photo.

Seven military bands were dispersed through the procession and again played funeral marches. Big Ben tolled each minute and minute guns were fired from Hyde Park by the King's Troop Royal Horse Artillery. Standards were lowered and those in the procession gave salutes as they passed the Cenotaph. At Buckingham Palace, the King's Guard gave a royal salute to the Victoria Memorial and Palace staff waited outside the gates. At Wellington Arch the coffin was transferred with a royal salute to the state hearse for the journey to Windsor. The hearse left London for Windsor at 13:30, accompanied by Princess Anne and Timothy Laurence, avoiding motorways to allow the public to line the route.

At 15:00, the hearse with the Queen's coffin arrived in Windsor, where a final procession involving 1,000 military personnel took place. The procession began from the Shaw Farm Gate on Albert Road before turning onto the Long Walk towards Windsor Castle. Around 97,000 people lined the route. The Queen's Fell pony, Emma, and two royal corgis, Muick and Sandy, stood at the side of the procession. The King and the royal family joined the procession in the Quadrangle, during which the Sebastopol Bell and the Curfew Tower bell tolled and the King's Troop, Royal Horse Artillery, fired minute guns from the East Lawn of the castle. At the end of the procession the coffin was taken to St George's Chapel via the West Steps with the guard of honour formed by the 1st Battalion Grenadier Guards.

=== Committal service ===
The committal service began at 16:00 in the presence of 800 guests, largely made up of the royal household and staff from the Queen's private estates, but also including the royal family, governors general and prime ministers from the Commonwealth realms, and members of foreign royal houses. The Choir of St George's Chapel led the music, which included the Russian "Kontakion of the Departed", also sung at the funeral of Prince Philip. (Note: The other music was Psalm 121 to an arrangement by Sir Henry Walford Davies, sung as the Queen's coffin made its way through the chapel, the motet "Bring us, O Lord God, at our last awakening", "All My Hope on God is Founded", "Christ Is Made the Sure Foundation", and Bach's "Prelude and Fugue in C minor, BWV 546", played after the service.) A selection of music was also played before the service. (Note: Music before the service included "Schmücke dich, o liebe Seele BWV 654", "O Traurigkeit, O Herzeleid", "Master Tallis's Testament", "Psalm Prelude Set 1, No. 1", "Psalm Prelude Set 1, No. 2", "Melody (Three Pieces)", "Andante Sostenuto (Symphonie Gothique, Op. 70)", "The Tree of Peace", "'Nimrod' (Variations On An Original Theme, Op.36)", "Prelude" by Sir William Henry Harris, "Sheep May Safely Graze, BWV 208", and "Rhosymedre".)

David Conner, Dean of Windsor, who conducted the service, read the bidding, the readings, and the commendation. The first reading was Revelation 21, verses 1–7, which was also included in the order of service for the funerals of Elizabeth's grandparents and father. The Rector of Sandringham, the Minister of Crathie Kirk and the Chaplain of Windsor Great Park delivered the prayers, and the Archbishop of Canterbury gave the concluding blessing.

Near the end of the service the Imperial State Crown, orb, and sceptre were removed from the coffin and placed on the altar. The King then placed the Queen's Company Camp Colour of the Grenadier Guards on his mother's coffin, before the Lord Chamberlain symbolically broke his wand of office, actually by separating the magnetic tips in the middle, and placing both halves on the coffin. After this the Garter Principal King of Arms recited the styles of Elizabeth II and Charles III, between which a lament – "A Salute to the Royal Fendersmith" – was played by the Sovereign's Piper as the Queen's coffin was lowered into the Royal Vault (not televised). The singing of the National Anthem marked the end of the ceremony.

=== Interment ===
After the funeral of the Queen on 19 September, she was later interred beneath the King George VI Memorial Chapel in a private service attended only by her closest family at 19:30, alongside her father King George VI, her mother Queen Elizabeth the Queen Mother, and the ashes of her sister Princess Margaret. The remains of Prince Philip, who was temporarily interred in the Royal Vault following his funeral in 2021, were moved to the chapel after the interment of the Queen.

Elizabeth II's coffin was constructed more than 30 years before the funeral. (Note: The original coffin makers are now closed. It passed through the hands of two funeral directors before Leverton & Sons received it when they became undertakers to the Royal Family in 1991. The original coffin firm, Henry Smith, had also manufactured the coffin in which Prince Philip lies.) It is made of English oak and lined with lead to protect the coffin and the remains from moisture damage. Owing to the weight of the coffin, eight pallbearers were required for lifting and carrying rather than the usual six. The pallbearers were members of the 1st Battalion Grenadier Guards.

== Organisation and media ==
=== Attendees ===
Map showing countries from which at least one representative attended the funeral

The service at Westminster Abbey was attended by 2,000 people in total, including holders of the Victoria Cross and George Cross, representatives from the United Kingdom's faith communities, and foreign and Commonwealth heads of state and heads of government. Representatives from 168 countries, out of 193 UN member states and two UN observer states, confirmed attendance, including 18 monarchs, 55 presidents and 25 prime ministers.

Owing to the limited number of seats, foreign invitees were asked to keep their delegations as small as possible and to bring only their spouses. The UK government also requested those travelling by air to use commercial flights; private flights were directed away from Heathrow Airport. Additionally, the government asked guests not to use private cars to travel to Westminster Abbey, and instead use government-provided "coach transport from a central assembly point". This was only guidance; leaders including the President of the United States, Joe Biden, the President of Israel, Isaac Herzog, and the vice-president of China, Wang Qishan, were taken to the event through other means. Many dignitaries were present for a reception by the King at Buckingham Palace on the eve of the funeral, and all international guests were invited to attend a reception hosted by the Foreign Secretary, James Cleverly, after the funeral service.

Almost 200 people, recognised in the 2022 Queen's Birthday Honours for their extraordinary contributions in areas including the response to the COVID-19 pandemic, were invited to the service.

=== Security ===
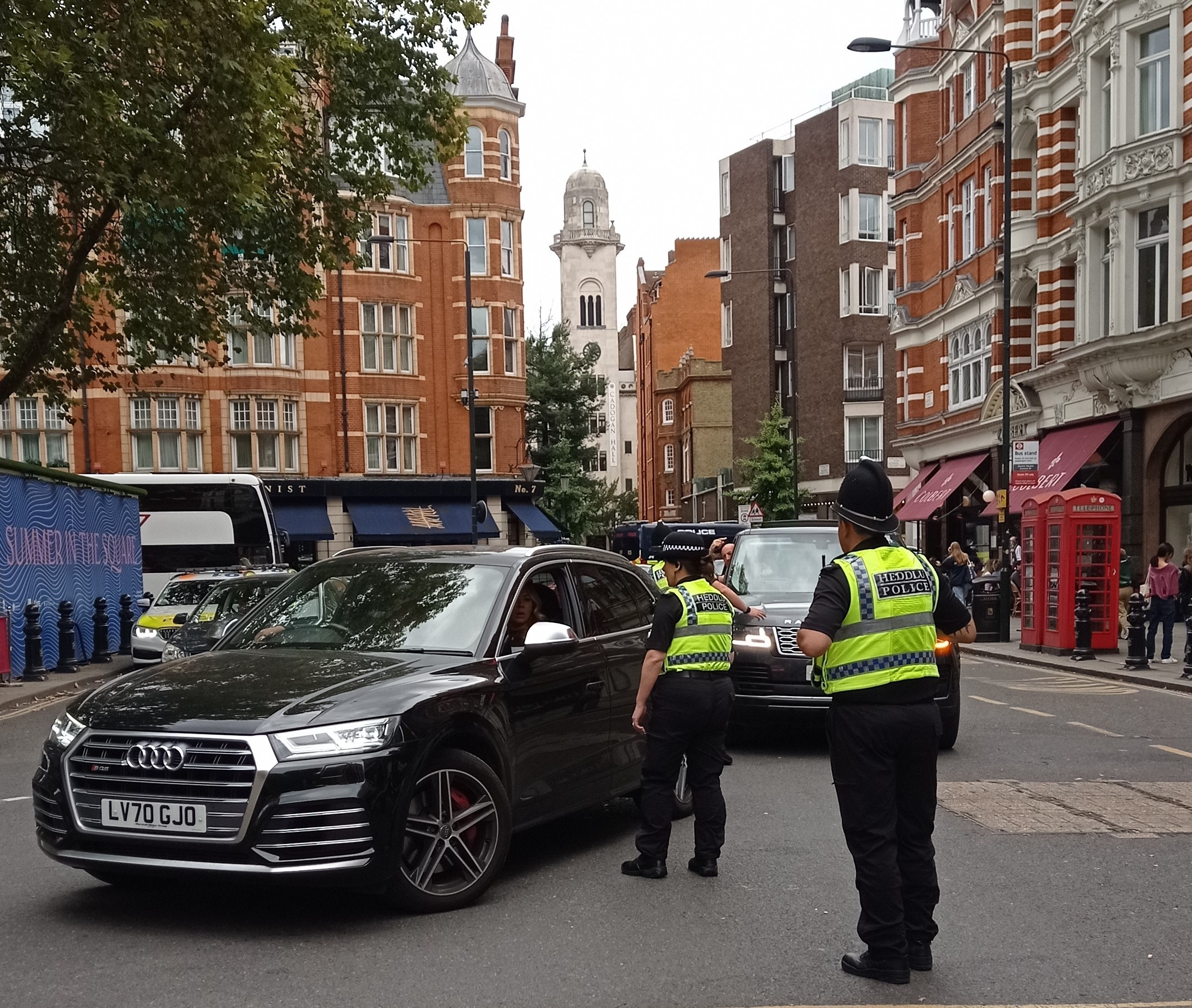
Police officers from Wales on duty in Sloane Square, London, before the funeral

Around 10,000 police officers were expected to be on duty every day in London during the mourning period, a security operation described by the Metropolitan Police as the "biggest the UK has ever seen"; officers from across the country supported the operation under mutual aid agreements. Thames Valley Police announced that they would introduce new water patrols for observing busy waterways in the lead-up to the funeral, and mounted police officers, police dogs, and drones provided part of the security in Windsor. Prior to the service a special unit, the Fixated Threat Assessment Centre, began to monitor and review individuals identified as having a potentially dangerous obsession with the British royal family.

MI5 and GCHQ worked in collaboration with counter-terrorism police and the Metropolitan Police to provide security for the funeral. A group of 1,500 military personnel was also deployed, and Westminster was inspected by a military Wildcat helicopter. "Hundreds" of stewards from private security firms were hired to aid with crowd management.

=== Cost and economic impact ===
HM Treasury estimated the public expenditure to have been £162 million. The GDP of the United Kingdom contracted by 0.6 per cent in September 2022, attributable in part to the funeral and the period of national mourning that preceded it.

=== Coverage ===
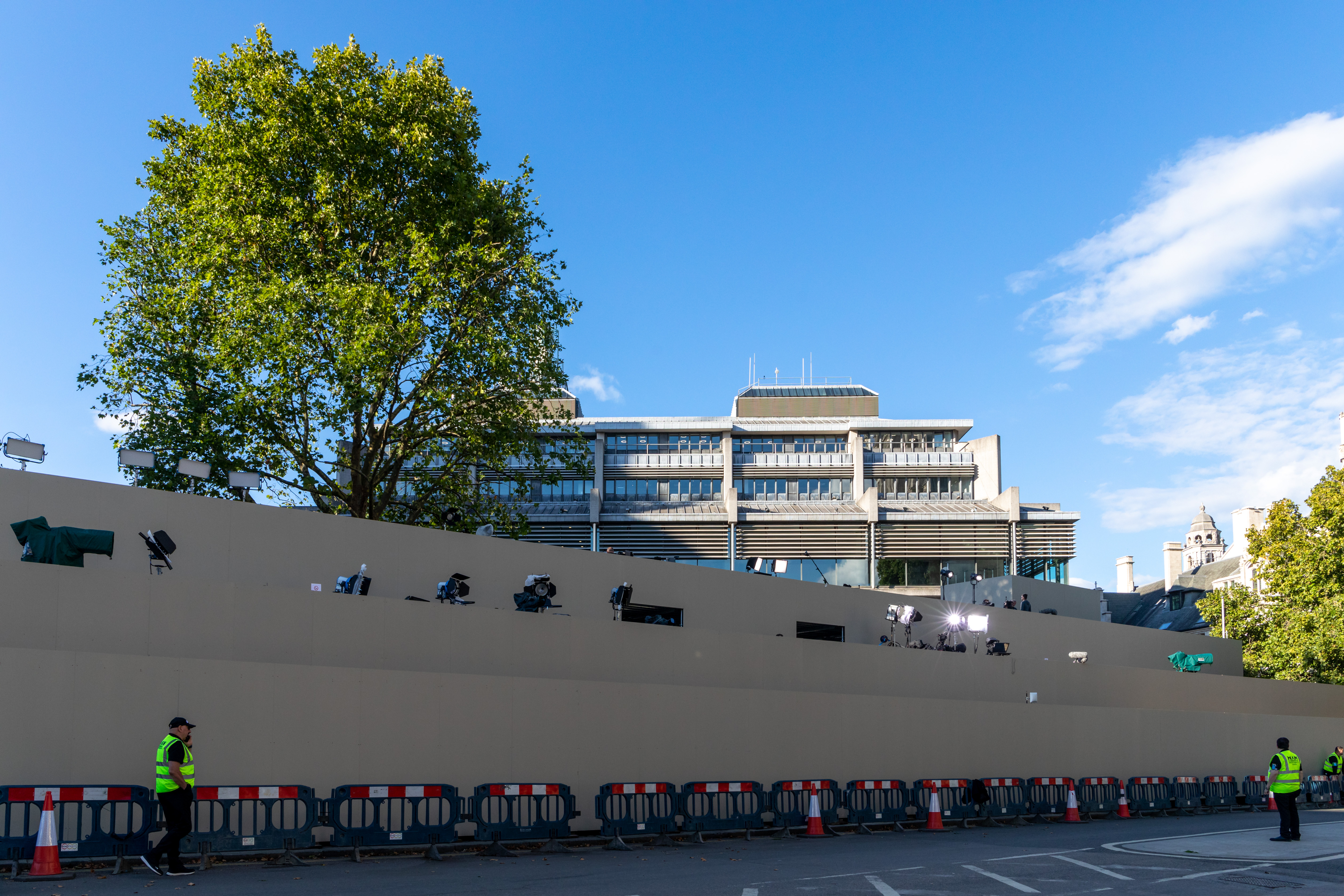
Temporary stands set up for broadcasters across the road from Westminster Abbey

The BBC was the host broadcaster for the funeral, with coverage produced by BBC Studios Events. "Well rehearsed" plans to cover the funeral were put in place, with 14 outside broadcast trucks and over 200 cameras used across 10 locations. Media noted that "senior TV executives had been preparing funeral coverage" for nearly 40 years.

The funeral and committal service of the Queen were the first of any British monarch to be broadcast on television to the public. Filming had been prohibited during the state funeral of George VI, although the procession of his coffin was partially televised, and the service itself had been broadcast on radio.

Buckingham Palace requested that video footage did not "intrude on the grief" of individual members of the royal family, that footage of the funeral be avoided from usage on entertainment programmes and allowed for only news coverage, and that five short pieces of video featuring members of the royal family would not be broadcast again.

==== United Kingdom ====
The funeral was broadcast by the BBC, ITV, S4C, and Sky. ITV simulcast its coverage across its channels, while Sky simulcast Sky News coverage across a number of its satellite channels; all other Sky channels were suspended. The BBC Two broadcast included British Sign Language interpretation. BBC Radio broadcast events on Radio 2, 3, 4, 5 Live, the World Service, and its Local Radio network. BBC Cymru Wales produced coverage for S4C under its Newyddion programme. Global's radio brands also broadcast their own coverage.

Channel 4 and Channel 5 were the only major public service networks that did not air the funeral; Channel 4 scheduled a mix of factual programmes and classic films (including A Queen Is Crowned, the 1953 documentary film of Elizabeth II's coronation), and Channel 5 scheduled a lineup of family films. Advertising was suspended across many commercial-supported broadcasters.

Big screens were set up at cathedrals and public areas to broadcast the service. Shops, licensed establishments, parish and public halls remained open in Jersey to allow people to watch the Queen's funeral.

==== Other countries ====
The funeral was carried live by national broadcasters within the Commonwealth, in most of Europe and across the world.

==== Viewing figures ====
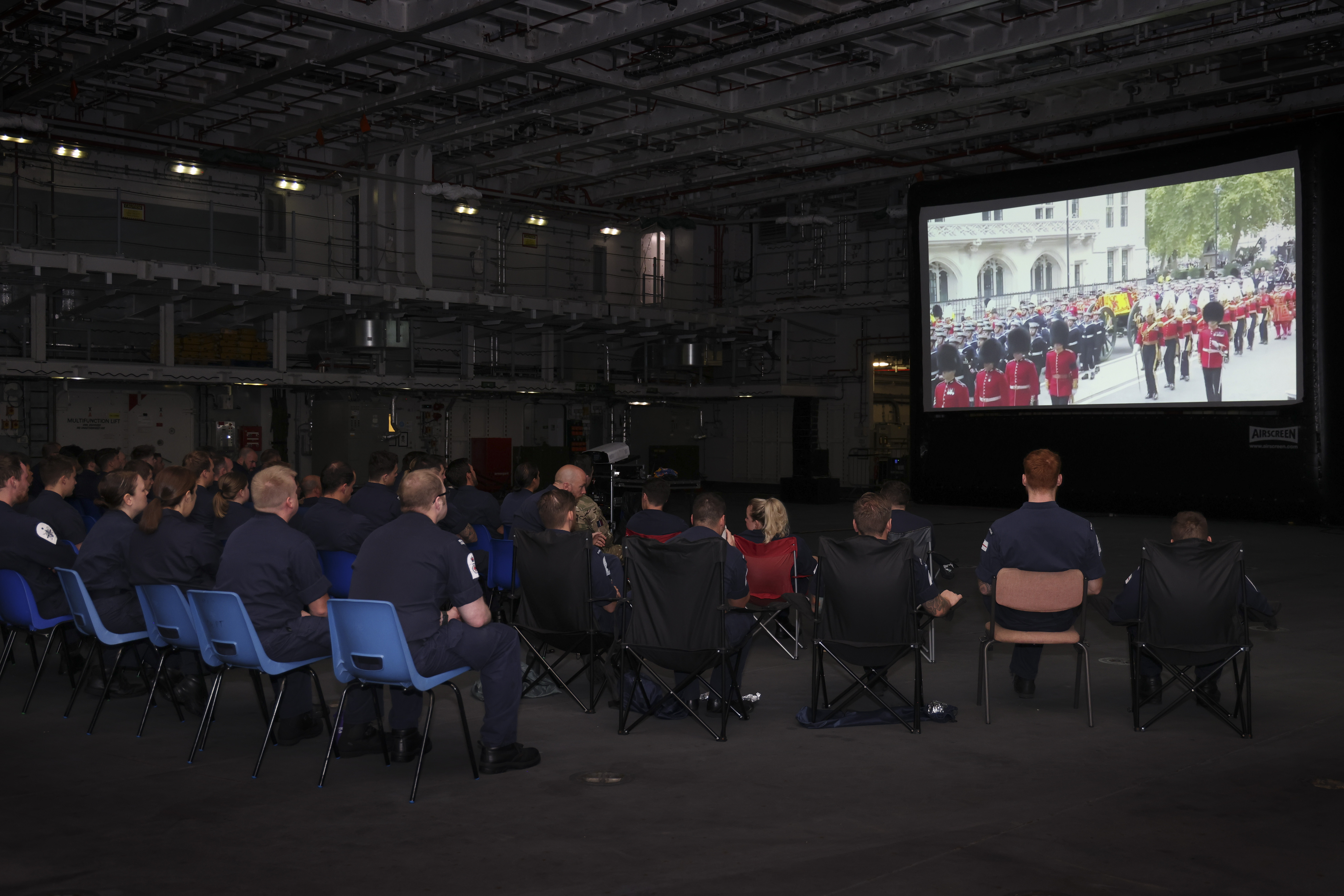
Sailors on board HMS Queen Elizabeth watching the funeral

With an average audience of 26.5 million across more than 50 channels, the television broadcast was the second most watched broadcast in the United Kingdom during the 21st century (after Prime Minister Boris Johnson's statement announcing a COVID-19 lockdown in March 2020) and the third most watched royal event in British history (surpassing the wedding of Prince William and Catherine Middleton, and approaching the weddings of Prince Charles and Lady Diana Spencer, and Princess Anne and Mark Philips).

Coverage in the United States was watched by more than 10 million viewers, with ABC News averaging three million viewers during its coverage of the event. An audience of 7.5 million in France viewed coverage across six mainstream channels.

== Succession and four-nation tour ==
=== Accession ===
Upon the Queen's death, her eldest son, Charles, Prince of Wales, immediately acceded to the British throne as King Charles III.

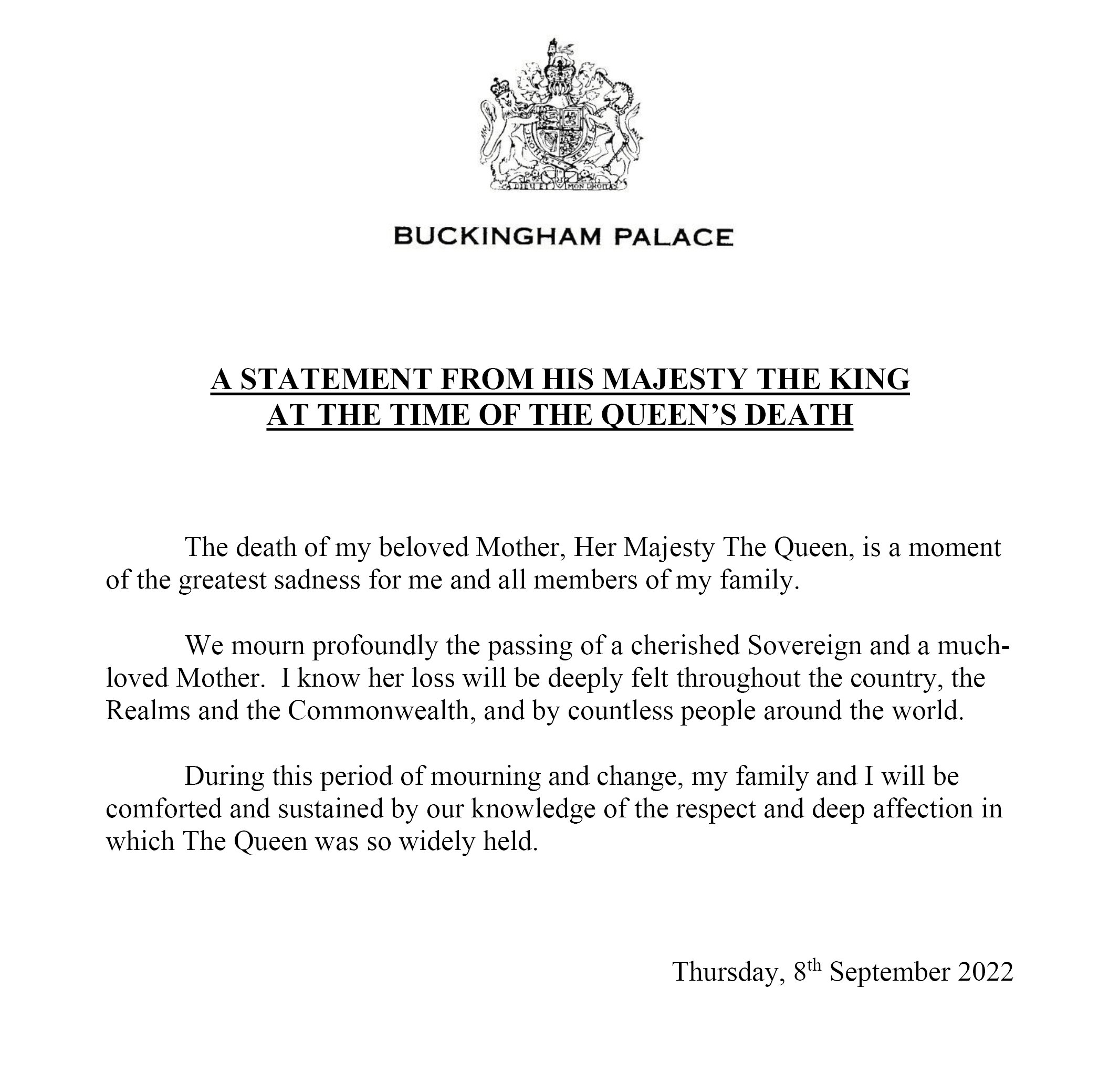
Charles's first statement as king following the death of his mother

There was some speculation regarding the regnal name that would be adopted by the former Prince of Wales upon succeeding his mother. During her formal televised address outside 10 Downing Street, Prime Minister Liz Truss made the first mention of the King's regnal name during a tribute to the Queen. Clarence House officially confirmed the new king would be known as Charles III shortly after the Prime Minister's address. Buckingham Palace released the King's first official statement as monarch at 19:04, in which he said that the Queen's "loss will be deeply felt throughout the country, the Realms and the Commonwealth, and by countless people around the world".

Most of Charles III's pre-accession Scottish titles, as well as the title Duke of Cornwall, were passed to his elder son and the new heir apparent to the throne, Prince William, Duke of Cambridge. On 9 September, William was named Prince of Wales and Earl of Chester, succeeding his father.

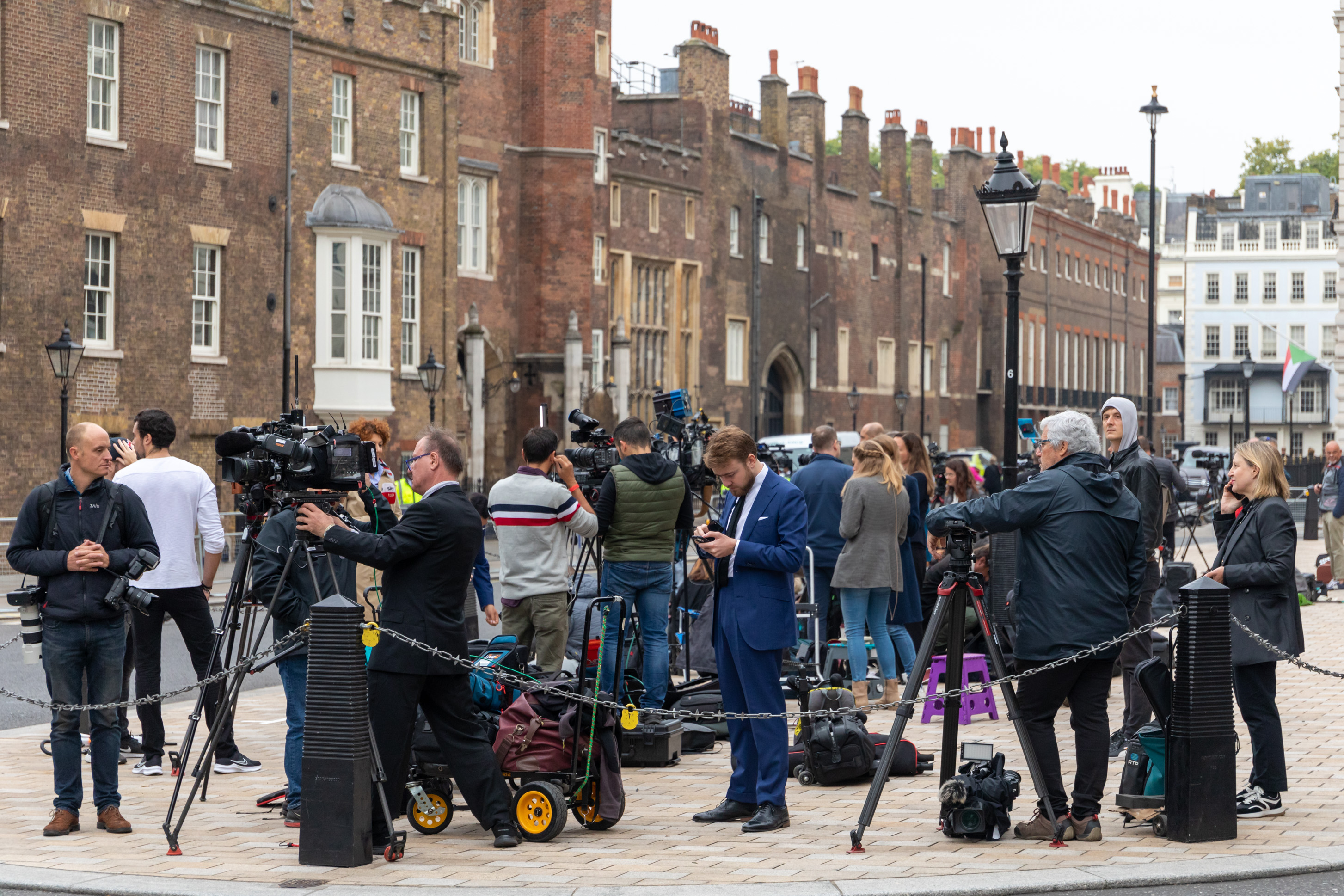
The press covering the Accession Council outside St James's Palace

The Accession Council assembled on 10 September at St James's Palace formally to proclaim the accession of Charles III. Although about seven hundred people were eligible to attend the ceremony, because the event was planned at short notice, the number in attendance was two hundred. In addition to other formalities, the Council confirmed "Charles III" as the King's regnal name. At 11:00, 21-gun salutes at the Tower of London, Cardiff Castle, Edinburgh Castle, Castle Cornet, Gibraltar, and naval bases and ships at sea marked the accession of Charles III. The King greeted crowds outside Buckingham Palace after the ceremony.

On 10 September, senior MPs swore an oath of allegiance to Charles III in a special session of Parliament. The King then met the Prime Minister for a second time and held audiences with members of her cabinet and leaders of the opposition parties.

The coronation of Charles III and Camilla took place on 6 May 2023 at Westminster Abbey.

=== Four-nation royal tour ===
King Charles III and Queen Camilla travelled from Balmoral to Buckingham Palace, where they greeted the crowd of mourners outside the gates. The King then held an audience with the Prime Minister before paying tribute to his mother in a publicly broadcast message. Further, it was announced by the Palace that a national period of mourning would be observed until the day after the state funeral (19 September), and an additional seven days would be observed by the royal family, royal household, and troops on ceremonial duties.

On 11 September, the King met the Commonwealth Secretary General at Buckingham Palace, after which he hosted the High Commissioners of Commonwealth realms.

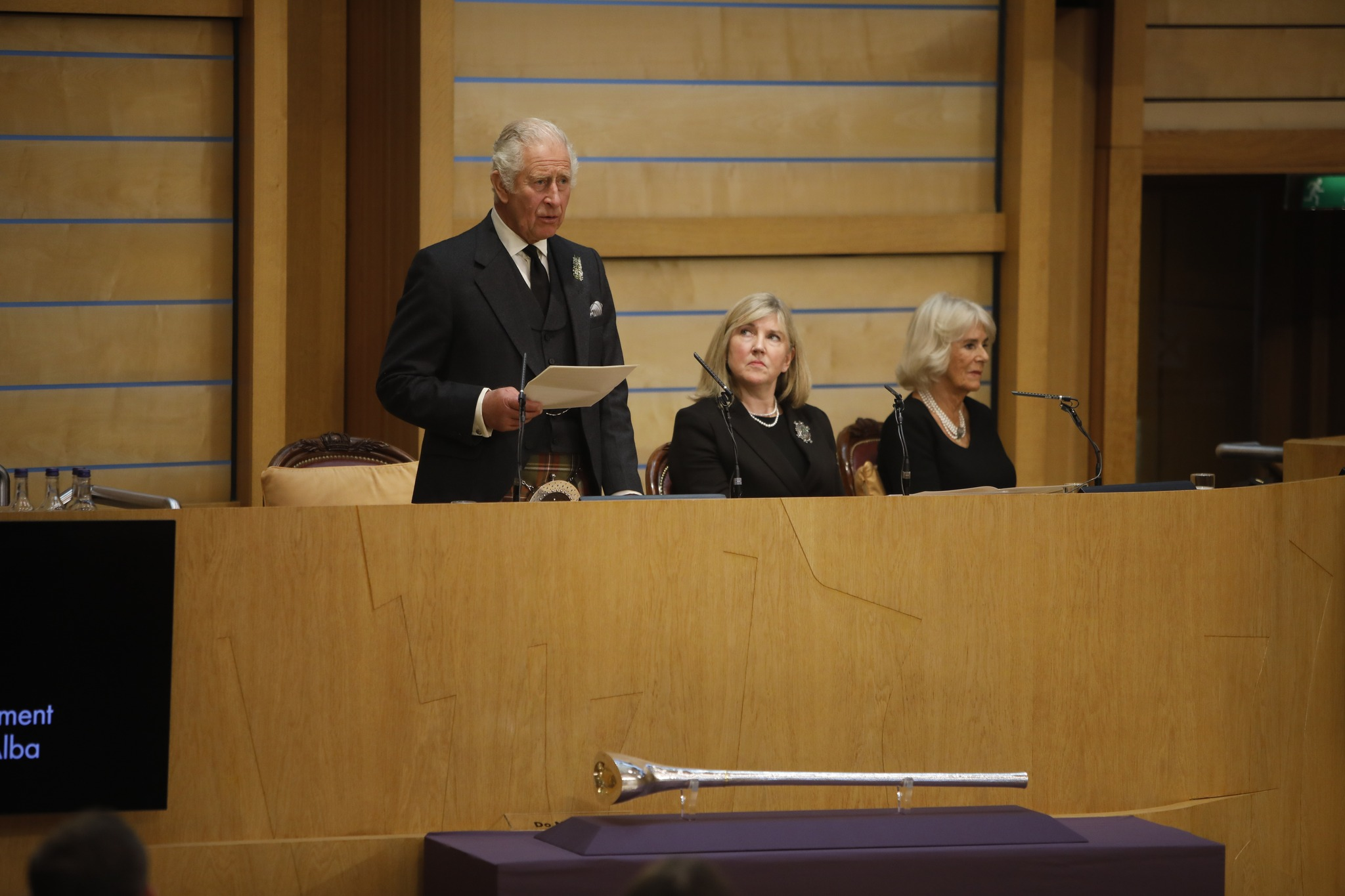
King Charles III addressing the Scottish Parliament following his accession

On 12 September, the King travelled to Westminster Hall with the Queen Consort (Note: Before her coronation on 6 May 2023, Queen Camilla was initially styled as "Her Majesty The Queen Consort" to distinguish her from the recently deceased Queen Elizabeth II.) to receive condolences from the House of Commons and the House of Lords and to give a speech to both houses. He and the Queen Consort then travelled to the Palace of Holyroodhouse in Edinburgh, where they greeted members of the public and viewed floral tributes before the King inspected the Guard of Honour from the Royal Regiment of Scotland. The Ceremony of the Keys followed. The King then had an audience at Holyroodhouse with the first minister of Scotland, Nicola Sturgeon, and the presiding officer of the Scottish Parliament, Alison Johnstone. The King and the Queen Consort visited the Scottish Parliament to receive a motion of condolence and observed a two-minute silence with MSPs.

On 13 September, the King and the Queen Consort travelled to Northern Ireland, where they met members of the public in Royal Hillsborough before arriving at the Castle. The King met the Secretary of State for Northern Ireland, Chris Heaton-Harris, and party leaders, and the Speaker of the Northern Ireland Assembly, Alex Maskey, delivered a message of condolence. The King and the Queen Consort also met major faith leaders in Northern Ireland. A service of reflection was held in St Anne's Cathedral in Belfast on 13 September, where John McDowell, the archbishop of Armagh and head of the Church of Ireland, paid tribute to the Queen for her efforts in bringing peace to Ireland. The service was attended by the King and the Queen Consort, the Prime Minister, the president of Ireland, Michael D. Higgins, and the taoiseach, Micheál Martin. A delegation from the republican Sinn Féin also attended, but the party did not take part in any events marking the accession.

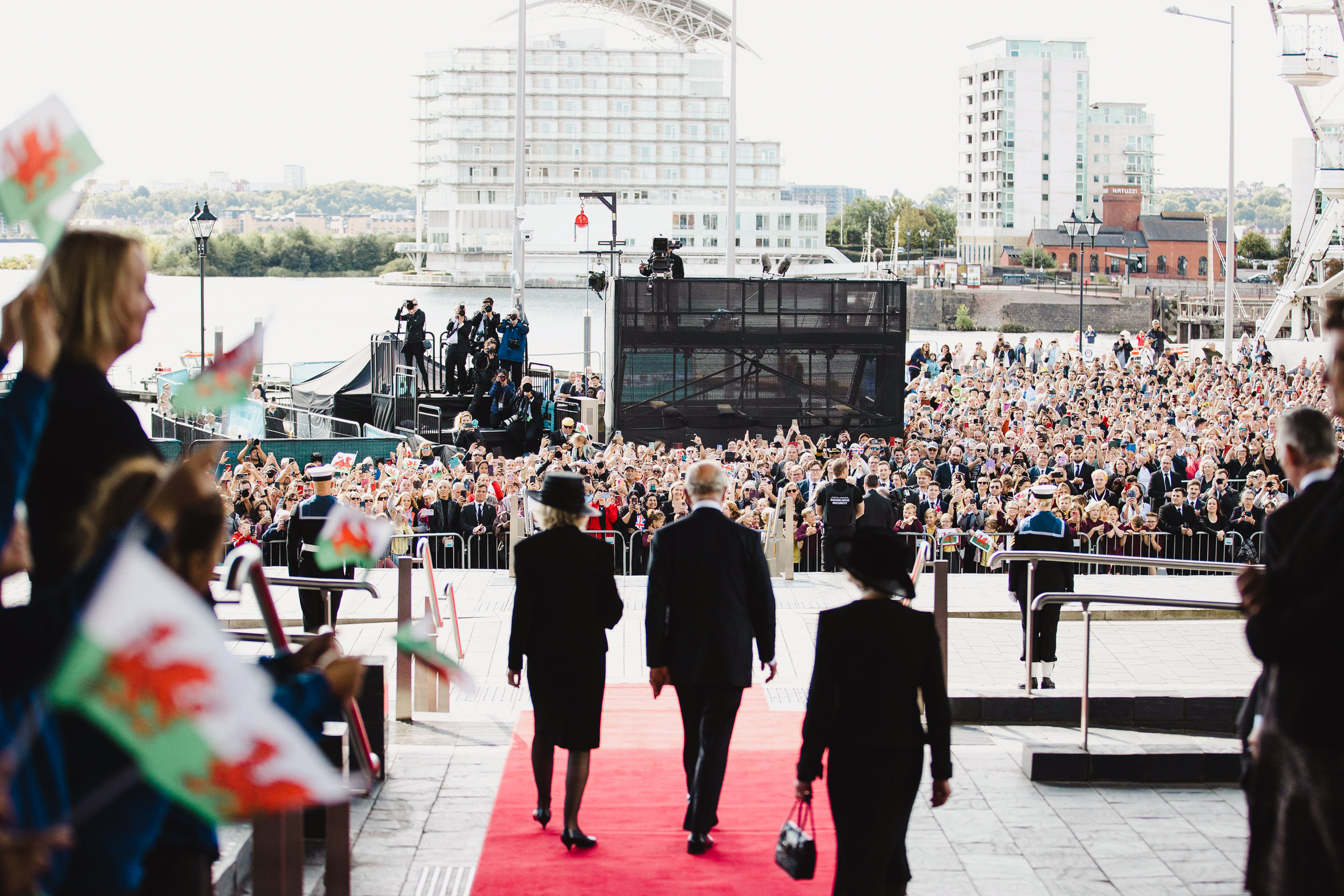
The King and the Queen Consort departing the Senedd after receiving a motion of condolence

On 16 September, the King and the Queen Consort visited Cardiff Castle, where a royal gun salute was fired and crowds gathered inside. A silent protest against the monarchy was held outside by groups including trade unions, and Labour for an Independent Wales. An audience was held for the first minister of Wales and the Llywydd, or presiding officer, of the Senedd. A service of prayer and reflection for the life of the Queen was held at Llandaff Cathedral on 16 September and attended by the King and the Queen Consort. The bishop of Llandaff and leaders of other faiths said the prayers, and the archbishop of Wales delivered an address in both English and Welsh. The service included the singing of Welsh hymns and anthems. The choir accompanied by harpists Alis Huws and Catrin Finch performed the anthem "A Welsh Prayer" composed by Paul Mealor with words by Grahame Davies. (Note: The text of "A Welsh Prayer" is in English.)

At the Senedd the King received a motion of condolence before addressing the parliament in Welsh and English. At Cardiff Castle, the King had audiences with the first minister of Wales, Mark Drakeford, and the Llywydd, Elin Jones. At the castle, they also held audiences with individuals associated with their royal patronages, before meeting with members of the public in the castle grounds. Returning to London, the King met leaders of different faith communities at Buckingham Palace.

On 17 September, the King met the Defence Chiefs of Staff at Buckingham Palace and received the prime ministers of Australia, the Bahamas, Canada, Jamaica, and New Zealand. The governors-general of the Commonwealth realms attended a reception and lunch at Buckingham Palace, hosted by the King and other members of the royal family. The King met emergency services workers at the Metropolitan Police's Special Operations Room in Lambeth, who were organising aspects of the Queen's state funeral. He also visited The Queue with Prince William to speak to its participants.

On 18 September, the King met the prime ministers of Tuvalu, Antigua and Barbuda, and Papua New Guinea at Buckingham Palace. A reception for world leaders was held at Buckingham Palace.

=== Other activities ===
On 10 September, a service at Crathie Kirk was attended by Anne and her husband Sir Timothy Laurence, Andrew, Edward and his wife Sophie, and the Queen's grandchildren Peter Phillips, Zara Tindall, Beatrice, Eugenie, and Lady Louise Mountbatten-Windsor, who then viewed floral tributes outside Balmoral. The King's sons, William and Harry, along with their wives, Catherine and Meghan, viewed floral tributes outside Windsor Castle.

On 15 September, members of the royal family viewed tributes and met crowds around the UK. The Prince and Princess of Wales visited Sandringham House, the Earl and Countess of Wessex visited Manchester, and Princess Anne and Sir Timothy Laurence travelled to Glasgow.

On 16 September, the Prince and Princess of Wales visited the Army Training Centre Pirbright to meet troops deployed from Canada, Australia, and New Zealand who would take part in the state funeral. The Earl and Countess of Wessex met members of the public and viewed tributes at Windsor Castle.

On 17 September, the Earl and Countess of Wessex met crowds outside Buckingham Palace. On 18 September, the Princess of Wales held an audience with Olena Zelenska, the First Lady of Ukraine.

On 22 September, the Prince and Princess of Wales visited the Windsor Guildhall and the Princess Royal visited HMNB Portsmouth, respectively, to thank volunteers and staff and the Royal Navy for their role in organising the state funeral.

== Reactions ==
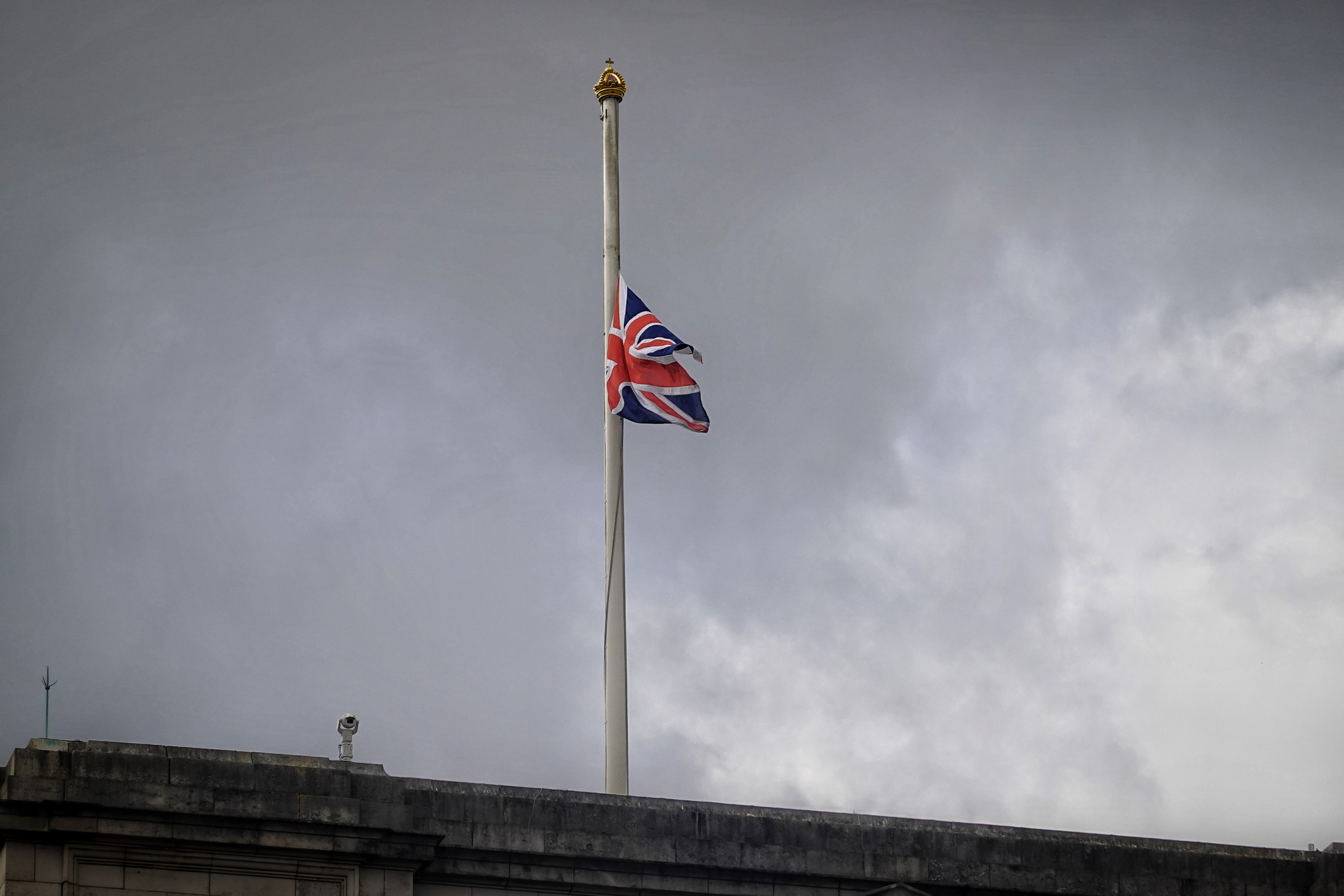
The Union Flag flown at half-mast at Buckingham Palace

Charles III paid tribute to his "darling Mama" in an address to the UK and Commonwealth on 9 September. On 9 September, all flags at royal residences were ordered to be lowered to half-mast except the Royal Standard, which continued to fly at full mast wherever the current monarch was in residence. All royal residences were closed to the public until after the state funeral had occurred. An online book of condolence was set up by the royal website. In a written statement on 18 September, the King thanked the public for their support, and a previously unseen photograph of the Queen from May 2022 was published by the Palace.

On 9 September, the UK government published guidance on details surrounding the national mourning period, stating that businesses, public service, sports fixtures and public venues were not obliged to close. A 96-gun salute was fired in Hyde Park by the King's Troop, Royal Horse Artillery, at the Tower of London by the Honourable Artillery Company, at Edinburgh Castle by the Royal Artillery, at Cardiff Castle and Stonehenge by the 104th Regiment Royal Artillery, at Caernarfon Castle, at York Museum Gardens, and on board Royal Navy ships. Bells tolled at Westminster Abbey, St Paul's Cathedral, and other churches across the UK, Australia, the United States, the Bahamas, and Canada. At Windsor Castle, the Sebastopol Bell, which is rung only to mark the deaths of senior royals, tolled 96 times to mark the years of the Queen's life.

Canadian Prime Minister Justin Trudeau's tribute to the Queen

Politicians throughout the Commonwealth paid tribute to the Queen, praising her long public service. Motions of condolences were also passed in the legislatures of Australia, Canada, New Zealand, and Sri Lanka. A resolution of condolence was also passed in the Senate of the Philippines, which was later handed over to the British ambassador. Other political figures in the rest of the world also offered their condolences and tributes, as did members of royal families, religious leaders and other public figures.

A service of prayer and mourning was held at St Paul's Cathedral at 18:00 on 9 September, attended by senior politicians and 2,000 members of the public. The ceremony marked the first official rendition of "God Save the King" under Charles's reign.

Many organisations paid their respects, and some suspended operations or cancelled events. The BBC, ITV, S4C, Channel 4 and Channel 5 suspended television programming to cover the news, while print media dedicated entire front covers in tribute. Sporting events which went ahead observed minutes of silence.

== Other commemorations ==
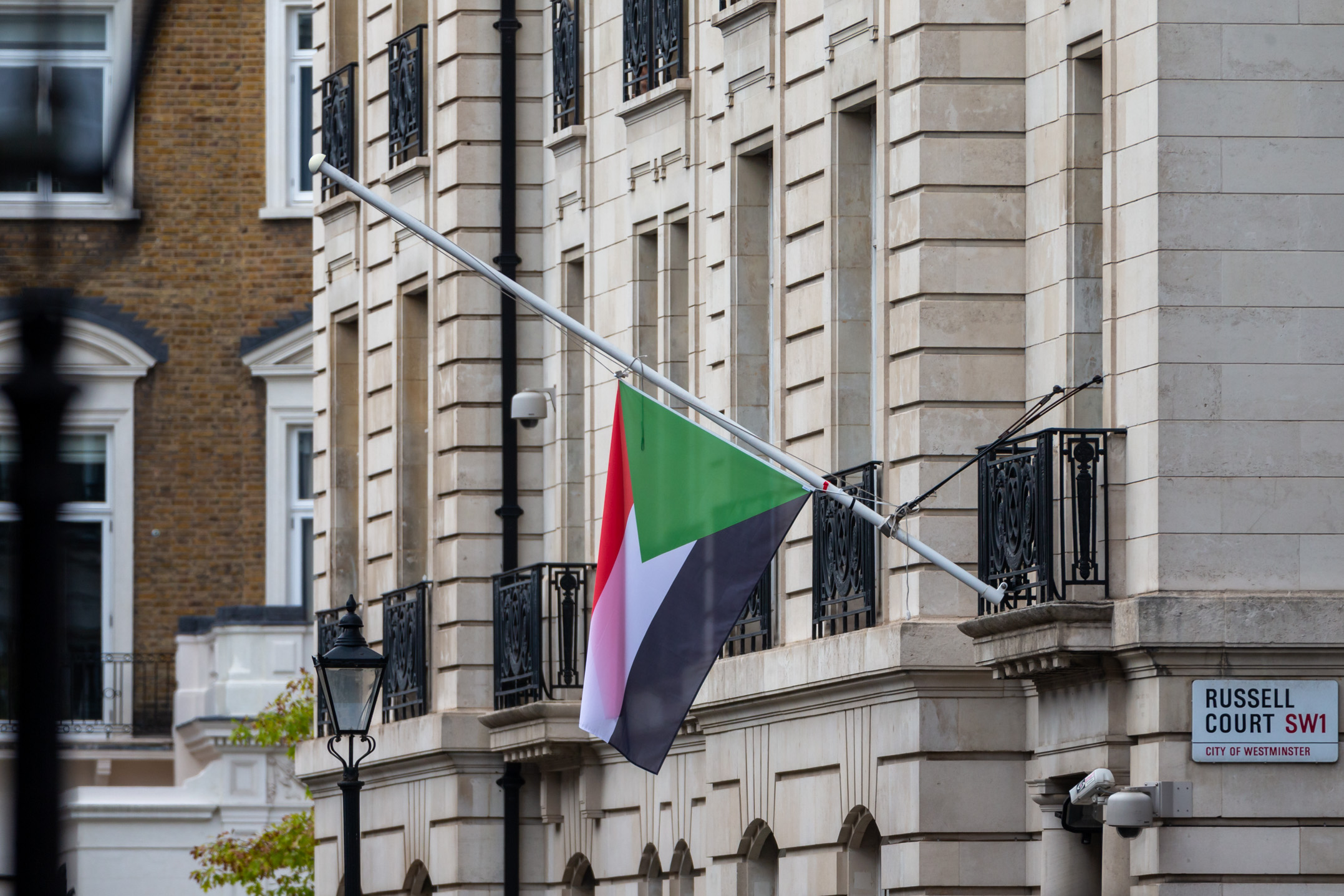
The flag of Sudan at half-mast following the death of the Queen

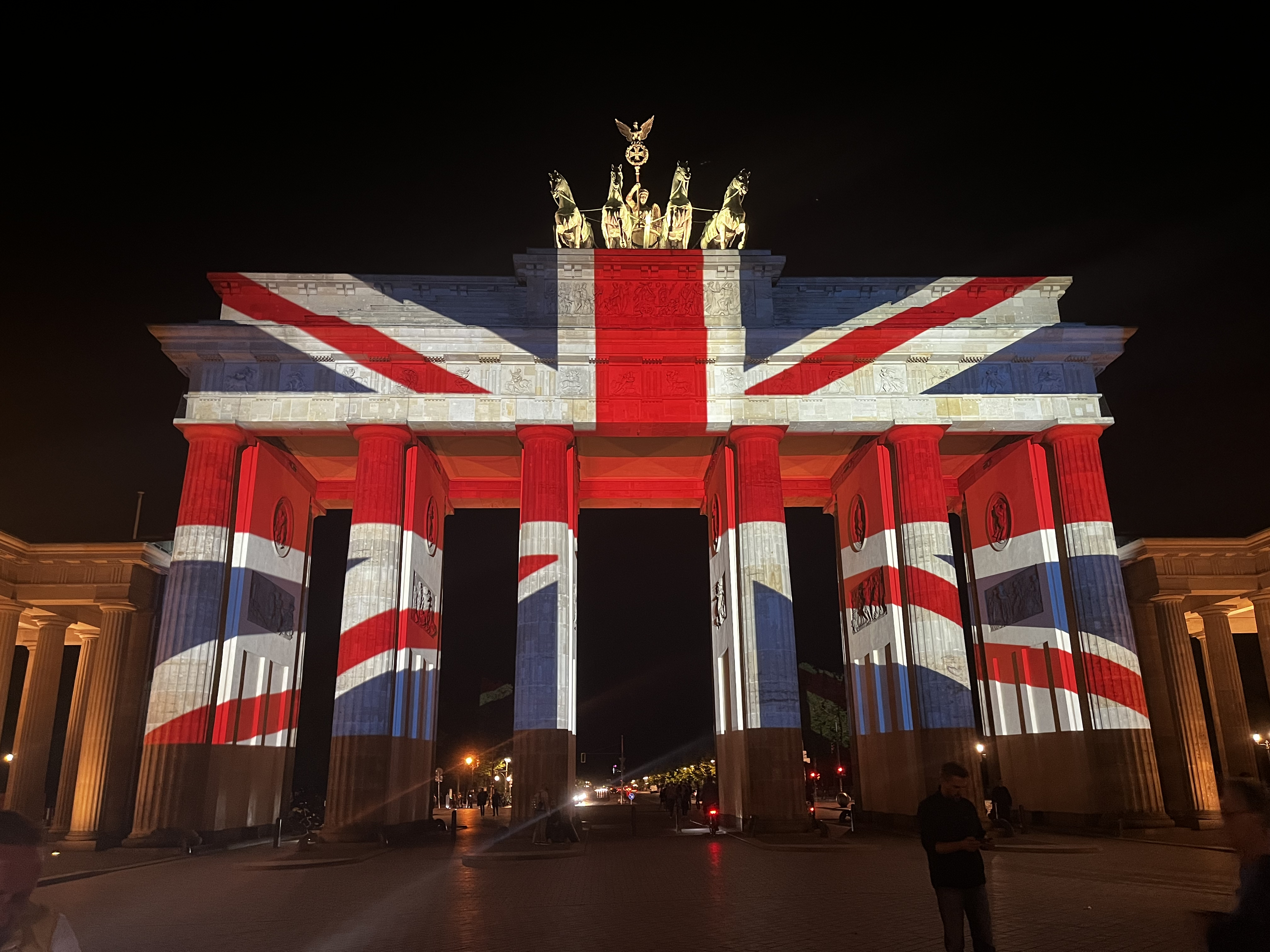
The Brandenburg Gate illuminated with the Union Flag on 16 September as a tribute to the Queen

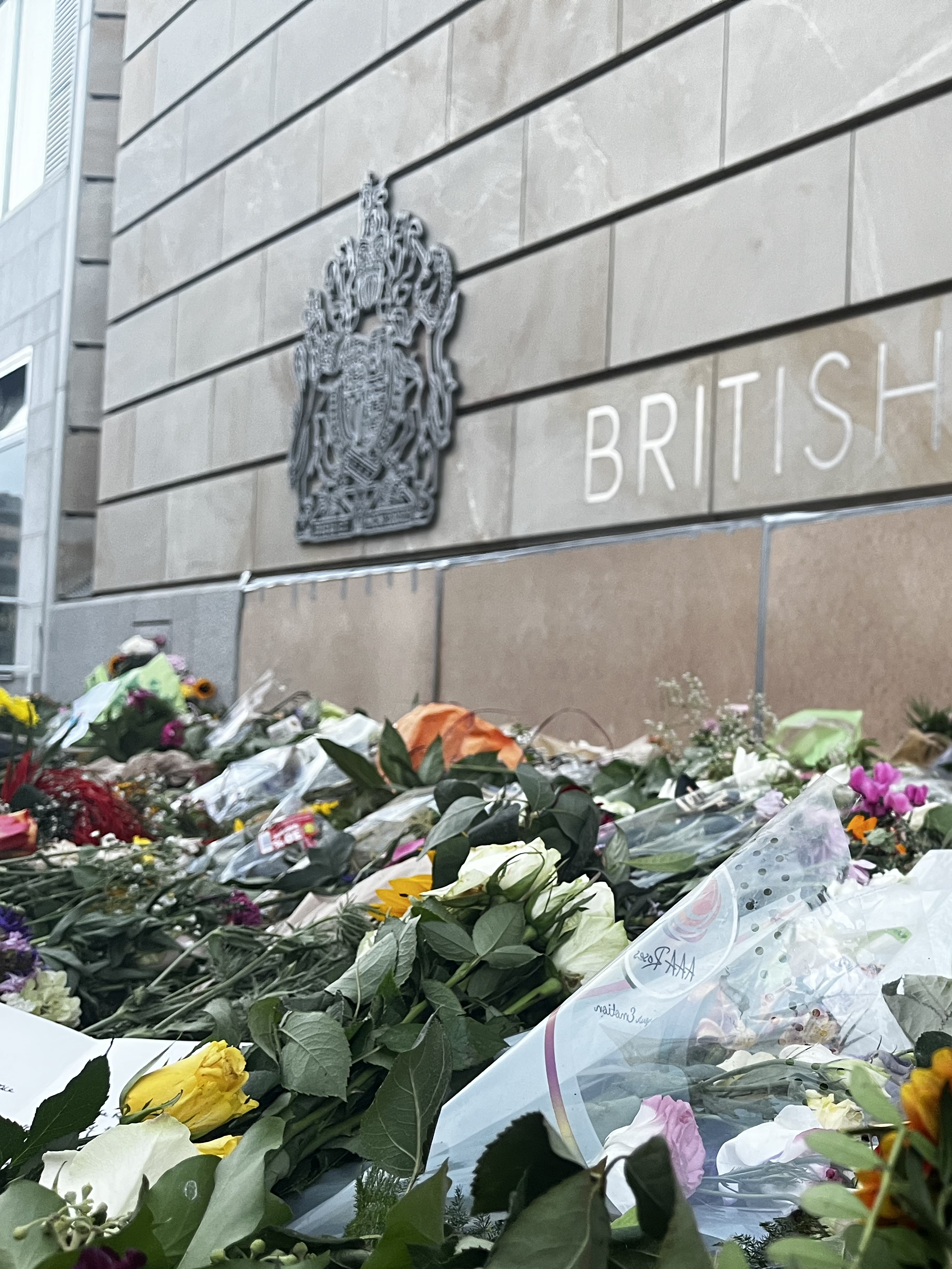
Floral tributes to Elizabeth II at the British Embassy in Berlin

Instructions to fly national flags at half-mast were issued in several countries. In Commonwealth realms like Antigua and Barbuda, Australia, the Bahamas, Belize, Canada, Grenada, Jamaica, New Zealand, Papua New Guinea, Saint Kitts and Nevis, Saint Lucia, Saint Vincent and the Grenadines, and Solomon Islands, national flags were flown at half-mast until the date of the funeral; with the exception of Proclamation Day when flags were returned to full mast. Several other countries also issued instructions to fly their national flags at half-mast, including India, Sri Lanka, the United States, and many European Union buildings. White flags were also put up in Galle Face Green and other prominent places throughout Sri Lanka.

Several Commonwealth countries also declared the Queen's funeral or a specific day as a national holiday, including Antigua and Barbuda, Australia, The Bahamas, Belize, Canada, the Cook Islands, Nauru, New Zealand, Niue, Papua New Guinea, and Sri Lanka. In addition to the service in the United Kingdom, memorial services were held in other Commonwealth realms, including Belize, Grenada, and Tuvalu. Thanksgiving and memorial services were also held in Anglican churches across the world, including Holy Trinity Cathedral in Accra, St Andrew's Church at Bandar Seri Begawan in Brunei, Cathedral of Christ the Living Saviour in Colombo, St. John's Cathedral in Hong Kong, and All Saints' Cathedral in Nairobi.

Many landmarks were illuminated in either purple or royal blue colours to honour the Queen, or illuminated with the name or image of Elizabeth II, her royal cypher, or the Union Flag; including landmarks in Australia, Bosnia and Herzegovina, Brazil, Canada, the Czech Republic, Germany, Israel, Kuwait, New Zealand, Qatar, the United Arab Emirates, the United Kingdom, and the United States. Several landmarks in Canada, France, New Zealand, and the United Kingdom were also dimmed or had their lighting shut off as a sign of respect.

Moments of silence were held across several Commonwealth realms. Several institutions also held moments of silence, including the Dáil Éireann, the Parliament of Sri Lanka, and by the Airborne Commemorations Foundation in the Netherlands.

Flowers, tributes and wreaths were left at British embassies, including Berlin and Jakarta.

=== Antigua and Barbuda ===
Antigua and Barbuda hosted a service of thanksgiving in honour of the late Queen of Antigua and Barbuda on 19 September, which was declared a public holiday throughout the country. The Governor-General's Deputy, Sir Clare Roberts, and the Acting Prime Minister Steadroy Benjamin presided in the absence of Sir Rodney Williams and Gaston Browne respectively, who were both present at the Queen's state funeral in London. The service took place at the Cathedral of St John The Divine and was officiated by Dwane Cassius, Dean of the Cathedral of the Anglican Diocese of the North East Caribbean and Aruba.

The service was followed by a parade of members of the Antigua and Barbuda Defence Force and the Royal Police Force of Antigua and Barbuda. The parade commenced from the Long Street entrance of the cathedral and concluded at the APUA Telephone Exchange, where the parade was dismissed.

=== Australia ===
A 96-gun salute was fired by Australia's Federation Guard on the forecourt of Parliament House in Canberra on 9 September to mark the death of Elizabeth II, in her capacity as Queen of Australia.

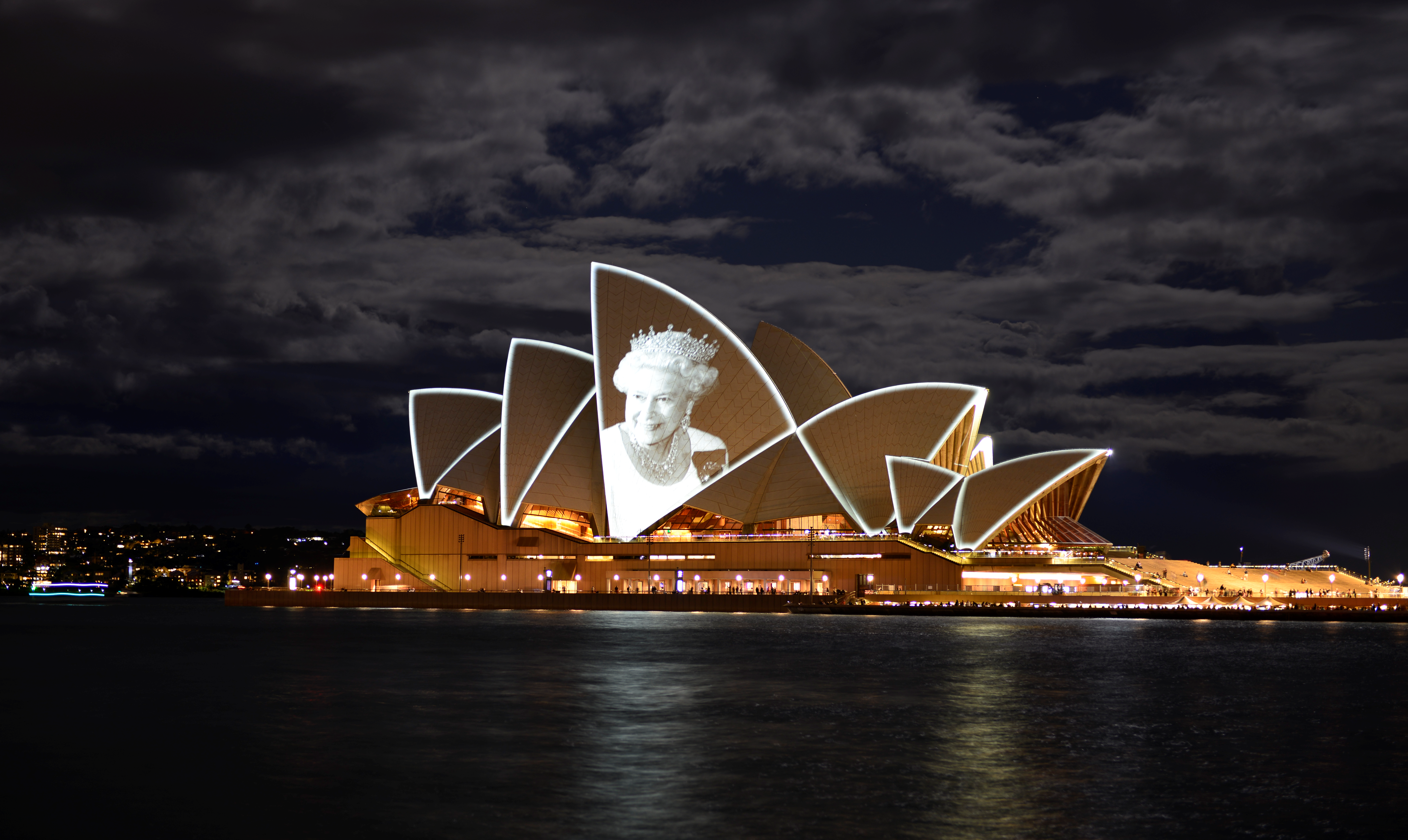
The Sydney Opera House illuminated in the Queen's honour on 10 September

Monuments and landmarks across the country were lit up to honour the Queen. The Sydney Opera House was illuminated with an image of the Queen on the nights of 9 and 10 September, as a symbolic gesture on behalf of the Government of New South Wales. The Australian Parliament House was lit up with images of the Queen throughout her seven-decade reign, reflecting her long and deep relationship with Australia. Landmarks across Perth and Melbourne were illuminated in "royal purple" in honour of the Queen.

A national memorial service for the Queen took place on 22 September at Parliament House in Canberra. The National Day of Mourning was observed as a "one-off public holiday". One minute's silence was observed at 11:00 across Australia. Plans were announced for a new public square in central Sydney bearing the late Queen's name.

=== The Bahamas ===
A state memorial service for Elizabeth II, Queen of the Bahamas, was held at Christ Church Cathedral in Nassau on 2 October. A procession of parliamentarians and law enforcement officers preceded the service, which started at Rawson Square, Bay Street. Governor General Sir Cornelius A. Smith, and Prime Minister Philip Davis were among those who addressed the congregation.

=== Bhutan ===
Upon royal command, special prayers were performed in all major dzongs, temples and monasteries across Bhutan. King Jigme Khesar Namgyel Wangchuck and Queen Jetsun Pema offered 1,000 butterlamps at Samtse on 9 September for Elizabeth II. Special prayers to offer light (called marme moenlam) were held at the ceremony, which was attended by the prime minister, government officials, and thousands of people in Samtse. Thongdrels of Guru Rinpoche and Zhabdrung were unfurled for the ceremony, to sanctify the important occasion.

In Thimphu, former King Jigme Singye Wangchuck and members of the royal family were joined by government officials and foreign dignitaries to offer 1,000 butter lamps and prayers at the Grand Kuenrey of the Tashichhodzong.

=== Canada ===
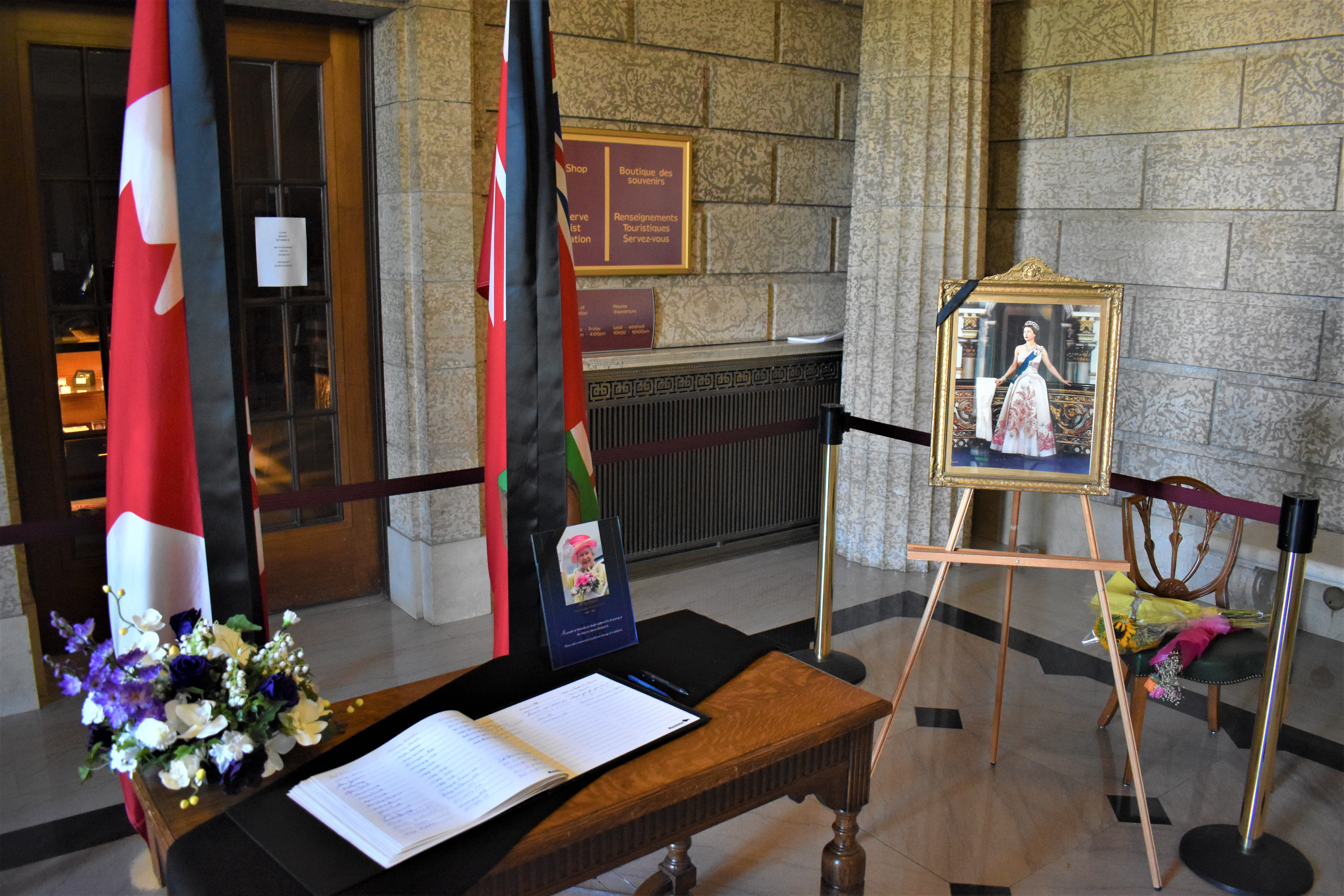
A book of condolence for the Queen in the Manitoba Legislative Building

Various locations were illuminated in honour of the late Queen of Canada as a part of the Department of Canadian Heritage's national illumination initiative. The Canadian government also announced a donation of C$20 million to the Queen Elizabeth Scholars program, a program that funds Canadian university exchange programs.

Prime Minister Justin Trudeau announced that the date of the Queen's funeral would be a holiday for federal government employees. Among the Canadian provinces and territories, Prince Edward Island was the only one to declare the date of Elizabeth II's funeral a statutory holiday. Alberta, the Northwest Territories, Saskatchewan, Manitoba, Ontario and Quebec declared a day of mourning or commemoration instead of a holiday. In the remaining provinces and territories government offices closed, some also closed schools, (Note: New Brunswick, Newfoundland and Labrador, and Nova Scotia) and observance was optional for private-sector businesses. The Retail Council of Canada and Canadian Federation of Independent Business were against making the funeral a statutory paid holiday.

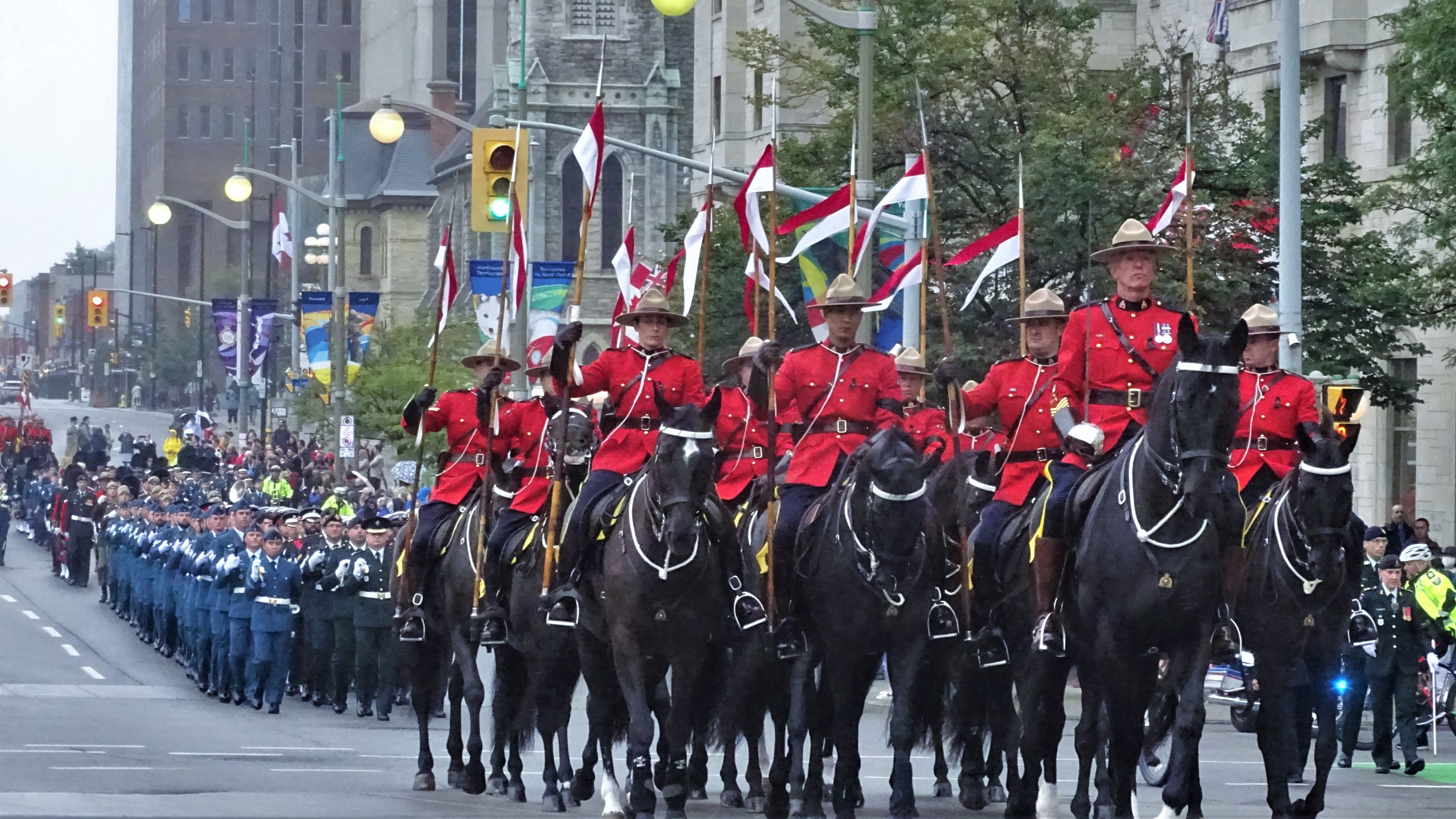
The memorial parade before the Canadian commemorative ceremony

A national commemorative ceremony took place at the Christ Church Cathedral in Ottawa on 19 September, which was broadcast live on television as well as on social media. The ceremony was preceded by a parade of the Canadian Armed Forces and Royal Canadian Mounted Police through downtown Ottawa, from Cartier Square Drill Hall and past Parliament Hill to the cathedral, with a 96-gun salute. A flypast by the Royal Canadian Air Force was cancelled owing to inclement weather. The congregation was addressed by former Governor-General Adrienne Clarkson as well as former Prime Minister Brian Mulroney.

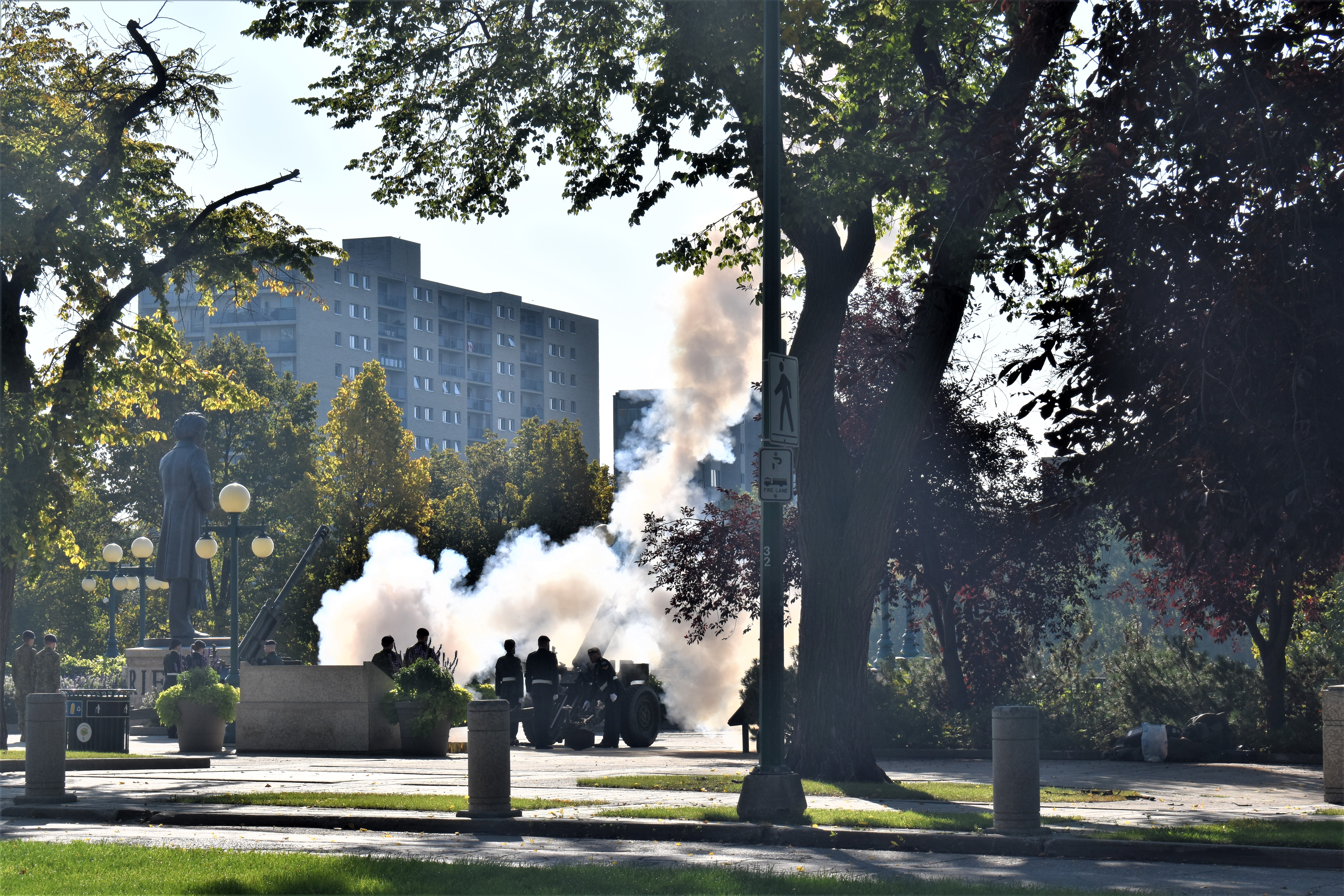
Gun salute in honour of the Queen on the grounds of the Manitoba Legislative Building

Provincial commemorative services took place in several provinces on 19 September: in Alberta, British Columbia, Manitoba, New Brunswick, Newfoundland and Labrador, Nova Scotia, Prince Edward Island, and Saskatchewan. In Ontario, a memorial service was held in Toronto on 20 September. Two memorial services in Quebec were organised by the Anglican Church rather than the provincial government, which were attended by Lieutenant Governor Michel Doyon.

Moments of silence were held across several provinces on 19 September, with several transit operators having paused their operations for 96 seconds to coincide with the moment of silence. A 96-gun salute was also organised at Fort Wellington in Prescott, Ontario.

In December 2022, the Royal Canadian Mint introduced a commemorative C$2 coin with a black outer ring, meant to symbolise mourning for the Queen. The Mint produced an initial batch of five million C$2 coins for circulation, with further batches to be made as "marketplace needs" allow. In January 2023, the Mint announced the launch of a new series of limited edition silver, gold, and platinum collectible coins in honour of Elizabeth II.

=== Fiji ===
The Holy Trinity Anglican Cathedral in Suva hosted a special Service of Remembrance and Thanksgiving on 16 September in memory of the Queen. The service was attended by hundreds, including President Ratu Wiliame Katonivere and First Lady Filomena, Parliament Speaker Ratu Epeli Nailatikau, Minister for Health Ifereimi Waqainabete, former Prime Minister Sitiveni Rabuka, Police Commissioner Brigadier-General Sitiveni Qiliho, Head of the Catholic Church in Fiji Archbishop Peter Loy Chong, members of the diplomatic corps and the public. During the service, the Republic of Fiji Military Services provided "The Last Post", signalling the end of the Queen's 70-year reign.

On 20 September, President Katonivere hosted a Commemoration and Thanksgiving Service for the Queen at State House in Suva, which was attended by senior officials, government ministers, members of parliament and foreign representatives. The President reflected on the Queen's six visits to Fiji, which he said symbolised strong solidarity between Fiji and the royal family.

=== France ===
French postal service La Poste issued a book of four collector stamps featuring the Queen. Fifty thousand stamps were put on sale on the day of the Queen's funeral.

It was announced that Le Touquet's local airport would be renamed Le Touquet-Paris-Plage Elizabeth II to honour the Queen. In Paris, the George V Métro station, on Line 1 under the Champs-Élysées, was renamed Elizabeth II for the day of the Queen's state funeral.

=== Hong Kong ===
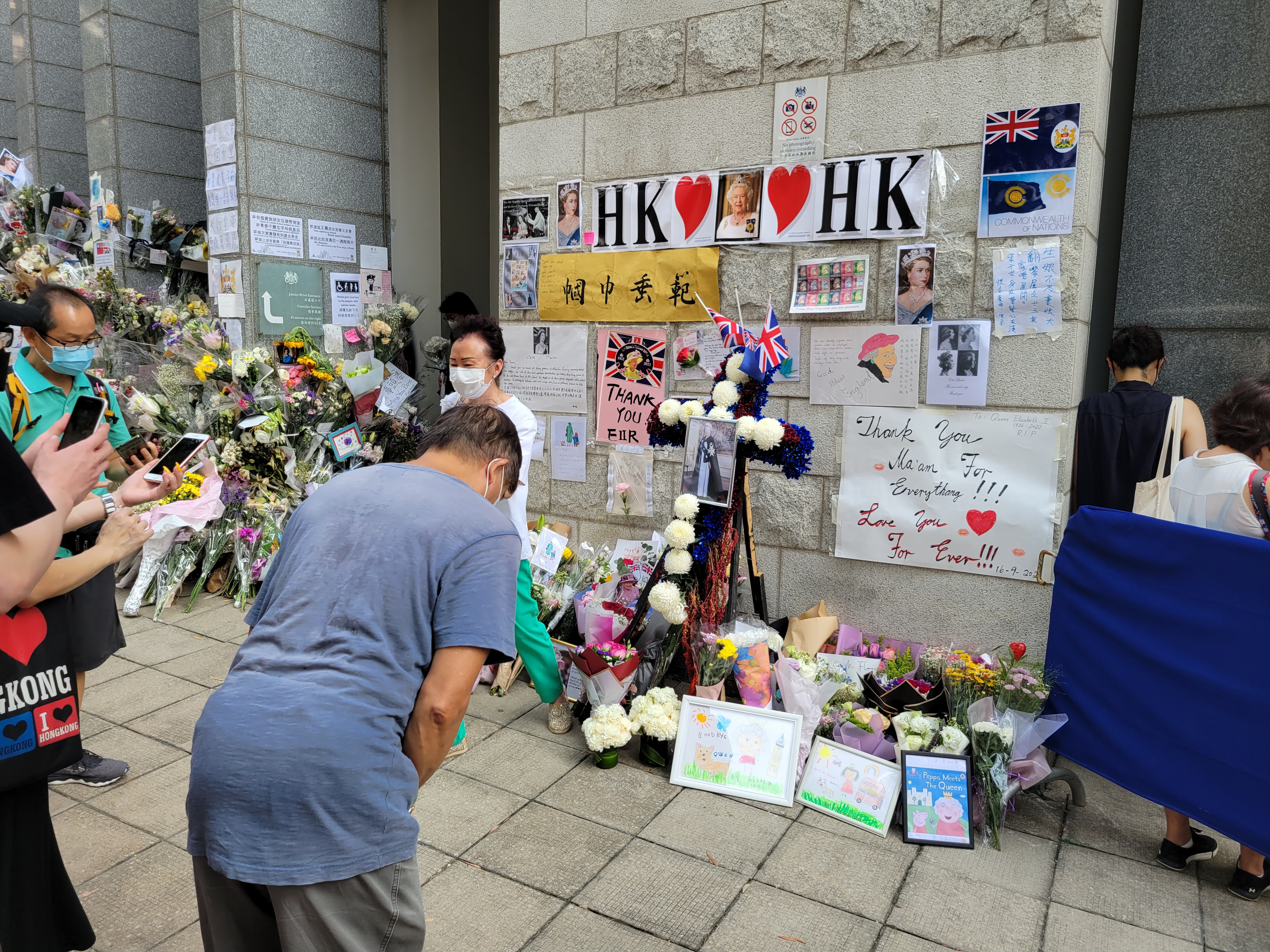
A man paying his respects to the Queen in front of a makeshift memorial at the British consulate in Hong Kong

Thousands in Hong Kong paid tribute to the Queen, who was the colonial head of the city for 45 years before handover in 1997. Long queues were seen outside the British consulate for days after the announcement of the death and until the funeral, with mourners waiting up to four hours. More than 13,000 signed the condolence books in the consulate in 11 days, eulogising the "boss lady", an affectionate nickname for the Queen by the Hongkongers. The tribute, which was one of the largest public gatherings since the imposition of the national security law and the crackdown on the democracy movement, was also regarded as a protest to Hong Kong and Chinese authorities and a mourning of the past.

Eric Chan, Chief Secretary for Administration and second-highest-ranking official in the city, visited the consulate and signed the condolence book on behalf of the government. Nevertheless, the pro-Beijing newspaper Ta Kung Pao accused a "minority" of Hong Kong mourners for "indulging in this fantasy that they are subjects of the British Empire", and called for the eradication of colonialism.

On the day of the Queen's funeral, hundreds gathered outside the consulate watching a live broadcast of the event. A harmonica player was arrested under a colonial-era sedition law after playing "Glory to Hong Kong", a protest song prominently used in the 2019–2020 Hong Kong protests for which there had been previous arrests; he also played "God Save the King".

=== India ===
The Government of India declared a national day of mourning, with the Indian flag flown at half mast and no official entertainment held on the day.

=== Jamaica ===
After the announcement of the death of the Queen of Jamaica on 8 September 2022, bells were tolled nationally in churches throughout all parish capitals for one hour beginning at 6:00 pm. Books of condolence were established at King's House, and in the Offices of the Custodes in all parishes during the mourning period. A 96-gun salute was fired by the Jamaica Defence Force at Up-Park Camp in St Andrew on 19 September.

A national memorial service for the Queen held on 2 October at the St. Andrew Parish Church in Kingston was attended by government officials and foreign representatives. The service was headed by Governor-General Sir Patrick Allen, Prime Minister Andrew Holness, and Mark Golding, the leader of the official opposition. The service included scripture readings by the governor-general, the prime minister and the leader of the opposition, as well as tributes in songs by the church choir and the Kingston College Choir.

Apart from the national memorial service in Kingston, services were held in the parishes of Clarendon, Saint Catherine, Saint Ann, Portland, Saint Mary, Saint Thomas, Saint Elizabeth, Saint James, Westmoreland, Hanover, Manchester, and Trelawny. The custodes and mayors headed the memorial services in parishes across Jamaica.

=== Kenya ===
Former staff returned to the Treetops Hotel near Nyeri, Kenya, the building where Elizabeth learned about the death of her father and her accession to the throne, to light candles and lay out a condolence book.

=== Malta ===
Flowers and wreaths were laid by the Maltese people outside Villa Guardamangia in Pietà, where as a princess, the Queen lived with Prince Philip between 1949 and 1951, while Philip was stationed in Malta as a serving Royal Navy officer.

In the days leading up to the funeral, an online petition calling for a statue to be created in the Queen's honor garnered some 1,400 signatures.

The day of the state funeral was observed as a national day of mourning, with national flags across the country flown at half-staff. At 11:45 am local time, a 21-gun salute was fired across the Grand Harbour by gunners of the Armed Forces of Malta on behalf of the Office of the Prime Minister, to mark the death of the Queen. The timing of the gun salute coincided with the departure of the Queen's coffin from Westminster Hall in London.

At The Phoenicia hotel, where the Queen danced in balls during her time in Malta, people gathered in the Club Bar to watch the funeral service.

=== New Zealand ===
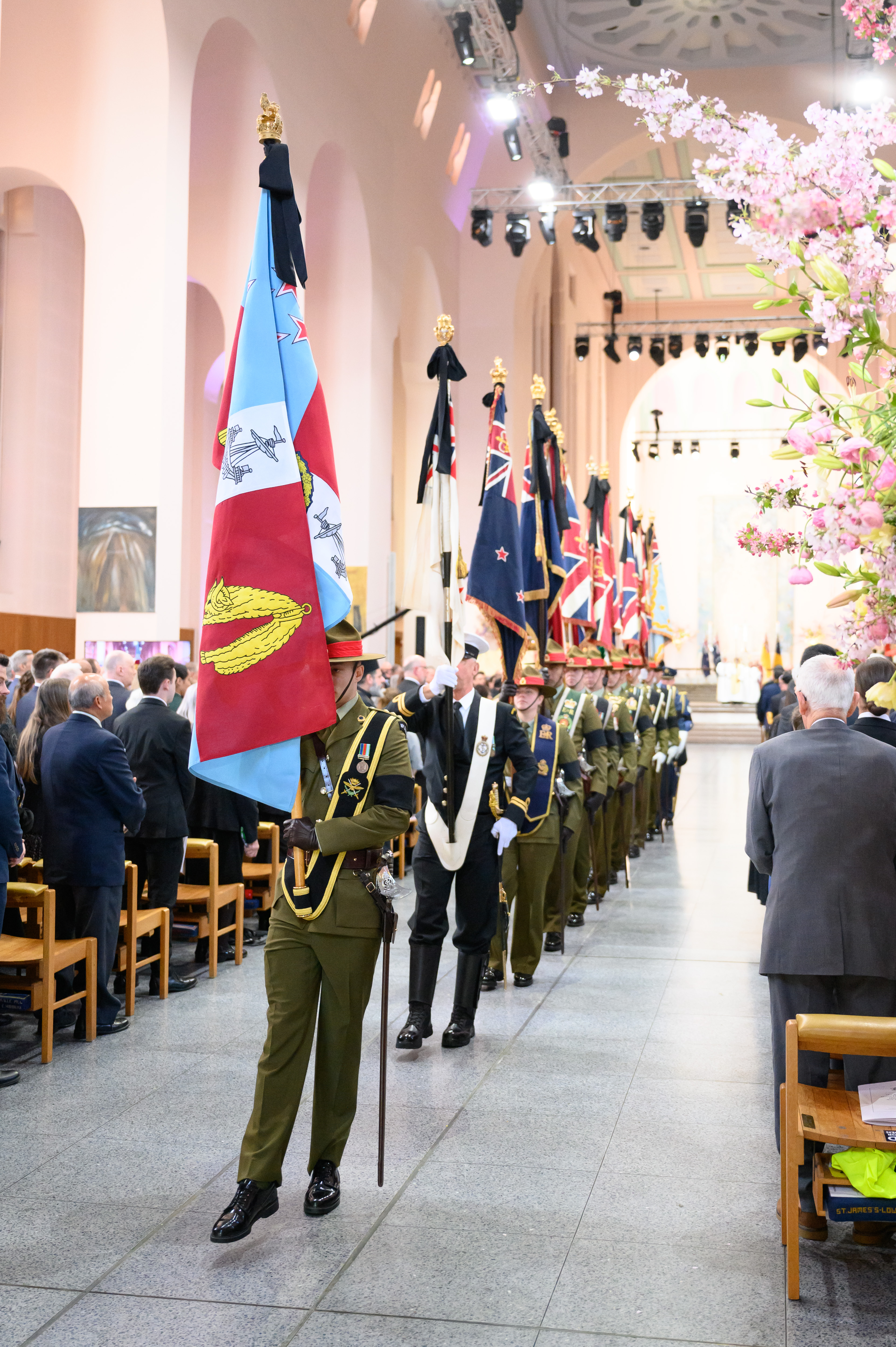
The Queen's Personal New Zealand Flag paraded at the New Zealand State Memorial Service

A 96-gun salute was fired from the Te Papa Promenade in Wellington on 9 September, by personnel from the 16th Field Regiment, Royal New Zealand Artillery based at Linton Military Camp, to mark the death of Elizabeth II, Queen of New Zealand.

At the Auckland War Memorial Museum, a haka was led by members of the Limited Service Volunteer programme to honour the Queen.

A state memorial service with a one-off public holiday took place on 26 September to celebrate the life and reign of the Queen of New Zealand. The service took place at the Wellington Cathedral of St Paul at 14:00 and was televised and live-streamed. A national minute of silence took place at the beginning of the service, with people across New Zealand being invited to participate in the moment of silence. During the service, the Queen's Personal New Zealand Flag was paraded for the last time.

Memorial services were also held elsewhere in New Zealand including in Auckland, Christchurch, New Plymouth and Hastings. South Canterbury Anniversary Day, which was due to be observed on 26 September in the Timaru, Waimate and Mackenzie districts, was moved to Friday 11 November.

==== Cook Islands ====
The King's Representative, Sir Tom Marsters, proclaimed 30 September a public holiday in the Cook Islands in respect of the Queen's passing. On the morning of the holiday, the government held a memorial service for the Queen at the National Auditorium in Avarua. The service was attended by Marsters, traditional leaders, members of the Religious Advisory Council, Queen's Award recipients, the high commissioners of New Zealand and Australia, Members of Parliament, members of the various uniform organisations, and members of the public.

==== Niue ====
Two days of commemoration took place in Niue to mark the death of the Queen, who was Niue's head of state. A series of events took place on 18 and 19 September, with the latter being a public holiday. On 19 September, a national memorial service was held at the Taoga Niue starting at 08:00. A national moment of reflection took place at 08:15, with people across Niue taking part. People were also asked to plant a tree on 19 September in memory of the Queen.

=== Papua New Guinea ===
On 12 September, a 96-gun salute was fired in honour of the Queen, and a moment of silence took place outside Parliament House in Port Moresby.

On 18 September, members of various Anglican Church parishes in Port Moresby gathered at St Martin's Anglican parish for a memorial service for the late Queen of Papua New Guinea, which was presided over by the Bishop of Popondota, Lindsley Ihove.

=== Saint Lucia ===
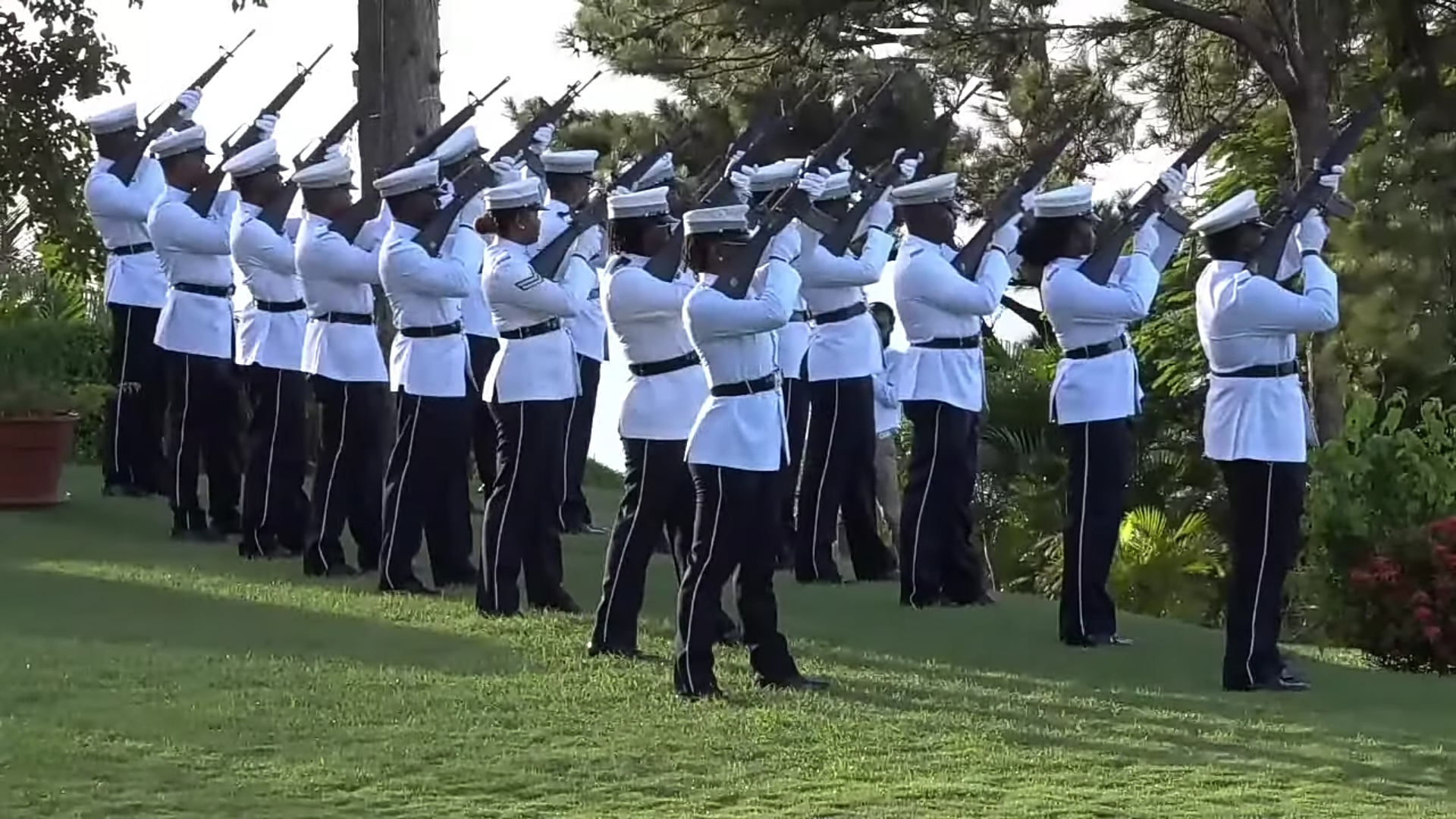
A 96-gun salute at Government House, Saint Lucia

On 9 September, a 96-gun salute was fired by the Royal Saint Lucia Police Force on the premises of Government House in Castries.

On 19 September, the day of the state funeral, the public was invited to pause for a 70-second national tribute to reflect on the life and legacy of Elizabeth II, Queen of Saint Lucia. Church bells and sirens from fire stations throughout the nation sounded for one minute and 10 seconds starting at 09:59 to herald the commencement of the 70-second reflection period at 10:00.

=== Solomon Islands ===
In the Solomon Islands, Prime Minister Manasseh Sogavare declared 12 to 14 September as days of mourning, with the first being a public holiday. The three-day national mourning period began on 12 September with a wreath-laying and signing of the condolence book at Government House by national leaders including Sogavare, Governor-General Sir David Vunagi, Speaker of the National Parliament Patteson Oti and Chief Justice Sir Albert Palmer; as well as other government officials, former governors-general and prime ministers, members of diplomatic missions and uniformed groups.

A memorial church service was held at the Saint Barnabas Anglican Cathedral on 14 September in remembrance of Elizabeth II, Queen of Solomon Islands. The service was attended by Oti (acting as Governor-General), Sogavare, Palmer, Deputy Speaker Commins Mewa, former governors-general, acting British High Commissioner Steve Auld and senior government officials.

=== Sweden ===
A Serafimerringning was held to honour the Queen in her capacity as a member of the Royal Order of the Seraphim, the foremost order of Sweden, on the day of her funeral on 19 September. The Queen was awarded the order by King Gustaf VI Adolf on 26 May 1953, and the chain of the Order was given to her by King Carl XVI Gustaf on 23 May 1975. The Queen was the 722nd member of the Order since its inception in 1748. The Queen's royal coat of arms as a member of the Royal Order of the Seraphim was then taken in procession from the palace to Riddarholmen Church in Stockholm, where the bourdon rang a traditional Seraphim Toll for one hour. The arms were then hung in the church. By command of the King of Sweden, flags above royal residences were flown at half-mast on the day.

=== United Kingdom ===
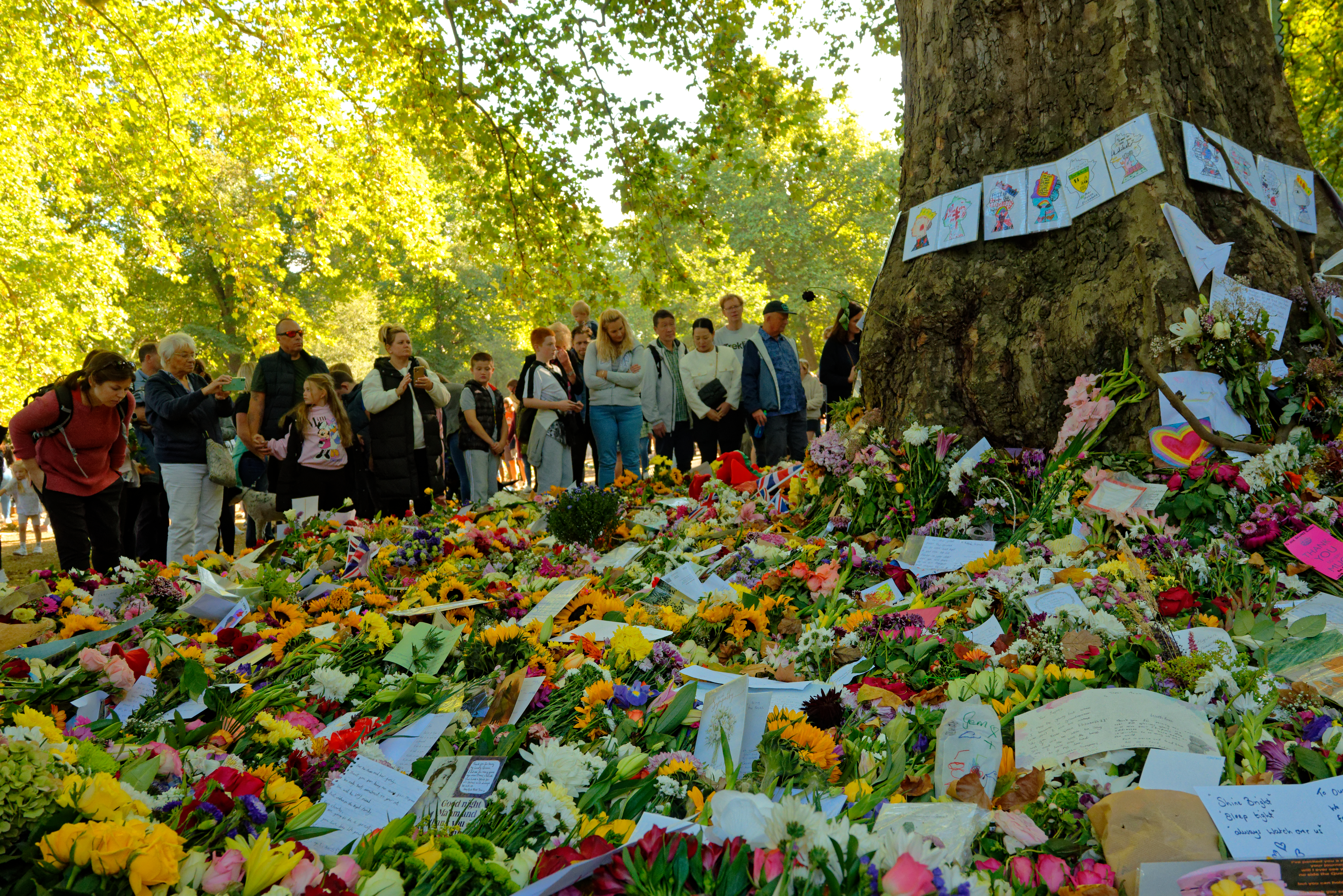
Some of the floral tributes left by the public in Green Park, London

The Church of England issued guidance for services of commemoration to be held in parish churches. On the evening before the state funeral, some four thousand people attended an open air memorial service at The Kelpies near Falkirk, led by Martin Fair, during which ninety-six lanterns, one for each year of the Queen's life, were placed on the "pool of reflection" at the foot of the sculpture.

Shortly after the announcement of the Queen's death, London black cab drivers lined The Mall in tribute. Mourners in London covered the gates, railings and pavement outside Buckingham Palace with flowers until a floral tribute area was opened in the adjacent Green Park; during the mourning period, it was estimated that 15 tonnes of bouquets were left there. Large quantities of flowers were also left at Windsor Castle where they obstructed footpaths. Mourners left more than a thousand teddy bears and particularly Paddington Bear toys, in reference to a popular short film in which the Queen had appeared with Paddington at the Platinum Party at the Palace. The toys were later cleaned and presented to Barnardo's, a children's charity, by the Queen Consort.

Tributes to the Queen were projected on billboards at Piccadilly Circus and on the BT Tower, as well as on advertising screens throughout the country. The Royal Mail issued four commemorative stamps showing the Queen at different stages in her life.

=== United States ===
On 21 September, a memorial service was held at the Washington National Cathedral, arranged in conjunction with the British Embassy in Washington, D.C. Attendees included Vice President Kamala Harris, House Speaker Nancy Pelosi and House Minority Leader Kevin McCarthy, as well as British ambassador Karen Pierce. All living former US presidents were invited, but none attended. A sermon was delivered by Michael Curry, the presiding bishop of the Episcopal Church.

== See also ==
- List of largest funerals
