= BL 12-pounder 6 cwt gun =

Ordnance BL 12-pounder 6 cwt
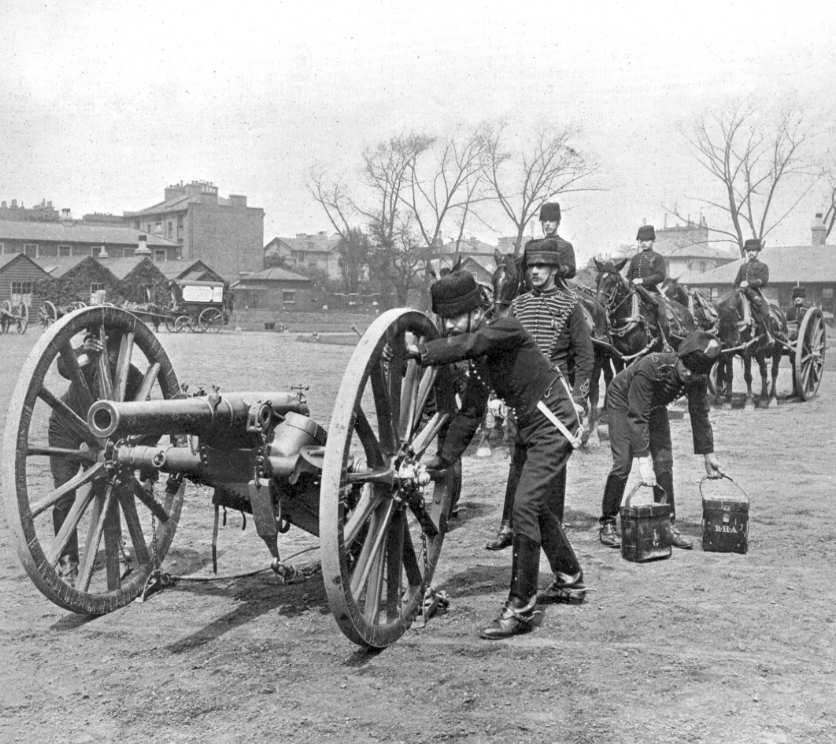
- On the parade ground, probably at St John's Wood Barracks, c. 1897
- Type: Light field gun
- Place of origin: United Kingdom

Service history
- In service: 1894–1916
- Used by: British Empire
- Wars: Second Boer War; World War I

Specifications
- Mass: Mk IV : 656 pounds (298 kg) (barrel & breech), 2,008 pounds (911 kg) (total)
- Barrel length: Mk I : Bore 59 inches (1,499 mm); Mk IV : Bore 66 inches (1,676 mm), total 71.05 inches (1,805 mm)
- Shell: Separate loading BL, 12.5 pounds (5.67 kg) Shrapnel
- Calibre: 3-inch (76.2 mm)
- Elevation: −8° − 16°
- Traverse: nil
- Rate of fire: 7-8 rounds/minute
- Muzzle velocity: 1,585 feet per second (483 m/s)
- Maximum firing range: 3700 yds (No. 56 Fuze, Time setting); 5800 yds (No. 57 Fuze, Time setting); 5400 yds (No. 56 Fuze, Percussion setting)

The Ordnance BL 12-pounder 6 cwt (Note: British military traditionally denoted smaller ordnance by the weight of its standard projectile, in this case approximately 12 pounds (5.4 kg). "6 cwt" referred to the weight of the gun and barrel to differentiate it from other "12-pounder" guns. One hundredweight (cwt) is 112 pounds (51 kg), so the total weight was 672 pounds (305 kg)) was a lighter version of the British 12-pounder 7 cwt gun, used by the Royal Horse Artillery in the late 19th and early 20th centuries.

== History ==
Problems arose when the standard BL 12-pounder 7 cwt gun was used in the great Indian cavalry manoeuvres of 1891. The carriage was found to be too complicated, and dust caused the metal surfaces of the axle traversing device to seize. It also proved too heavy for horse artillery, which was intended to support cavalry in battle, to manoeuvre.

The 12-pounder 6 cwt gun was therefore developed in 1892, when the new more powerful cordite replaced gunpowder, as a lighter version of the BL 12-pounder 7 cwt gun. It had a barrel 18 inches (460 mm) shorter, on a lighter and simpler carriage, and it entered service in 1894. In 1899 a primitive recoil-absorbing system was added. The weapon was made obsolete in British service by the acquisition of the modern quick-firing Ehrhardt QF 15-pounder in 1901, and was replaced by that and later by the QF 13-pounder from 1905.

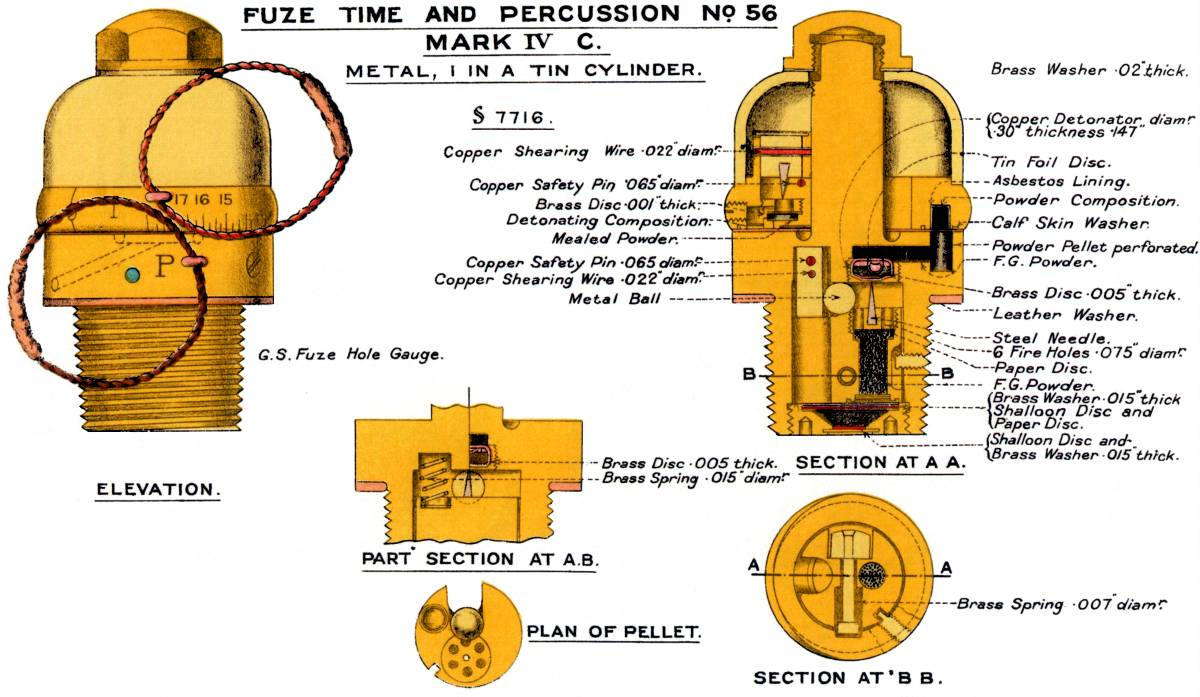
No. 56 Fuze

The early No. 56 Fuze burned too fast, a maximum of only 13 seconds, and hence could only be time set for a maximum range of 3,700 yd (3,400 m). The No. 57 "Blue" Fuze was introduced during the Boer war. It had a slower burning powder train and hence could be time set for ranges up to 5,800 yd (5,300 m). A maximum range of 6,000 yd (5,500 m) was quoted in use in the First World War.

== Combat use ==
=== Second Boer War ===
The gun was used by the Royal Horse Artillery, and together with the BL 15-pounder, it provided the main British firepower. Eighteen guns were also used by the Royal Canadian Artillery in this war. A total of 78 guns fired 36,161 shells.

=== World War I ===
A battery of 6 guns served in the East African Campaign as the 8th Field Battery. It arrived with the Calcutta Artillery Volunteers in October 1914, and the guns were towed by teams of oxen.

== See also ==
- Field artillery
- List of field guns

== Surviving examples ==
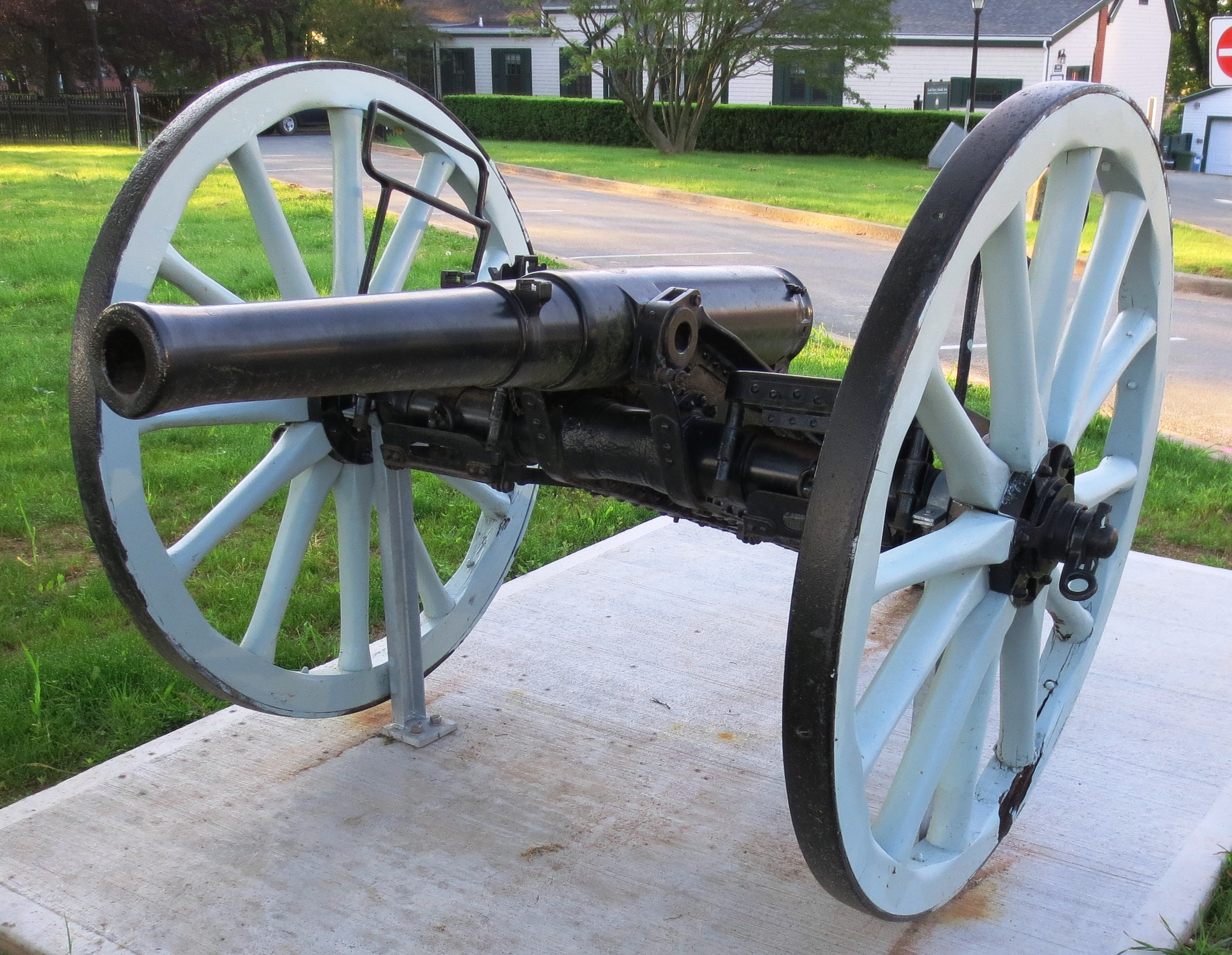
A survivor in the Royal Artillery Park (Halifax)

- The Central Museum of The Royal Regiment of Canadian Artillery, Shilo, Manitoba
- One piece made in 1901 and marked "RCD 1907" on gun-metal sight mount, with King Edward VII cypher and crown inletted in top of barrel, parked in front of Stethem Hall, the HQ building of CFB Kingston.
- Gun used by "D" Battery, Royal Canadian Field Artillery, at Leliefontein. Preserved at the Canadian War Museum

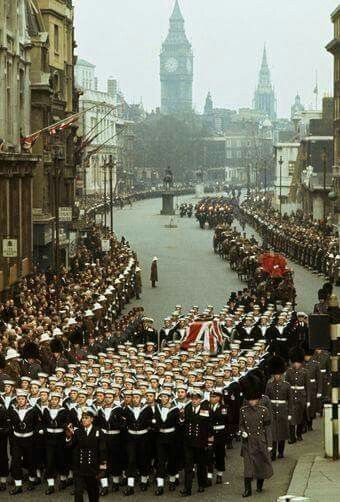
Churchill's funeral procession in London, 1965. The Union Flag covers Churchill's coffin on the gun carriage.

- The Royal Navy State Funeral Gun Carriage, used to carry the coffin of the deceased during State funerals in the United Kingdom. In this role it is not pulled by horses but by ratings of the Royal Navy. State funerals are normally reserved for the monarch although a few notable non-monarch individuals like Winston Spencer Churchill and Lord Mountbatten have been given this honour, the most recent such funeral being Queen Elizabeth II's on 19 September 2022.

== Bibliography ==
- Text Book of Gunnery, 1902. LONDON : PRINTED FOR HIS MAJESTY'S STATIONERY OFFICE, BY HARRISON AND SONS, ST. MARTIN'S LANE
- Dale Clarke, British Artillery 1914–1919. Field Army Artillery. Osprey Publishing, Oxford UK, 2004 ISBN 1-84176-688-7
- General Sir Martin Farndale, History of the Royal Regiment of Artillery: Forgotten Fronts and the Home Base 1914–18 ISBN 1-870114-05-1
- Major Darrell D. Hall, "Guns in South Africa 1899-1902" in The South African Military History Society. Military History Journal – Vol 2 No 1, June 1971
- Major Darrell D. Hall, "Field Artillery of the British Army 1860–1960. Part I, 1860 – 1900" in The South African Military History Society. Military History Journal – Vol 2 No 4, December 1972 (web page is incorrectly titled 1900–1914)
- I.V. Hogg & L.F. Thurston, British Artillery Weapons & Ammunition 1914–1918. London: Ian Allan, 1972
