= Royal Navy State Funeral Gun Carriage =

Gun carriage used at British state funerals

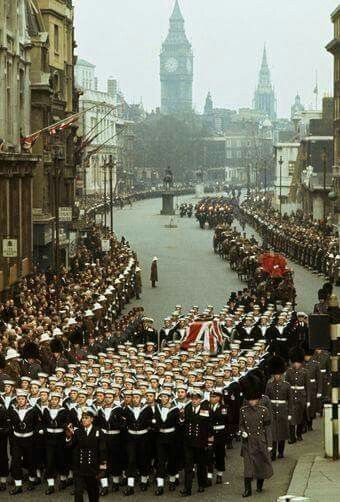
Royal Navy State Funeral Gun Carriage at Churchill's funeral, January 1965

The Royal Navy State Funeral Gun Carriage is a converted Ordnance, BL, 12 pdr 6 cwt, MK II, gun carriage which has been used in the UK to bear the coffin at the funeral processions of: Queen Victoria; King Edward VII; King George V; King George VI; Sir Winston Churchill; Admiral of the Fleet The 1st Earl Mountbatten of Burma; and Queen Elizabeth II. It is traditionally pulled by members of the Royal Navy; when not in use, it is kept at the shore establishment HMS Excellent. A smaller version, known as the Portsmouth Gun Carriage, has been used at the ceremonial funerals of several senior naval officers in the 20th century.

== Manufacture ==
The gun carriage is from a British Army Ordnance, BL, 12 pdr 6 cwt, MK II, gun and weighs 2.5 tonnes (2.8 tons).

The carriage was made by Vickers, Sons and Maxim in 1896 and entered storage at the Royal Arsenal, Woolwich, being recorded as No. 146. The carriage never saw active service, probably being retained as part of a reserve. Queen Victoria had seen a gun carriage used during the funeral of her son, the Duke of Albany, and requested the same for her funeral.

In 1899, No. 146 was handed to the Royal Carriage Department for conversion for use in state funerals. A catafalque and rubber tyres were added but other fittings and fixtures were left unchanged.

== Victoria's funeral ==
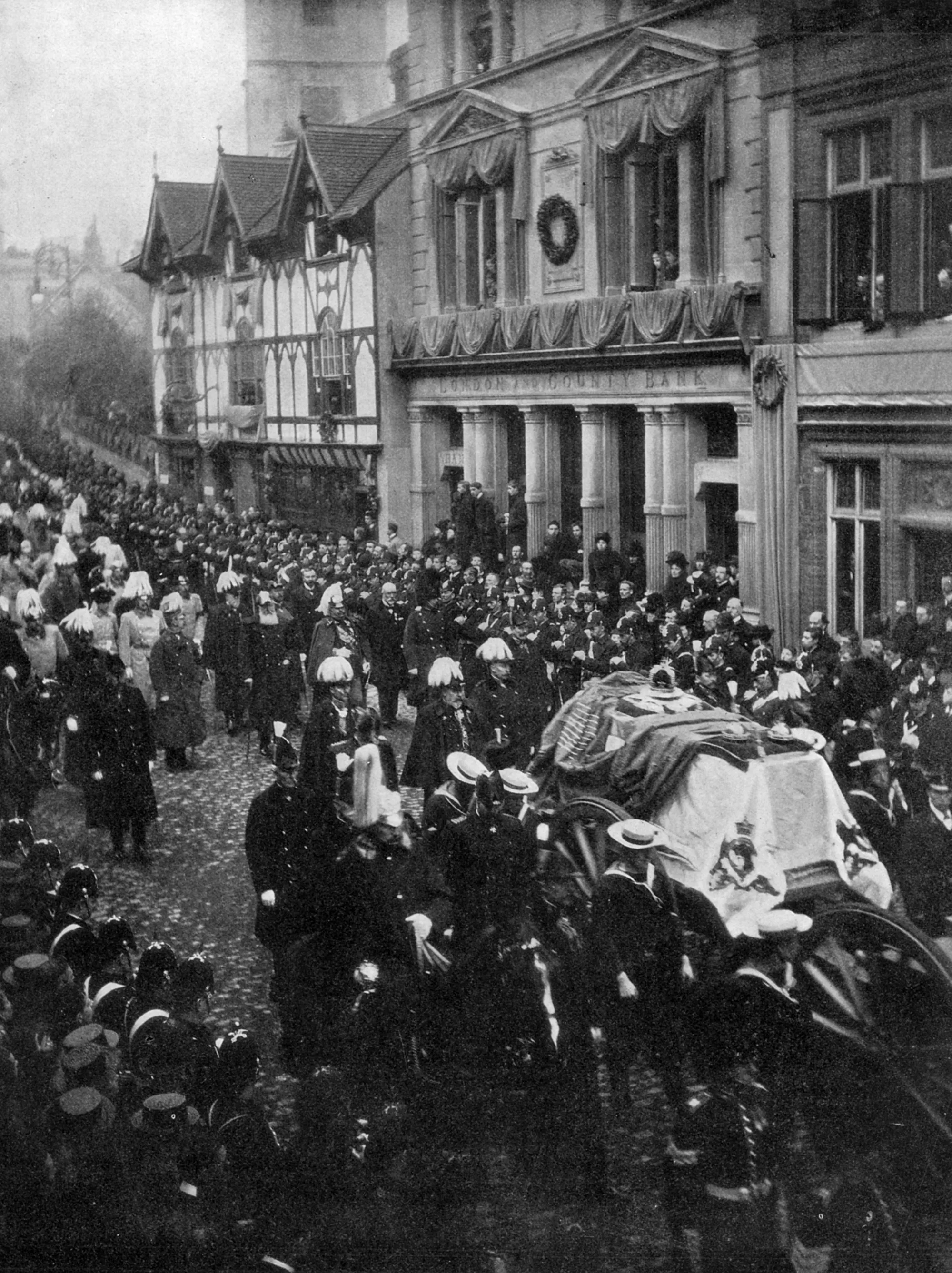
Victoria's coffin on the state gun carriage being drawn through the streets of Windsor

The carriage was used during the state funeral of Queen Victoria in 1901. In the days after Victoria's death the carriage was issued to the X Battery of the Royal Horse Artillery (RHA). It was to carry the Queen's coffin from Windsor railway station to Windsor Castle, where it would be interred in the adjacent Royal Mausoleum at Frogmore on 2 February.

According to the Naval Historical Society of Australia there are two accounts of the events that followed. According to a naval observer, Lieutenant Percy Noble, the RHA's horses had not been exercised while awaiting the Royal Train's arrival and were unhappy when the coffin was placed on the carriage. They are said to have reared up and threatened to topple the coffin. Noble stated that Prince Louis of Battenberg asked the Royal Navy party commander, Lieutenant Algernon Boyle, for his sailors to pull the carriage.

The army officer in charge of X Battery at the funeral, Lieutenant M.L. Goldie, stated instead that an eye hole on the carriage splinter bar broke when his horses moved off. Confusion followed as various officers and officials attempted to exert control over the situation that prevented him from carrying out immediate repairs.

The end result was that sailors of the Royal Navy pulled the carriage to Windsor Castle, with a team of sailors using improvised drag ropes, made up from the horse harnesses and the communication cord taken from the royal train. This started a tradition that has been upheld at all subsequent state funerals.

== Later history ==
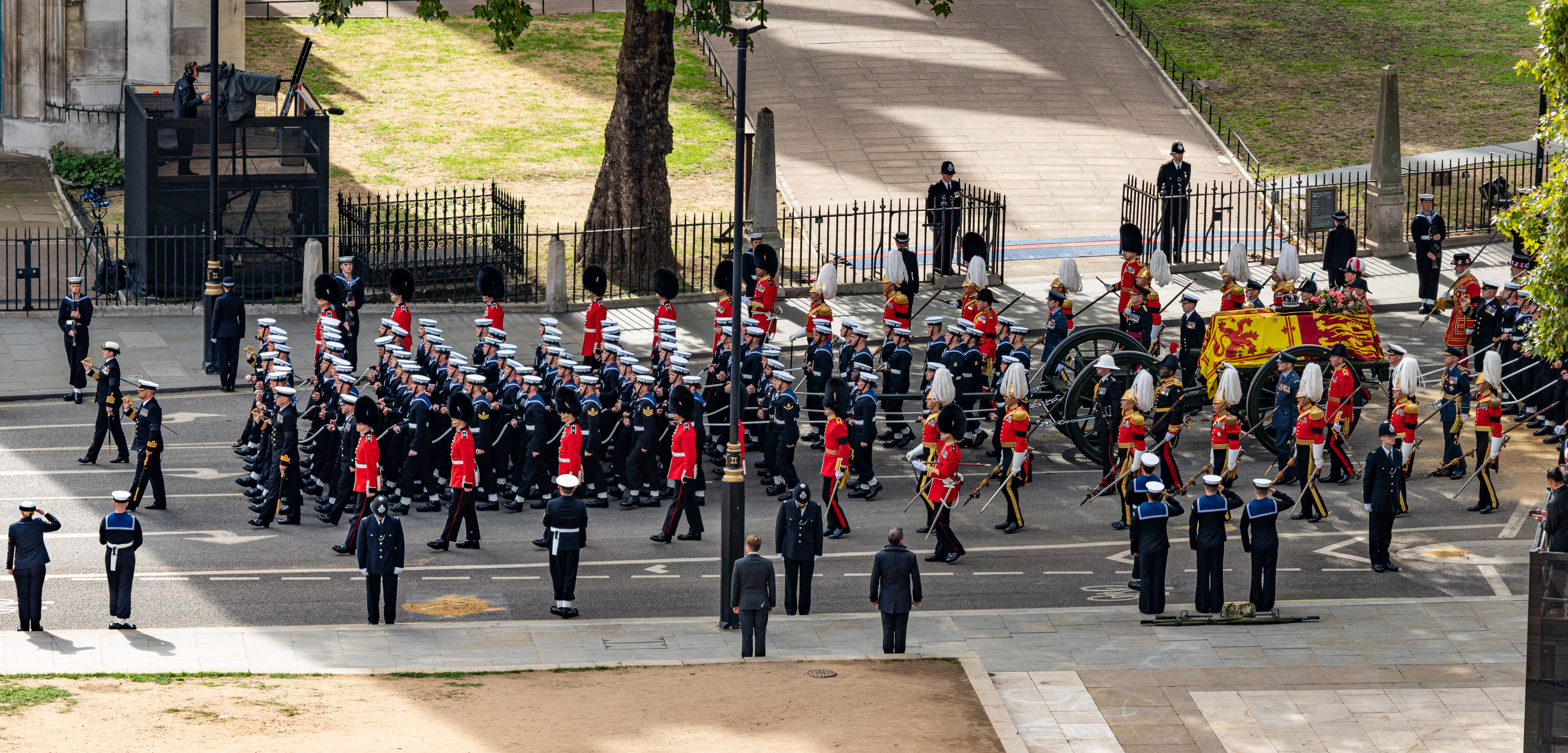
Royal Navy State Funeral Gun Carriage in 2022, pulled by 138 Royal Navy sailors during the funeral procession of Elizabeth II

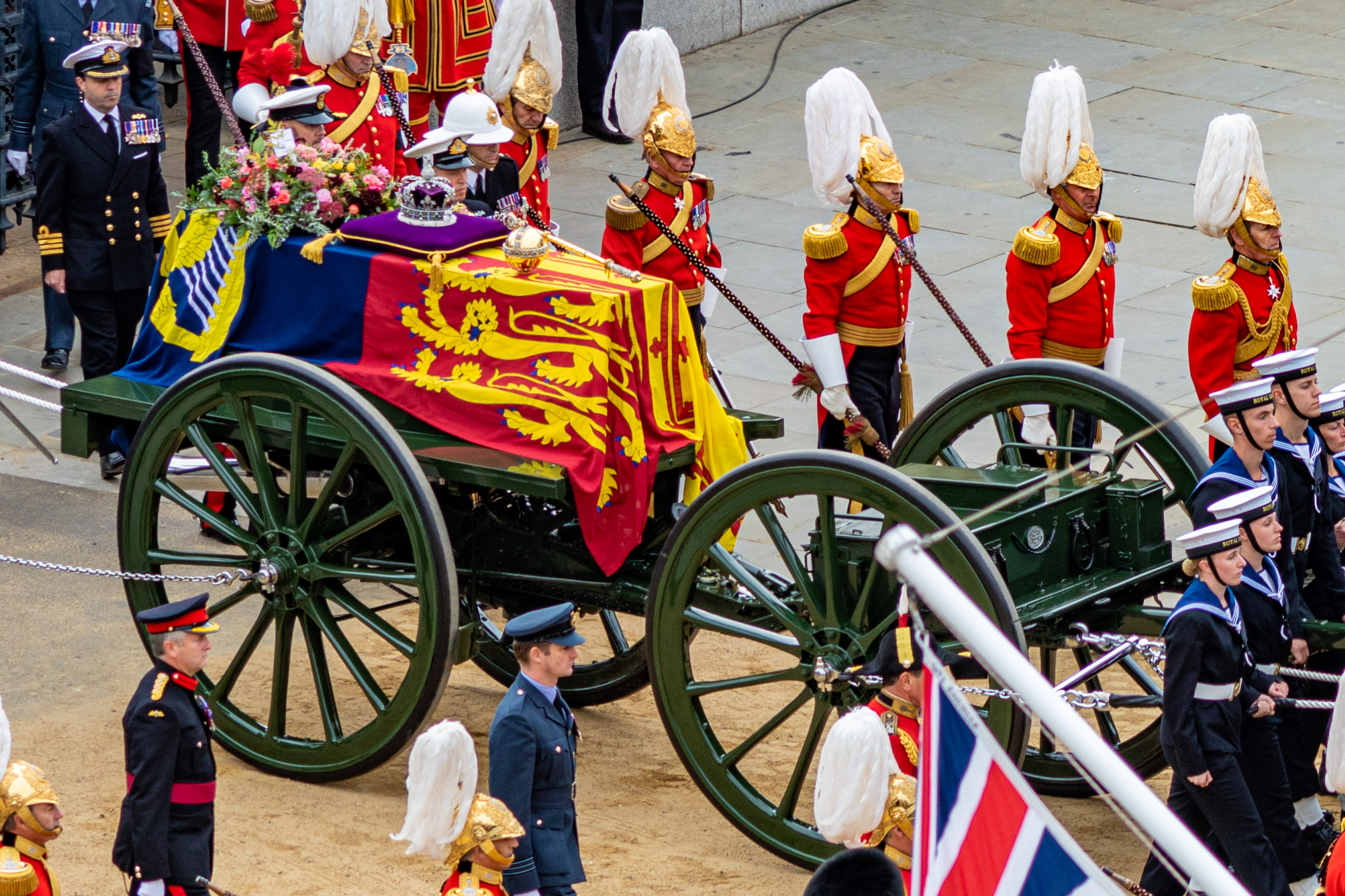
Closeup of the Royal Navy State Funeral Gun Carriage at Elizabeth II's state funeral

After Victoria's funeral, the Royal Navy retained the carriage; they may have refused to return it to the army. The navy was formally given the carriage by George V in 1910. The carriage has since been used at the funerals of Edward VII, George V, George VI, Sir Winston Churchill, Lord Mountbatten, and Elizabeth II. It is stored at the shore establishment HMS Excellent, near Portsmouth. The staff instructors' mess displays the ropes used at the funeral of Edward VII. In storage the carriage is moved slightly every seven days, to allow its wheels to turn by a quarter to prevent them from being deformed. The carriage, including its gun barrel, are regularly polished. The carriage is held at 24-hours readiness for service in a facility kept at a constant temperature of 16–20 °C (61–68 °F) and between 40 and 70% humidity to hinder fungal growth.

Most recently, the gun carriage made its first appearance in 43 years for the funeral procession from Westminster Hall to Westminster Abbey for the state funeral of Queen Elizabeth II on 19 September 2022. It was transported by 138 naval ratings, with 98 pulling, in front of the carriage, and 40 behind, braking, with 4 officers walking alongside the 40 brakers, 4 officers walking alongside the pullers, and 2 further officers leading the 138. After the service at the abbey the carriage was used again, attended by 137 naval ratings (one having fallen ill), to carry the coffin to Constitution Hill where it was transferred to the state hearse for its journey from Wellington Arch to St George's Chapel at Windsor Castle for interment. This occasion marked the first time in history that women of the Royal Navy were part of the gun carriage crew.

== Uses ==
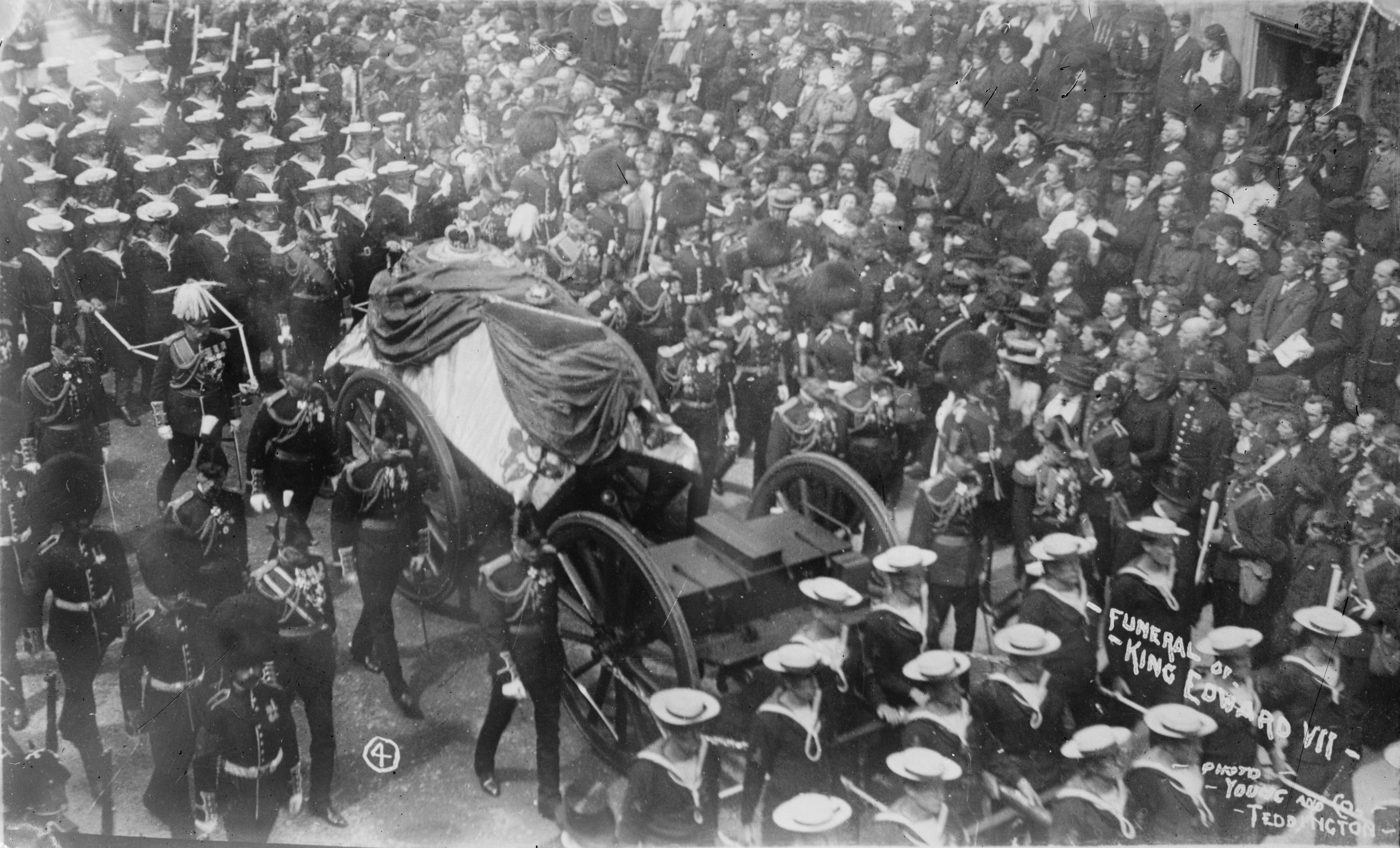
The Gun Carriage at the funeral of King Edward VII in 1910.

Date	Funeral
2 February 1901	State funeral of Queen Victoria
20 May 1910	State funeral of King Edward VII
28 January 1936	State funeral of King George V
15 February 1952	State funeral of King George VI
30 January 1965	State funeral of Sir Winston Churchill
5 September 1979	Ceremonial funeral of the Earl Mountbatten of Burma
19 September 2022	State funeral of Queen Elizabeth II

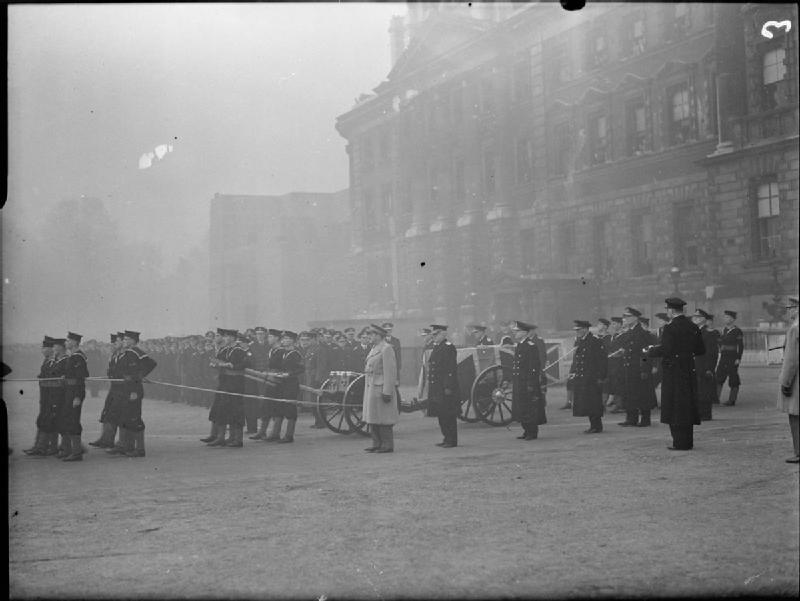
The Portsmouth Gun Carriage at the funeral of Sir Dudley Pound in 1943

== Portsmouth Gun Carriage ==
A smaller gun carriage, called the Portsmouth Gun Carriage, is stored at HMS Collingwood, a shore establishment at Fareham in Hampshire, and has been used for eight ceremonial funerals of senior naval officers between 1935 and 1967. These include Earl Jellicoe, Earl Beatty, Sir Dudley Pound, and Viscount Cunningham. A plaque on the carriage records that it originally came from HMS Pembroke in Chatham, Kent, and was first used for the funeral of Sir Charles Madden at Westminster Abbey on 7 June 1935. It is a QF 12-pounder 8 cwt gun carriage, usually pulled by a team of 18 ratings.

== Gallery ==
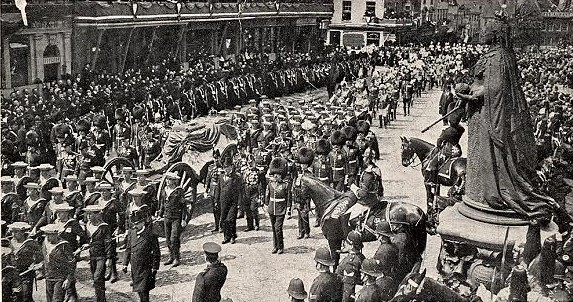
Royal Navy State Funeral Gun Carriage at funeral of Edward VII, 1910

Funeral procession of Edward VII, London, 1910 (see 2:30 mins)

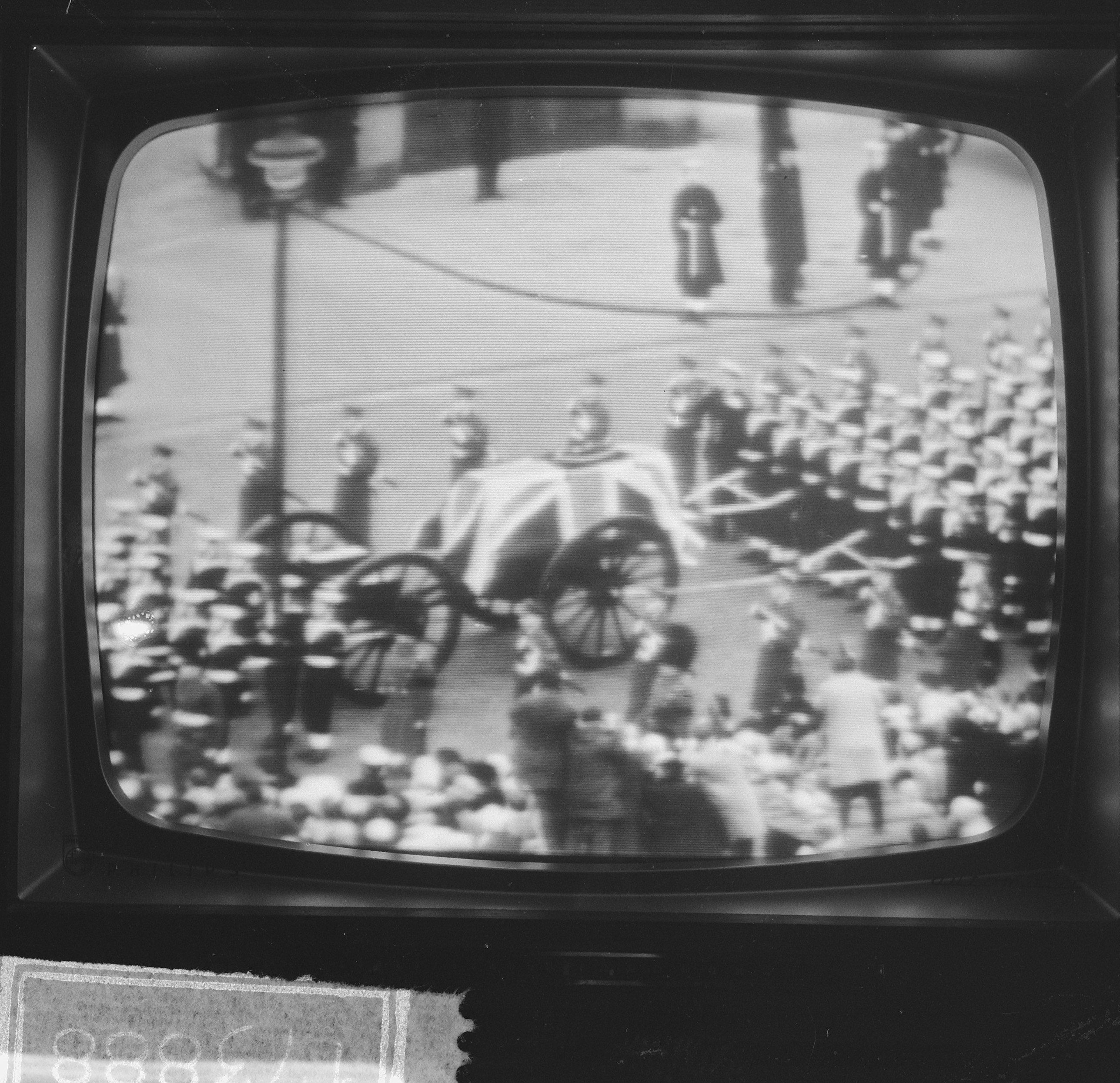
Royal Navy State Funeral Gun Carriage at Churchill's funeral, January 1965

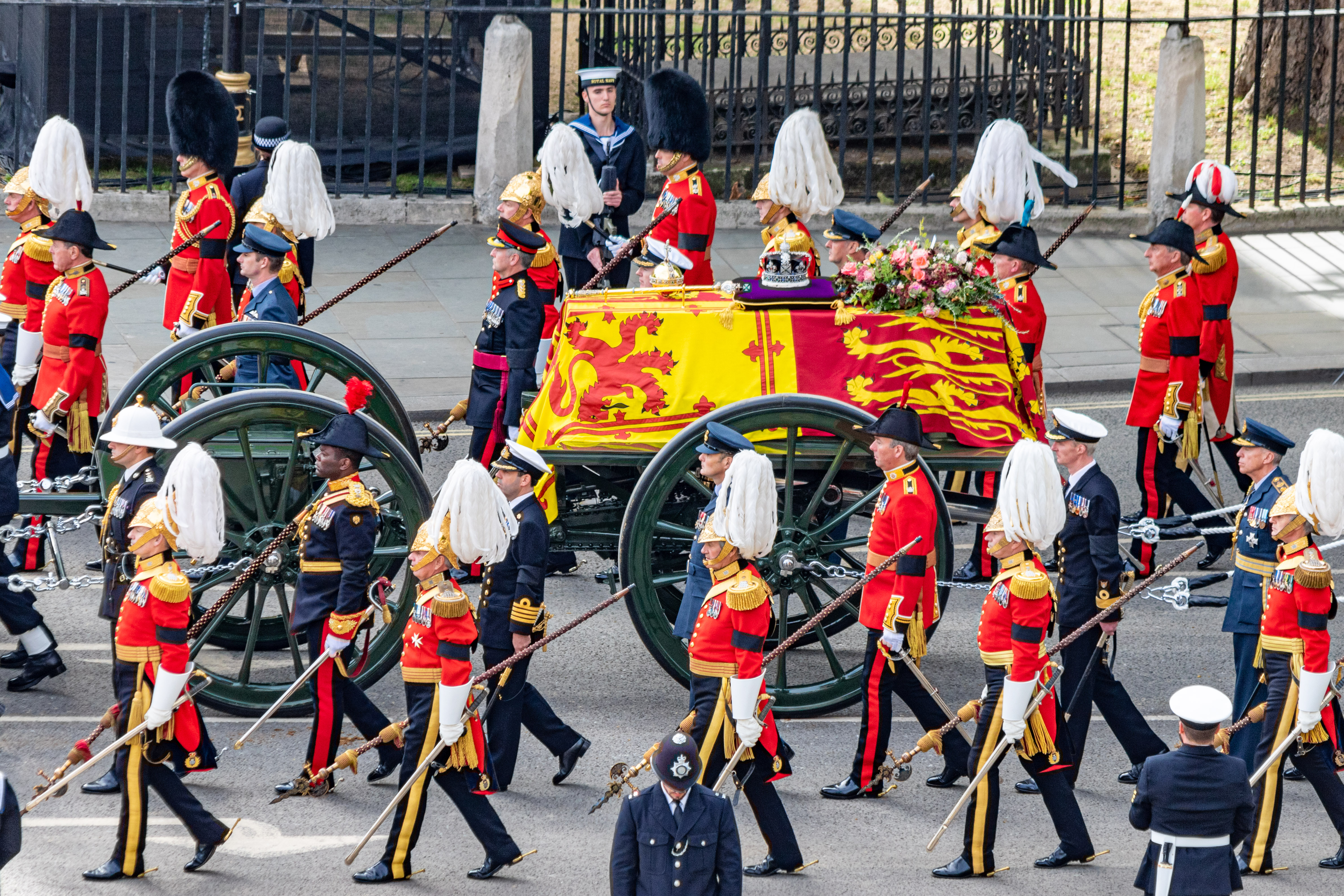
The gun carriage in 2022 at Elizabeth II's funeral

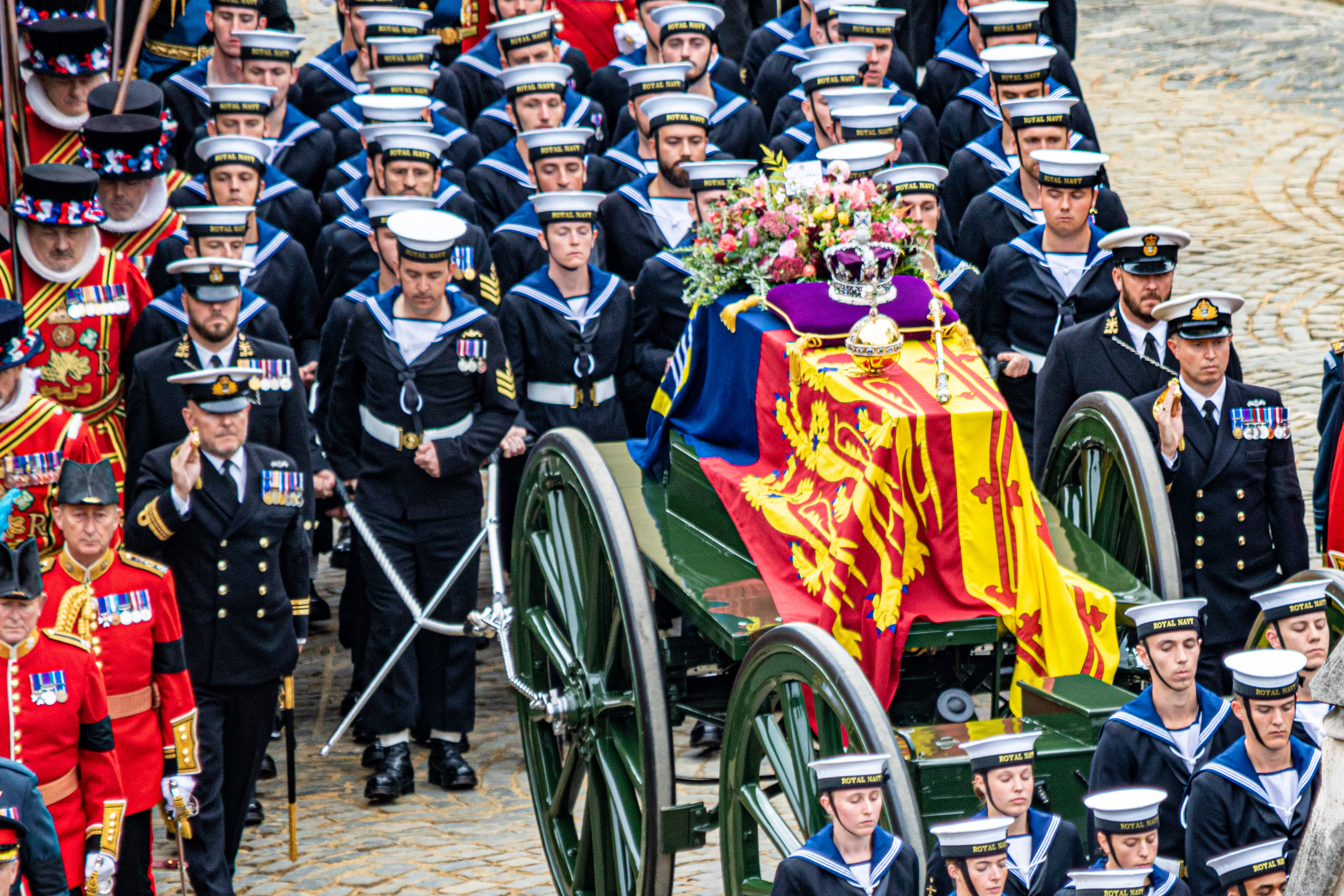

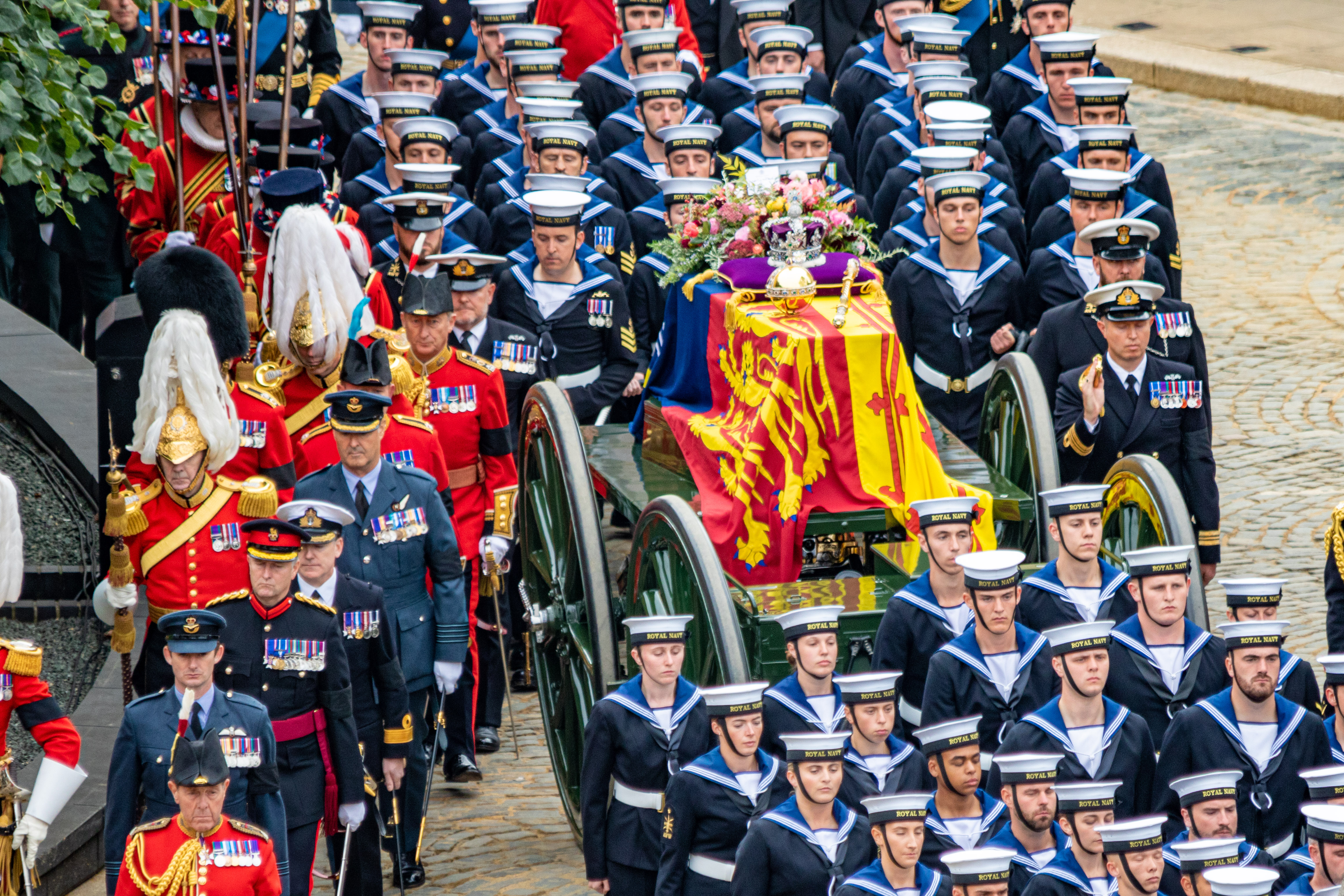
