= R v Smith (1900) =

Court case decided in the Colony of the Cape of Good Hope

Regina v Smith
- Decided: 30 October 1900
- Citation: (1900) 17 SC 561; (1900) 10 CTR 773

Court membership
- Judges sitting: Solomon J, Lange J, Maasdorp QC

R v Smith is a case decided by the Special Court created by the Indemnity and Special Tribunals Act, 1900 (No 6), sitting in the buildings of the Supreme Court of the Colony of the Cape of Good Hope. It relates to whether superior orders are an excuse or justification. It has been called a leading case.

According to the Cape Times Law Reports, the ratio decidendi of this case is as follows: The orders of a superior officer so long as they are neither obviously and decidedly illegal nor opposed to the well-established customs of the Army, must be completely and unhesitatingly obeyed by a soldier subordinate to such officer. But if such commands are obviously illegal, the inferior will be justified in questioning or even refusing to execute them. An officer or soldier acting under orders from his superior which are not necessarily nor manifestly illegal, will be justified in obeying such orders.

== Facts ==
During the Second Boer War, on 22 November 1899, Peter William Smith, a member of the Cape Police Force and part of a patrol of British troops under the direct command of Captain Chas F Cox, shot and killed John Dolley, a native servant, at Jackhalsfontein, Colesberg, then in Cape Colony, for failing to produce a missing bridle, in obedience to the order "If he does not look sharp, put a hole through him" given by Cox. Smith was charged with the murder of Dolley.

== Judgment ==
Stephen said that in delivering judgment the Court, which was performing the duties of a jury as well as those of judges, found as a fact that Captain Cox believed that Dolley knew where the bridle was when he was told to fetch it, and that he willfully refused to do so; otherwise, there was no disputed question of fact of any importance for them to decide.

The Court in announcing the law on which they acted left on one side the questions whether Captain Cox's order was in fact lawful and whether if it were not his acts and those of Smith were covered by the Act of Indemnity: and held that even if Captain Cox's order was unlawful, Smith was bound to obey it if it was not obviously and decidedly in opposition to the law of the land, or to the well-known established customs of the army. The rule was that if a soldier honestly believed he was doing his duty in obeying the commands of his superior and if the orders were not so manifestly illegal that he must or ought to have known that they were unlawful, the private soldier was protected by the order of his superior officer. Smith was accordingly acquitted.

== Novelty ==
This case was the first to be heard before the Special Court.

It was reserved for the Court to give the first authoritative judgment on what had previously been a moot point, namely, what according to civil, as opposed to military, law is the position of a soldier who commits homicide at the order of his superior officer?

In 1901, Stephen said:

It is probable that had the case been tried in England the question of law would have been decided precisely as it was by Mr. Justice Solomon and his colleagues. Case law is practically silent on the point, and the only statutory provision on the subject seems to be sect 9. of the Army Act, by which 'any person subject to military law' who 'disobeys any lawful command given by his superior officer' is liable in some cases to death, in others to penal servitude. The matter has not, however, escaped attention, and the judgement of the Court is in fact delivered in the terms of the Manual of Military Law, ch. iii, par. 11, which is in accordance with the view suggested by Sir James Stephen in his History of the Criminal Law, vol. i. p. 205. The point is not dealt with by the Draft Code of the Commission of 1878; but sect. 50 of that Code applies a similar rule to the acts of a soldier in suppressing a riot, when he is justified in obeying the command of his superior officer, unless such order is manifestly illegal. The report of Lord Bowen's Committee on the Featherstone riots hardly touches the liability of the private soldier, being chiefly occupied with the duty of the officer, and being in any case confined to the case of a riot.

The South African Court . . . thus had a pretty free hand in the matter . . .

== Subsequent judicial history ==
This case was followed in R v Celliers. It was not followed in R v Van Vuuren. It was held not to apply to the order in R v Werner.

== Reports ==
This case was reported in the Supreme Court Reports and the Cape Times Law Reports. In 1901, Stephen said that the report in the Cape Times was the best report yet to hand and he hoped a proper report of the case might be produced in some form easily accessible to the English practitioner.

== Bail ==
Regina v Smith
- Decided: 23 August 1900
- Citation: (1900) 10 CTR 486

Court membership
- Judges sitting: Buchanan ACJ, Maasdorp J, Solomon J

Keywords
- Murder; Bail

The Supreme Court of the Cape of Good Hope refused Smith's application for bail.
