= Ordnance BL 12-pounder 7 cwt =

British field gun

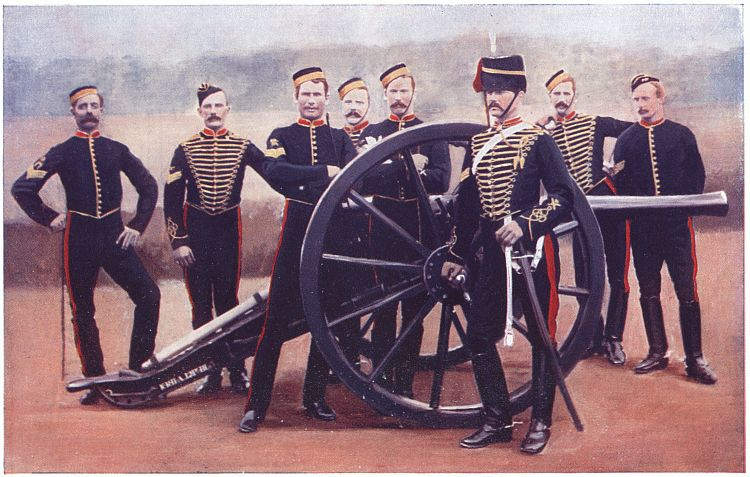
- With Royal Horse Artillery crew
- Type: Field gun
- Place of origin: United Kingdom

Service history
- In service: 1885–1895
- Used by: British Empire

Production history
- Designed: 1883

Specifications
- Mass: 784 pounds (356 kg) barrel & breech
- Barrel length: 84 inches (2,134 mm) bore (28 calibres)
- Shell: separate loading BL, 12.5 lb (5.7 kg) Shrapnel
- Calibre: 3-inch (76.2 mm)
- Traverse: nil
- Muzzle velocity: 1,710 feet per second (520 m/s)
- Maximum firing range: 5,000 yards (4,600 m)

The Ordnance BL 12-pounder 7cwt (Note: British military traditionally denoted smaller ordnance by the weight of its standard projectile, in this case approximately 12 pounds (5.4 kg). "7 cwt" referred to the weight of the gun and barrel to differentiate it from other "12-pounder" guns. 1 long hundredweight (cwt) = 112 pounds (51 kg).) was the British Army's field gun which succeeded the RML 13-pounder 8 cwt in 1885.

== History ==
The gun was initially adopted by both the Royal Field Artillery and Royal Horse Artillery, and was in full service by 1885. It marked a return to breech-loading guns, after the British Army had reverted to muzzle-loaders in the late 1860s following the failure of the Armstrong screw breech guns.

Problems arose when it was used by the Horse Artillery in the great Indian cavalry manoeuvres of 1891. The carriage was found to be too complicated and dust caused the metal surfaces of the axle traversing device to seize. It also proved too heavy to manoeuvre for horse artillery, which was intended to support cavalry in battle.

The 12-pounder 6 cwt gun was thus developed in 1892, when the new more powerful cordite replaced gunpowder, as a lighter alternative. It had a barrel 18 inches (460 mm) shorter, on a lighter and simpler carriage, and it entered service with the Royal Horse Artillery in 1894.

The introduction of Cordite also led to the decision that the 12-pounder was capable of firing a heavier shell up to 15 lb (6.8 kg). A 14-pound shell was adopted and the gun became a "15-pounder" from 1895. At that point the 12-pounder 7 cwt became redundant.

== Combat use ==
The gun was normally towed by 6 horses, in 3 pairs.

== See also ==
- Field artillery
- List of field guns

== Surviving examples ==
- Hobbs Artillery Park, Irwin Barracks, Karrakatta, Western Australia

== Bibliography ==
- Text Book of Gunnery, 1902. LONDON : PRINTED FOR HIS MAJESTY'S STATIONERY OFFICE, BY HARRISON AND SONS, ST. MARTIN'S LANE
- Dale Clarke, British Artillery 1914–1919. Field Army Artillery. Osprey Publishing, Oxford UK, 2004
- Major Darrell D. Hall, "Field Artillery of the British Army 1860–1960. Part I, 1860 – 1900" in The South African Military History Society. Military History Journal – Vol 2 No 4, December 1972
