= Andries Maasdorp =

The Honourable Sir Andries Maasdorp KC

Judge President of the Orange Free State Provincial Division of the Supreme Court of South Africa
- In office 1910–1919
- Preceded by: New position

Chief Justice of the Orange River Colony
- In office 1902–1910
- Preceded by: Melius de Villiers
- Succeeded by: position replaced by Chief Justice of South Africa

Personal details
- Born: Andries Ferdinand Stockenström Maasdorp; 14 January 1847 Malmesbury, Cape Colony
- Died: 18 March 1931 (aged 84) Rondebosch, Cape Province, Union of South Africa
- Relations: Christian Maasdorp (brother)
- Education: University College London

Sir Andries Ferdinand Stockenström Maasdorp, KC (14 January 1847 – 18 March 1931) was chief justice of the Orange River Colony. He was knighted in 1904 as a Knight Bachelor.

== Early life and education ==
Maasdorp was the second of the five sons of Gysbert Henry Maasdorp and his wife, Anna Maria Hartzenberg. His eldest brother, also Gysbert Henry Maasdorp, was member of the Cape legislative assembly for Graaff-Reinet and the third brother was Justice Christian Maasdorp. Maasdorp was educated at the grammar school at Graaff Reinet. In 1865, he was awarded a gold medal by the Cape board of examiners, for coming first in mathematics and classics in their examination. He subsequently studied at Graaff- Reinet College and at University College London, where he obtained a BA in 1869.

== Career ==
In 1871, he was admitted to the Inner Temple as barrister, and from March 1872, practised at the Cape bar. In 1890, he became a Queen's Counsel, then a King's Counsel upon the death of Queen Victoria in January 1901. In the late 1890s, he moved to Pretoria and practised at the Pretoria bar from 1897 until 1899. When a dispute arose between President Paul Kruger and Chief Justice John Gilbert Kotzé, Maasdorp sided with Kotzé. With the outbreak of the Second Anglo-Boer War, he returned to the Cape Colony and once again practised at Grahamstown.

In 1902, he became Chief Justice of the Orange River Colony and after South Africa became a Union, he became the Judge President of the Orange Free State Provincial Division of the Supreme Court of South Africa. He was knighted in 1904 and retired from the bench at the end of 1919.

== Personal life ==
Maasdorp married Agnes Catherine Thomson Hayton in 1880 and they had three sons and two daughters.
