= Christian Maasdorp =

South African jurist

The Honourable Christian Maasdorp
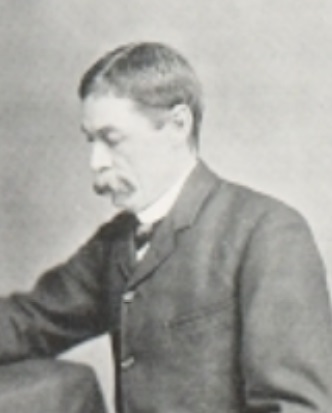

Judge of the Appellate Division of South Africa
- In office 1915–1922

Judge President of the Cape Provincial Division
- In office 1910–1914
- Preceded by: New position
- Succeeded by: Sir Henry Juta

Judge of the Cape Supreme Court
- In office 1896–1910

Judge of the Supreme Court of the Eastern Districts
- In office 1885–1895

Attorney General of the Transvaal Colony
- In office 1877–1880

Personal details
- Born: Christian George Maasdorp; 11 June 1848 Malmesbury, Cape Colony
- Died: 21 May 1926 (aged 77) Grahamstown, Union of South Africa
- Relations: Sir Andries Maasdorp (brother)

Christian George Maasdorp (11 June 1848 – 21 May 1926) was a South African jurist and Judge of Appeal.

== Early life and education ==
Maasdorp was the son of Gysbert Henry Maasdorp, a medical doctor, and his wife, Anna Maria Hartzenberg and the younger brother of Justice Andries Maasdorp. He received his basic education at Graaff-Reinet and obtained both the Second-Class and First-Class Certificates in Literature and Science of the Council of Examiners, later to be known as the University of the Cape of Good Hope. He then continued his studies in London, where he obtained the BA degree in 1869. Thereafter he became a member of the Inner Temple, where he was a fellow student of John Gilbert Kotzé.

== Career ==
Maasdorp was admitted as a barrister in June 1871 and then returned to South Africa and was admitted to the Cape Bar on 3 August 1871. He then practised at the Supreme Court of Griqualand West at Barkly West and thereafter, for three years, at the Supreme Court of the Eastern Districts in Grahamstown. In October 1877 he was appointed as Attorney General of the Transvaal and in February 1880 he resigned and returned to Cape Town to resume his practice in the Cape.

Maasdorp then had several appointments as judge. In 1885 he was appointed Judge of the Supreme Court of the Eastern Districts and in 1896 he became Judge of the Cape Supreme Court. After South Africa became a Union in 1910, Maasdorp was appointed Judge President of the Cape Provincial Division of the Supreme Court, as well as Additional Judge of Appeal. In 1915 he became Judge of Appeal.

== Personal life ==
Maasdorp was married to Ella Elizabeth Hutton and had six children. Two of his sons were killed in action during the First World War. He retired in 1922 and died in Grahamstown on 21 May 1926.
