= Death and state funeral of Queen Victoria =

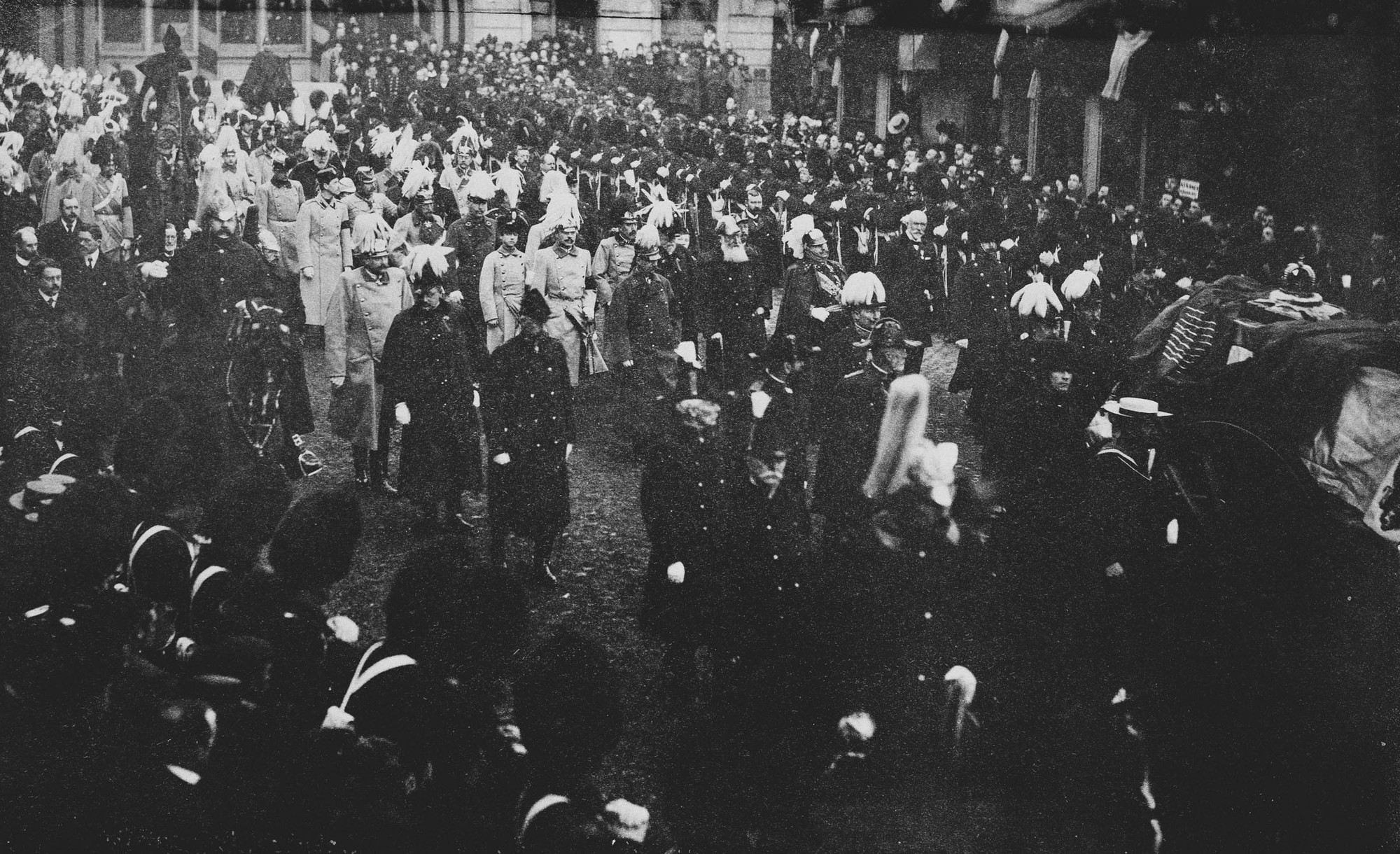
- Queen Victoria's funeral procession
- Date: 22 January 1901; (death); 2 February 1901; (state funeral)
- Location: Osborne House; (place of death); St George's Chapel, Windsor Castle; (official ceremony)
- Participants: British royal family and members of various other royal houses
- Burial: 4 February 1901; Frogmore Mausoleum, Windsor Great Park

Victoria, Queen of the United Kingdom of Great Britain and Ireland and Empress of India, died on 22 January 1901 at Osborne House on the Isle of Wight, at the age of 81 years old. At the time of her death, she was the longest-reigning monarch in British history. Her state funeral took place on 2 February 1901. It was one of the biggest gatherings of European royalty.

== Description ==
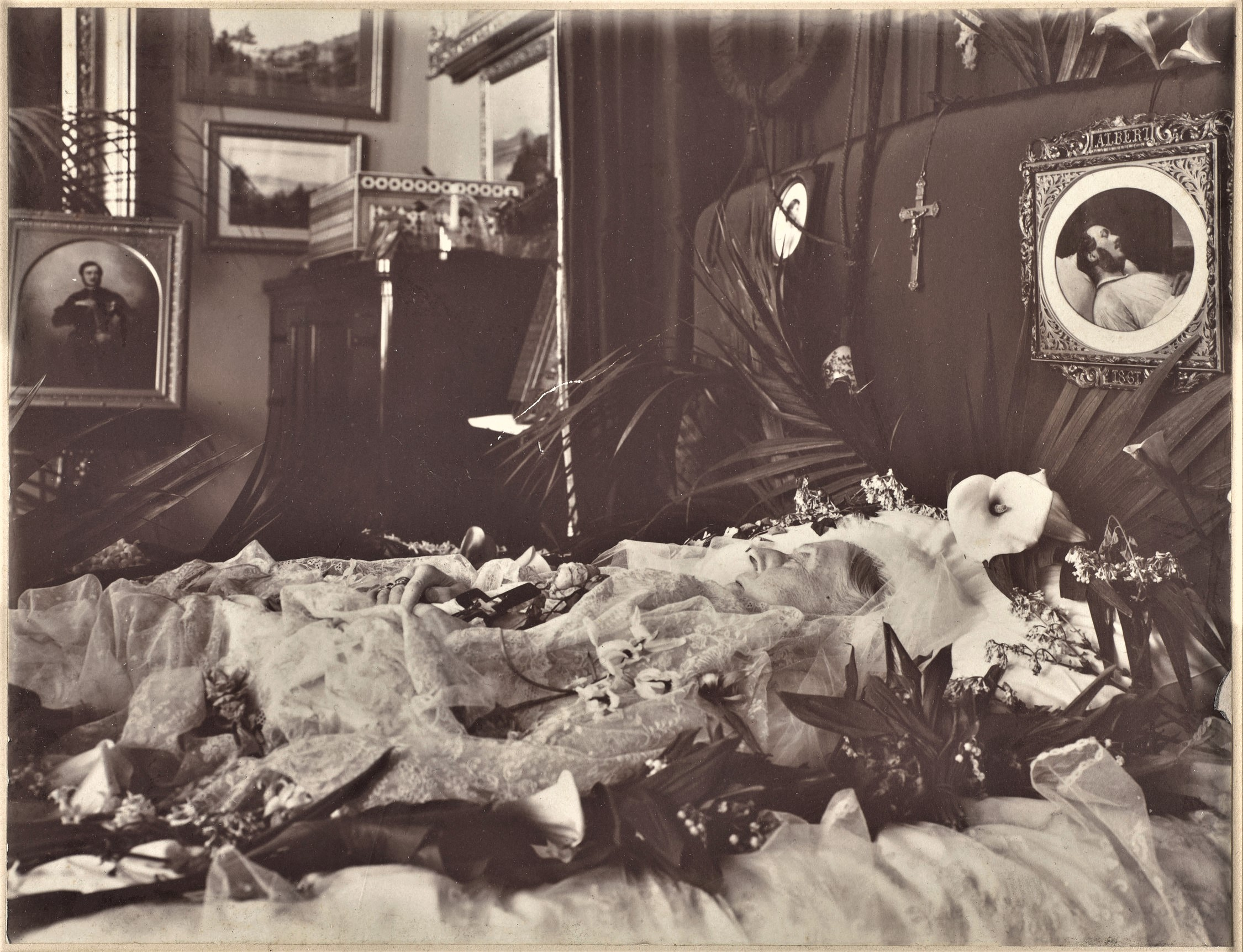
Queen Victoria on her deathbed in 1901

Following a custom she maintained throughout her widowhood, Victoria spent the Christmas of 1900 at Osborne House on the Isle of Wight. Rheumatism in her legs had rendered her disabled, and her eyesight was clouded by cataracts. Through early January, she felt "weak and unwell", and by mid-January she was "drowsy [...] dazed, [and] confused". Her favourite pet Pomeranian, Turi, was laid on her bed as a last request. Victoria died at 6:30 pm on 22 January 1901, aged 81, in the presence of her eldest son, Albert Edward, and grandson, Wilhelm II. Albert Edward succeeded immediately as Edward VII.

On 25 January, her body was lifted into the coffin by her sons Edward VII and Prince Arthur, Duke of Connaught, and her grandson the German Emperor Wilhelm II. She was dressed in a white dress and her wedding veil. An array of mementos commemorating her extended family, friends and servants were laid in the coffin with her, at her request, by her doctor and dressers. A dressing gown that had belonged to her husband Albert, who had died 40 years earlier, was placed by her side, along with a plaster cast of his hand, while a lock of John Brown's hair, along with a picture of him, was placed in her left hand concealed from the view of the family by a carefully positioned bunch of flowers. Items of jewellery placed on Victoria included the wedding ring of John Brown's mother, given to her by Brown in 1883.

=== State funeral ===
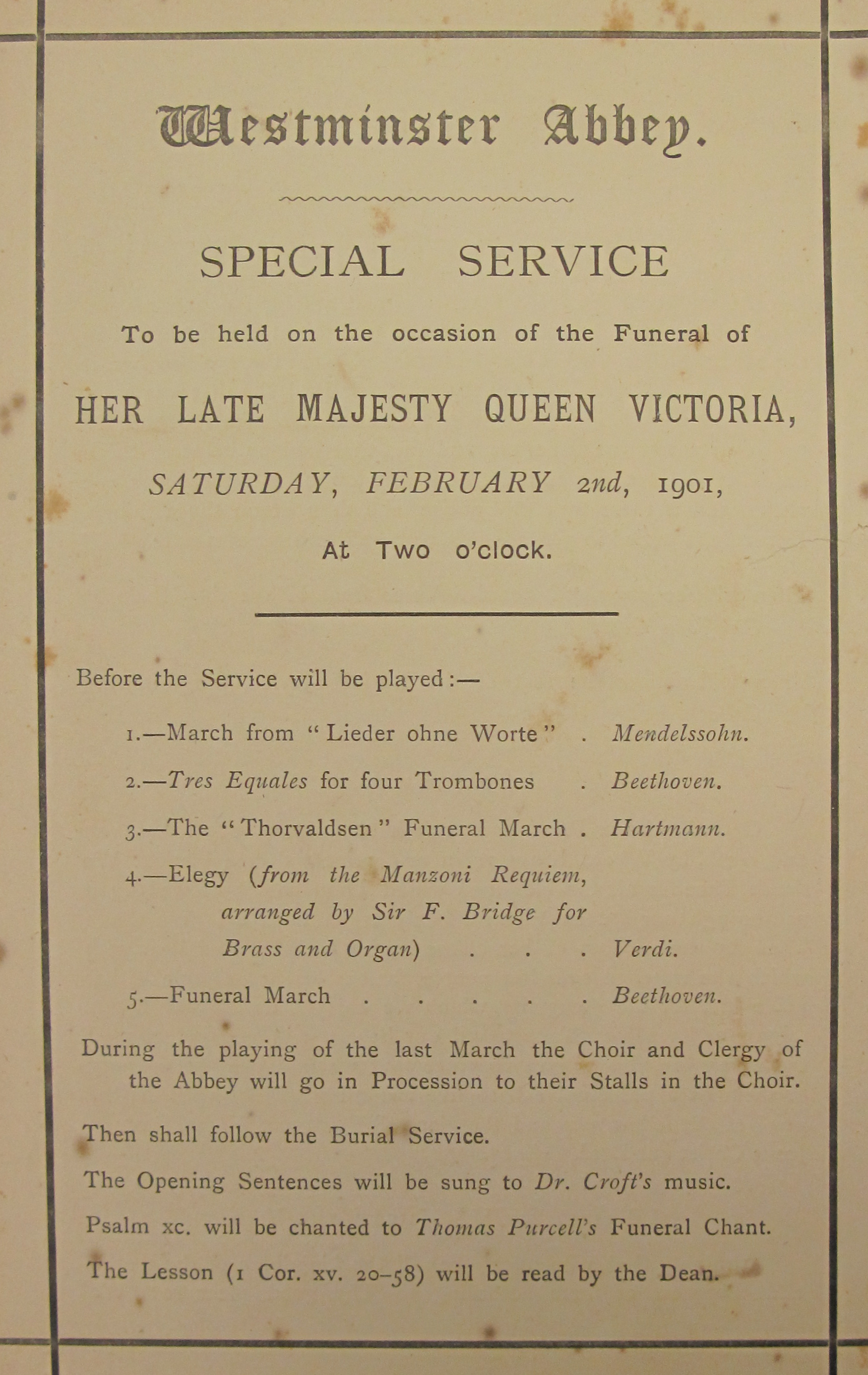
Memorial services were held at churches across the country to coincide with the state funeral; this is the order paper for a "Special Service" at Westminster Abbey.

The state funeral of Queen Victoria took place on Saturday, 2 February 1901, in St George's Chapel, Windsor Castle; it had been 64 years since the last burial of a monarch.

In 1897, Victoria had written instructions for her funeral, which was to be military as befitting a soldier's daughter and the head of the army, and feature white dress instead of black. Victoria left strict instructions regarding the service and associated ceremonies and instituted a number of changes, several of which set a precedent for state (and indeed ceremonial) funerals that have taken place since. First, she disliked the preponderance of funereal black; henceforward, there would be no black cloaks, drapes or canopy, and Victoria requested a white pall for her coffin. Second, she expressed a desire to be buried as "a soldier's daughter". The procession, therefore, became much more a military procession, with the peers, privy counsellors and judiciary no longer taking part en masse. Her pallbearers were equerries rather than dukes (as had previously been customary), and for the first time, a gun carriage was employed to convey the monarch's coffin. Third, Victoria requested that there should be no public lying in state. This meant that the only event in London on this occasion was a gun carriage procession from one railway station to another: Victoria having died at Osborne House on the Isle of Wight, her body was conveyed by boat and train to Victoria Station, then by gun carriage to Paddington Station and then by train to Windsor for the funeral service itself.

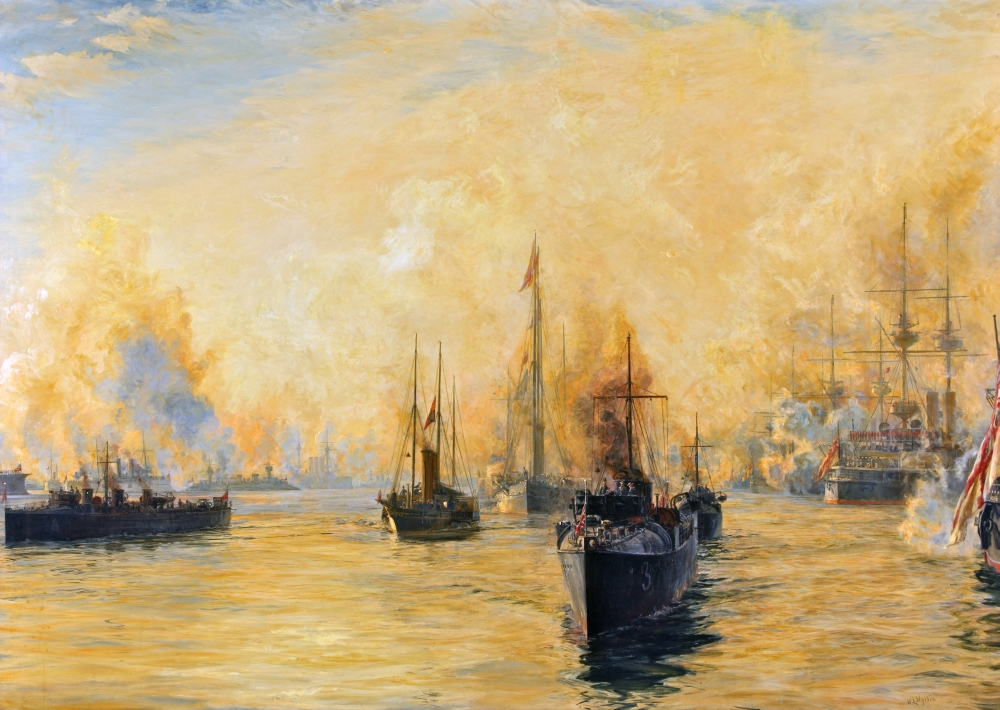
The Passing of a Great Queen; painting by William Wyllie

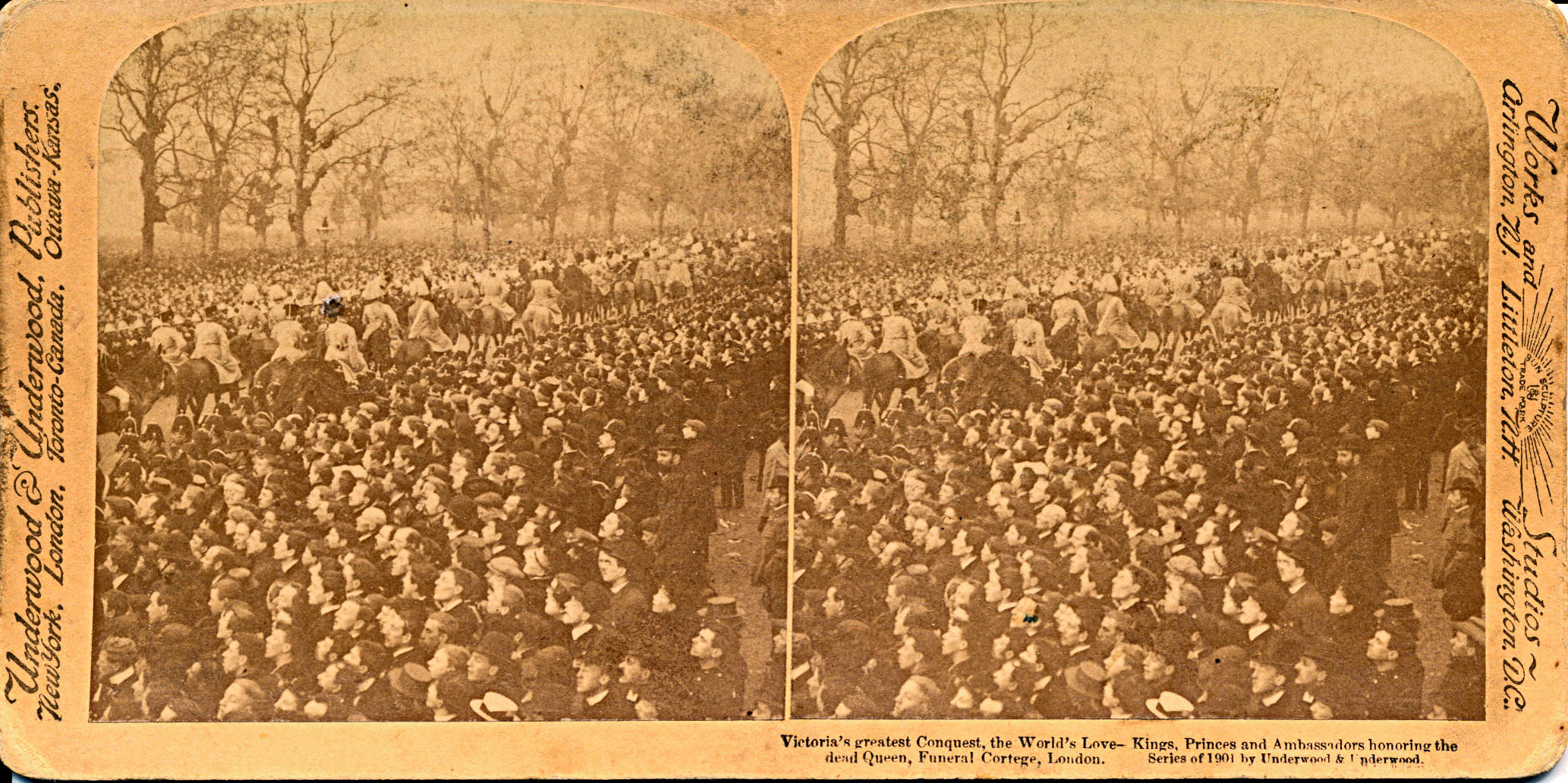
The funeral procession in London.

The rare sight of a state funeral cortège travelling by ship provided a striking spectacle: Victoria's body was carried on board HMY Alberta from Cowes to Gosport, with a suite of yachts following conveying the new king, Edward VII, and other mourners. Minute guns were fired by the assembled fleet as the yacht passed by. Victoria's body remained on board ship overnight before being conveyed by gun carriage to Gosport railway station the following day for the train journey to London. Eight bay horses of the Royal Horse Artillery were brought in from Aldershot to draw the funeral gun carriage at Osborne and at Windsor; but for the procession through London eight cream horses from the Royal Mews were used (the same eight as had drawn the late Queen's carriage at her diamond jubilee).

At Windsor, when the royal coffin was loaded on the gun carriage for the procession and the artillery horses took the weight, Princess Alice, Countess of Athlone, Victoria's granddaughter, said the day was very cold and "nothing in the world would make them start". An attendant Royal Guard from HMS Excellent was soon ordered to haul the gun carriage instead, using the horses' harness and the communication cord from the train. Using sailors to pull the gun carriage on the day of the funeral subsequently became state funeral tradition. She further observed that the Royal Artillery, responsible for the horses and the gun carriage, were "furious" and "humiliated" by the incident.

Victoria's children had married into the great royal families of Europe, and a number of foreign monarchs were in attendance, including Wilhelm II of Germany as well as the heir-presumptive to the Austro-Hungarian throne Archduke Franz Ferdinand.

==== Funeral service ====
The service, on the afternoon of Saturday 2 February at St George's Chapel, followed the liturgy of the Burial Service in the Book of Common Prayer and was the first royal funeral for which a printed order of service had been produced. The organisation of the service lay with the Dean of Windsor and the Lord Chamberlain, with the active participation of the Archbishops of Canterbury and York. The music started with the first of the funeral sentences by William Croft, and Psalm 15 to a setting by William Felton. After the lesson came further funeral sentences sung as anthems; Man that is born by Samuel Sebastian Wesley and Thou knowest Lord by Henry Purcell. The Lord's Prayer in Latin by Charles Gounod, and the anthem How blest are they by Pyotr Ilyich Tchaikovsky followed. After the Garter Principal King of Arms had proclaimed the Queen's styles and titles, the anthem Blest are the departed by Louis Spohr was reportedly followed by the Dresden amen. The inclusion of so much music by foreign composers was unprecedented, and was not repeated in later royal funerals, where British music predominated. At the end of the service, a funeral march attributed to Ludwig van Beethoven but actually by Johann Heinrich Walch was played instead of the traditional "Dead March" from Saul because Victoria was known to dislike Handel's music and was reported to have forbidden its use at her funeral.

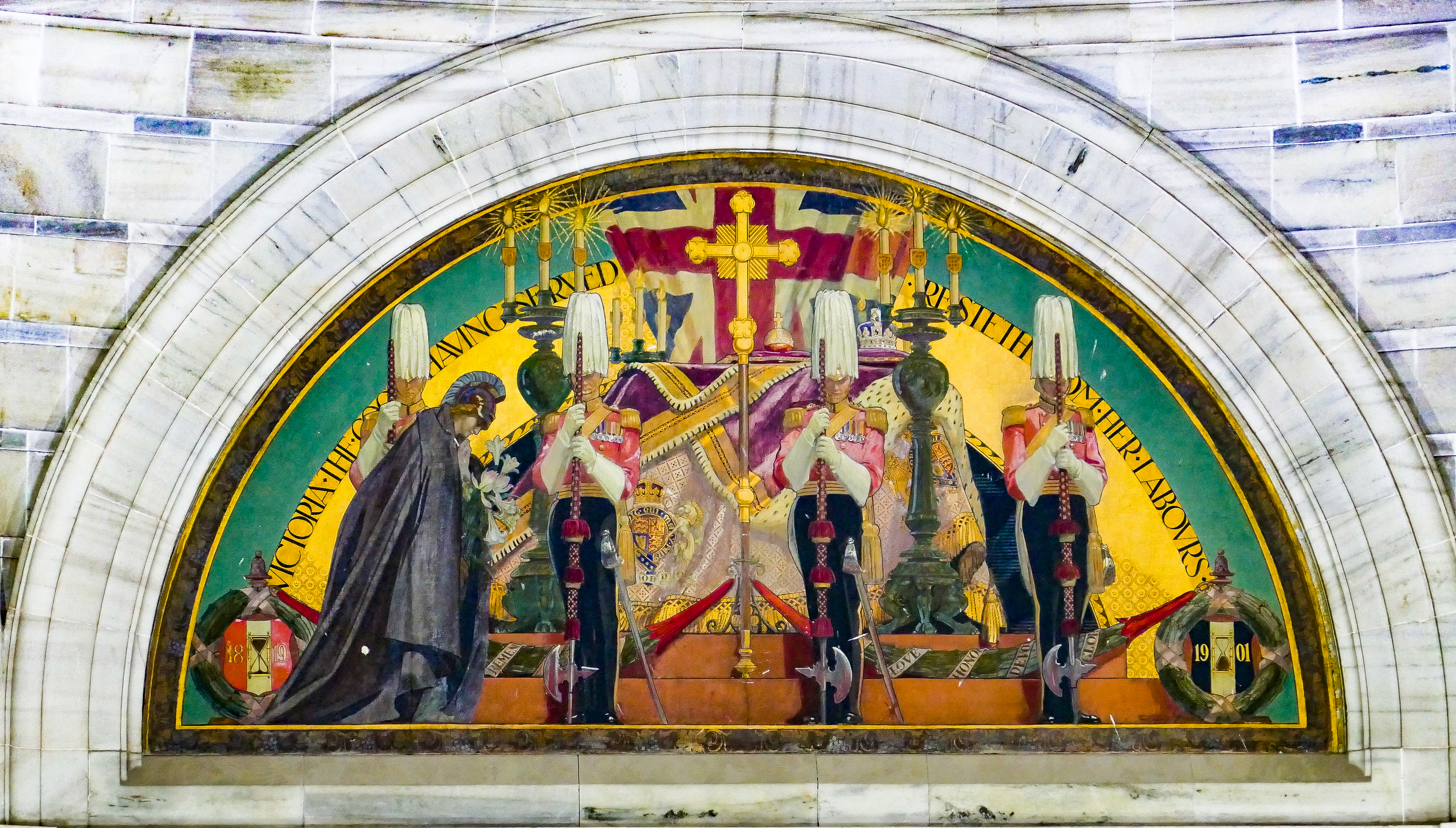
Victoria lying in state, panel from the Victoria Memorial, Kolkata

=== Lying-in-state and interment service ===
After the funeral service in St George's Chapel, Queen Victoria's body lay in state there for two days, under a military guard, before joining that of Prince Albert in the nearby Royal Mausoleum at Frogmore in Windsor Great Park.

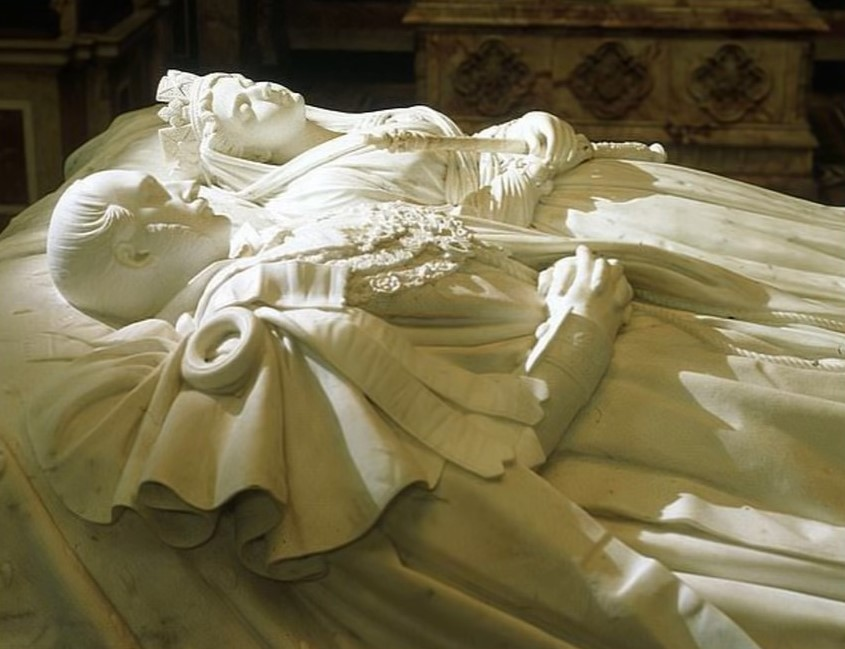
The tomb of Victoria and Albert in the Frogmore Mausoleum

The interment at the Frogmore Mausolem took place on 4 February. The procession from St George's Chapel was accompanied by massed military bands playing funeral marches, but in the final part of the journey, pipers played a lament, the Black Watch Dead March. Arriving at the mausoleum, the choir of St George's sang Yea, though I walk from Sir Arthur Sullivan's oratorio, The Light of the World. This was followed by the funeral sentences by Wesley and Purcell that had been sung at the funeral, Lord have mercy by Thomas Tallis and Gounoud's Lord's Prayer. A hymn, Sleep thy last sleep, preceded the concluding prayers read by the Dean of Windsor, after which Sullivan's anthem, The face of death and Sir John Stainer's Sevenfold Amen concluded the service.

A tomb effigy of Victoria had been sculpted by Baron Carlo Marochetti in 1861 as a companion piece to his marble effigy of Prince Albert. Victoria's sculpture was finally installed next to Albert's in the mausoleum later in 1901.

== Funeral guests ==
The list below is from a report in The London Gazette.

=== Immediate family ===
- The King and Queen of the United Kingdom, the late Queen's son and daughter-in-law
  - The Duke and Duchess of Cornwall and York, the late Queen's grandson and granddaughter-in-law
  - The Princess Louise, Duchess of Fife and the Duke of Fife, the late Queen's granddaughter and grandson-in-law
  - The Princess Victoria, the late Queen's granddaughter
  - Princess and Prince Charles of Denmark (later Haakon VII), the late Queen's granddaughter and grandson-in-law
- The Empress Frederick's family:
  - (German Empire) The German Emperor, the late Queen's grandson
    - (German Empire) The German Crown Prince, the late Queen's great-grandson
  - The Hereditary Prince of Saxe-Meiningen, the late Queen's grandson-in-law (representing the Duke of Saxe-Meiningen)
    - Prince Heinrich XXX of Reuss-Köstritz, the late Queen's great-grandson-in-law (representing the Prince Reuss Younger Line)
  - (Kingdom of Prussia) Prince Henry of Prussia, the late Queen's grandson
  - (Principality of Schaumburg-Lippe) Princess and Prince Adolf of Schaumburg-Lippe, the late Queen's granddaughter and grandson-in-law (representing the Prince of Schaumburg-Lippe)
  - (Kingdom of Greece) The Duke of Sparta, the late Queen's grandson-in-law
  - Prince Frederick Charles of Hesse, the late Queen's grandson-in-law
- Grand Duchess Alice of Hesse and by Rhine's family:
  - Princess and Prince Louis of Battenberg, the late Queen's granddaughter and grandson-in-law
  - (Grand Duchy of Hesse) The Grand Duke of Hesse and by Rhine, the late Queen's grandson
- The Duchess of Saxe-Coburg and Gotha (Duchess of Edinburgh), the late Queen's daughter-in-law
  - (Kingdom of Romania) The Crown Prince of Romania, the late Queen's grandson-in-law (representing the King of the Romanians)
  - The Hereditary Prince of Hohenlohe-Langenburg, the late Queen's grandson-in-law and half-great-nephew
  - Princess Beatrice of Saxe-Coburg and Gotha, the late Queen's granddaughter
- Princess and Prince Christian of Schleswig-Holstein, the late Queen's daughter and son-in-law
  - Prince Albert of Schleswig-Holstein, the late Queen's grandson
  - Princess Helena Victoria of Schleswig-Holstein, the late Queen's granddaughter
  - Princess Marie Louise of Schleswig-Holstein, the late Queen's granddaughter
- The Princess Louise, Duchess of Argyll and the Duke of Argyll, the late Queen's daughter and son-in-law
- The Duke and Duchess of Connaught and Strathearn, the late Queen's son and daughter-in-law
  - Princess Margaret of Connaught, the late Queen's granddaughter
  - Prince Arthur of Connaught, the late Queen's grandson
  - Princess Patricia of Connaught, the late Queen's granddaughter
- The Duchess of Albany, the late Queen's daughter-in-law
  - Princess Alice of Albany, the late Queen's granddaughter
  - The Duke of Saxe-Coburg and Gotha (Duke of Albany), the late Queen's grandson
- Princess Henry of Battenberg, the late Queen's daughter
  - Prince Alexander of Battenberg, the late Queen's grandson

Other descendants of the late Queen's paternal grandfather, King George III and their families:

- The Duke of Cambridge, the late Queen's first cousin
- The Grand Duchess of Mecklenburg-Strelitz's family:
  - (Grand Duchy of Mecklenburg-Strelitz) Duke Adolphus Frederick of Mecklenburg-Strelitz, the late Queen's first cousin twice removed (representing the Grand Duke of Mecklenburg-Strelitz)
- Princess Mary Adelaide, Duchess of Teck's family:
  - The Duke of Teck, the late Queen's first cousin once removed
  - Prince Francis of Teck, the late Queen's first cousin once removed
  - Prince Alexander of Teck, the late Queen's first cousin once removed
- Baron Alphons von Pawel-Rammingen, husband of the late Queen's first cousin once removed
- The Hon. Aubrey FitzClarence, the late Queen's double first cousin twice removed

=== Extended family ===
- The Prince of Hohenlohe-Langenburg, the late Queen's half-nephew
- Count Edward Gleichen, the late Queen's half-great-nephew
- The Duke of Schleswig-Holstein, the late Queen's half-great-nephew
- (Belgium) The King of the Belgians, the late Queen's first cousin
- Prince Philipp of Saxe-Coburg and Gotha, the late Queen's first cousin once removed
  - Prince Leopold Clement of Saxe-Coburg and Gotha, the late Queen's double first cousin twice removed
- (Kingdom of Portugal) The King of Portugal, the late Queen's first cousin twice removed
- (Kingdom of Saxony) The Duke of Saxony, the late Queen's first cousin twice removed (representing the King of Saxony)
- (Kingdom of Württemberg) Duke Robert of Württemberg, the late Queen's first cousin twice removed (representing the King of Württemberg)

=== Other foreign royalty ===
- (Kingdom of Greece) The King of the Hellenes
- The Crown Prince of Denmark (representing the King of Denmark)
- The Crown Prince of Sweden and Norway (representing the King of Sweden and Norway)
- (Austria-Hungary) Archduke Franz Ferdinand of Austria (representing the Austrian Emperor)
- (Russian Empire) Grand Duke Michael Alexandrovich of Russia (representing the Russian Emperor)
- (Kingdom of Italy) The Duke of Aosta (representing the King of Italy)
- (Thailand) The Crown Prince of Siam (representing the King of Siam)
- (Grand Duchy of Baden) The Hereditary Grand Duke of Baden (representing the Grand Duke of Baden)
- (Kingdom of Bavaria) Prince Arnulf of Bavaria (representing the Prince Regent of Bavaria)
- Prince Edward of Saxe-Weimar (representing the Grand Duke of Saxe-Weimar-Eisenach)
- The Prince of Waldeck and Pyrmont
- The Prince of Hohenzollern
- (Khedivate of Egypt) Prince Mohammed Ali Tewfik (representing the Khedive of Egypt and Sudan)
- (Duchy of Saxe-Altenburg) Prince Ernst of Saxe-Altenburg (representing the Duke of Saxe-Altenburg)
- The Thakore Sahib of Morvi

=== Nobility ===
- The Duke of Norfolk
- The Duke and Duchess of Buccleuch
- The Duke of Northumberland
- The Duke of Beaufort
- The Duke of Montrose
- The Duke of Portland
- The Marquess of Londonderry
- The Earl Waldegrave
- The Earl of Clarendon
- The Earl of Pembroke
- The Earl of Harewood
- The Earl of Haddington
- The Earl Cawdor
- The Earl Howe
- The Earl of Kintore
- The Earl of Gosford
- The Earl of Denbigh
- The Countess of Lytton
- The Viscount Valentia
- The Viscount Galway
- The Viscount Wolseley
- The Lord Roberts
- The Lord Belper
- The Baron Lawrence
- The Lord Colville of Culross
- The Lord Churchill
- Earl of Kerry
- Earl of March
- Lord William Cecil
- Victor Cavendish

== See also ==
- Death and state funeral of Edward VII
- Death and state funeral of Elizabeth II
- Death and state funeral of George V
- Death and state funeral of George VI
- State funerals in the United Kingdom – For a monarch or approved by the monarch

== Bibliography ==
- Range, Matthias (2016). British Royal and State Funerals. Boydell Press.
