= BL 15-pounder gun =

British field gun

Ordnance BL 15-pounder
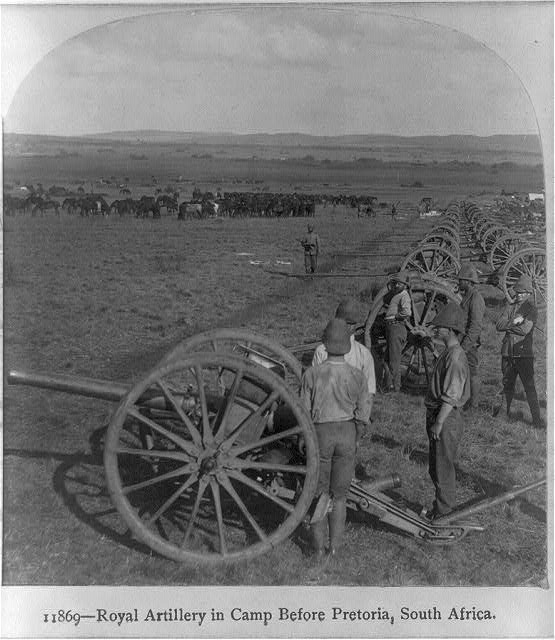
- 15-pounder in South Africa during the Second Boer War
- Type: Field gun
- Place of origin: United Kingdom

Service history
- In service: 1892–1918
- Used by: British Empire
- Wars: Second Boer War; World War I

Specifications
- Barrel length: 84 in (2.134 m) (28 calibres)
- Shell: Separate loading BL, 14 lb (6.4 kg) shrapnel
- Calibre: 3-inch (76.2 mm)
- Elevation: -5° - 16°
- Rate of fire: 7-8 rds/min
- Muzzle velocity: 1,590 ft/s (480 m/s)
- Maximum firing range: 6000 yds

The Ordnance BL 15-pounder, otherwise known as the 15-pounder 7 cwt, was the British Army's field gun in the Second Boer War and some remained in limited use in minor theatres of World War I. It fired a shell of 3-inch (76 mm) diameter with a maximum weight of 15 pounds (6.8 kg), hence its name which differentiated it from its predecessor '12-pounder' 3-inch (76 mm) gun which fired shells weighing only 12.5 pounds (5.7 kg). (Note: The British at that time traditionally identified smaller guns by the maximum weight of shell they could fire, arbitrarily rounded up or down.)

== History ==
The gun was a modified version of the previous BL 12-pounder 7 cwt gun of 1883. When the modern smokeless propellant cordite replaced gunpowder in 1892 it was decided that the 12-pounder was capable of firing a heavier shell up to 15 lb (6.8 kg). A 14-pound (6.4 kg) shell was adopted and the gun was renamed a 15-pounder.

Mk I carriage : recoil was controlled by drag-shoes. These were placed under the wheels, and were connected by chains and cables to the wheel hubs and the trail.

Mk II carriage : this had the same drag-shoe system and also a hydraulic buffer. This only allowed a short recoil, and was not successful.

Mk III carriage : In 1899 a rudimentary recoil system was added, consisting of a "spade" beneath the axle which dug in when the gun recoiled, connected by a steel wire to a spring in a cylinder on the trail. Mk I and II carriages fitted with these were known as Mk 1* and Mk II*. The latter retained the hydraulic buffer.

Although the whole gun jumped and moved backwards on firing, the spring returned it to firing position and hence still increased the rate of fire compared to the old model without any recoil mechanism. Hogg and Thurston comment ironically : "It is said that it checked it [recoil] so well that the gun usually recoiled 1 foot [30 cm] and jumped forward 2 feet [61 cm]".

Other Mks of carriage followed, all with axle-spades, but without buffers.

From 1904 the BL 15-pounder was superseded by the modern QF 18-pounder. Remaining BL 15-pounders were upgraded as the BLC 15-pounder to equip the Territorial Force with an "ersatz QF gun".

== Combat use ==
The gun was normally towed by 6 horses, in 3 pairs.

=== Second Boer War ===
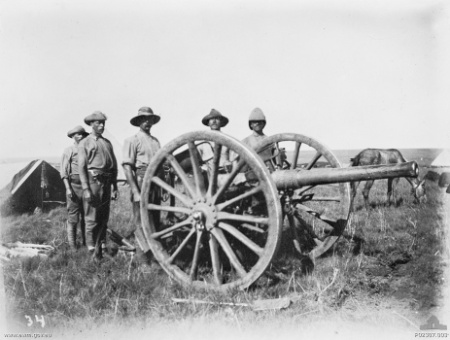
Australians with gun, Second Boer War, 1901

349 guns were in service in the Second Boer War 1899–1902 and fired 166,548 shells out of the British total of 233,714.

While the gun could fire a shell up to approximately 5,800–5,900 yards (5,300–5,400 m), the No. 56 time and percussion fuze in use in 1899 could only be set for a maximum timed range of 4,100 yards (3,700 m) because it only burned for 13 seconds. The shrapnel shells in use were usually time-set to burst in the air above and in front of the enemy. Hence the gunners had to get within approximately 4,200 yards (3,800 m) of the enemy to fire on them. The fuze could be set to explode on contact (percussion) up to the maximum range, but shrapnel exploding on contact was of little use. This was rectified later in the war by the No. 57 "blue fuze" which could be time set up to 5,800–5,900 yards (5,300–5,400 m).

=== World War I ===
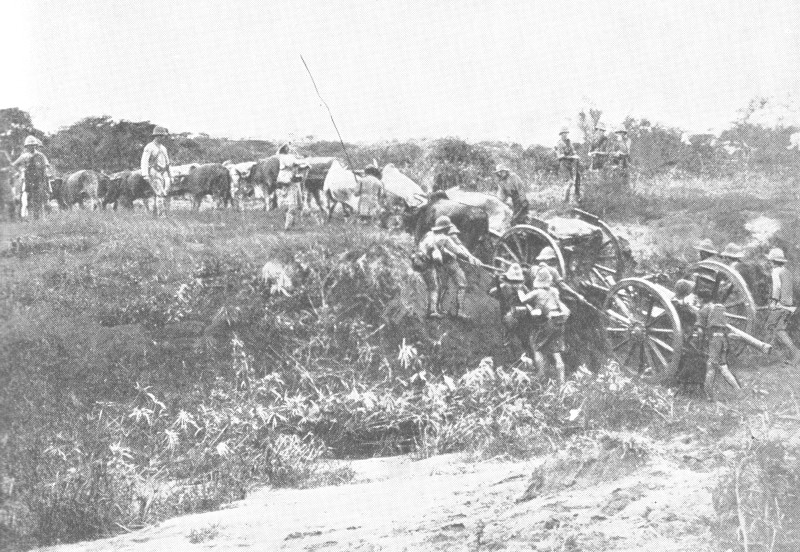
Gun of 7th Field Battery towed by oxen, German East Africa, World War I

7th Field Battery (4 guns, originally No. 2 and No. 6 Light Batteries) towed by oxen and known as the Oxo Battery and manned by Mauritian and South African gunners fought in the German East Africa campaign in World War I.

== Ammunition ==
15 3/4 ounces (450 g) Cordite cartridge, early 1900s	No. 56 Fuze as used in Second Boer War	Mk VI Shrapnel shell	Mk V Case shot	Mk IV T friction tube

== See also ==
- Ordnance BLC 15-pounder : modernised version
- Field artillery
- List of field guns

=== Weapons of comparable role, performance and era ===
- 7.7 cm FK 96 German equivalent

== Surviving examples ==
- HM Royal Armouries Fort Nelson, Fareham, Hampshire, England
- At the Royal Artillery Museum, Woolwich, London
- BL 15pr ^{8}/_{1} cwt number 599 is stored at the Queensland Museum's Hendra facility in Brisbane.

== Bibliography ==
- Dale Clarke, British Artillery 1914–1919. Field Army Artillery. Osprey Publishing, Oxford UK, 2004 ISBN 978-1-84176-688-1
- General Sir Martin Farndale, History of the Royal Regiment of Artillery : Forgotten Fronts and the Home Base 1914–18. London: Royal Artillery Institution, 1988. ISBN 978-1-870114-05-9
- Major Darrell D. Hall, "Guns in South Africa 1899–1902" in The South African Military History Society. Military History Journal – Vol 2 No 1, June 1971
- Major Darrell D. Hall, "Field Artillery of the British Army 1860–1960. Part I, 1860–1900" in The South African Military History Society. Military History Journal – Vol 2 No 4, December 1972 (web page is incorrectly titled 1900–1914)
- Major Darrell D. Hall, "Field Artillery of the British Army 1860–1960. Part II, 1900–1914" in The South African Military History Society. Military History Journal – Vol 2 No 5, June 1973
- Major Darrell D. Hall, "AMMUNITION: 15-PR 7 cwt BL". in The South African Military History Society Military History Journal – Vol 3 No 4, December 1975
- I.V.Hogg & L.F. Thurston, British Artillery Weapons & Ammunition 1914–1918. London: Ian Allan, 1972. ISBN 978-0-7110-0381-1
