= Leverton & Sons =

Funeral directors in North London, England

Leverton & Sons Ltd
- Company type: Private
- Industry: Death care
- Founded: 1789; 237 years ago in London
- Founder: John Leverton
- Headquarters: Camden, London, United Kingdom
- Website: www.levertons.co.uk

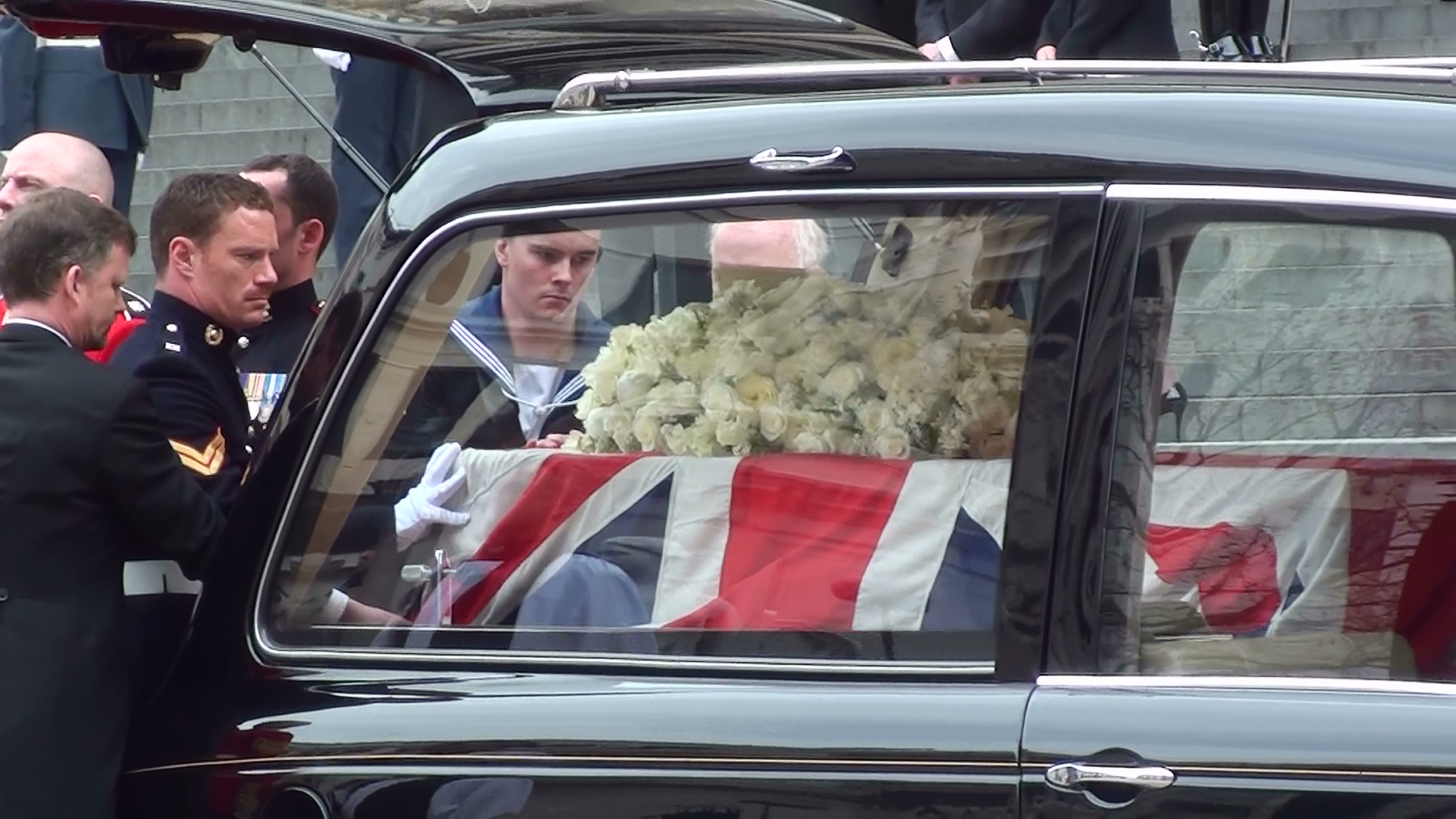
Margaret Thatcher's coffin being loaded into a hearse, 2013

Leverton & Sons Ltd is an independent family-run firm of funeral directors in Camden, London and the current funeral directors to the Royal Household. Established in 1789, the firm has been based in Camden for more than 200 years. Leverton & Sons arrange around 1,000 funerals a year and past funerals have included those of George Orwell, Kenneth Williams, Michael Foot, Margaret Thatcher and Queen Elizabeth II.

The firm was appointed by the Royal Household in 1991 and since then have arranged the funerals of Diana, Princess of Wales, Queen Elizabeth The Queen Mother, Prince Philip and Elizabeth II.

== History ==
Leverton & Sons was founded in 1789 by John Leverton (born 1763). Leverton, a carpenter, had moved to London from his native Devon in the 1780s to work in coffin-making. The firm passed to his son and then down the family line. In 2022 the company is being managed by John Leverton's great-great-great-great-great-grandchildren Andrew Leverton and Pippa Leverton, with Pippa's sister Hannah Leverton managing marketing and communications and former director Clive Leverton, Pippa and Hannah's father, serving as a consultant. The company is one of the oldest funeral directors in the United Kingdom. The firm is based in Mornington Crescent, Camden, where it moved in 1888, but has been based in Camden more than 200 years. It has branches at Golders Green, Kentish Town, Hampstead, Muswell Hill and Gospel Oak, all in north London.

Leverton & Sons handles around 1,000 funerals a year; these have included the funerals of Sir Henry Royce (d. 1933), George Orwell (d. 1950), Kenneth Williams (d. 1988), Michael Foot (d. 2010) and Margaret Thatcher (d. 2013). The firm also acted to recover the bodies of Cora Crippen, murdered by Doctor Crippen in 1910, and Joe Orton, murdered in 1967. For Thatcher's funeral, services the company provided included collection of the body from the Ritz Hotel; storage of the body at their mortuary in Ferdinand Place, Chalk Farm; dressing of the body and provision of a hearse and pallbearers to carry it into St Clement Danes Church. The firm also kept spare flags, bouquets and a hearse on hand in case any were damaged.

Leverton & Sons won a prize at the Good Funeral Awards in 2013 for introducing an environmentally-friendly electric-powered hearse. In 2014 Leverton & Sons were featured in an episode of the BBC's The One Show, filmed in November 2013. In July 2022 the firm acquired the first Nissan Leaf electric-powered hearse. The vehicle cost £109,950 and was converted by British coachbuilder Wilcox Limousines.

== Royal appointment ==
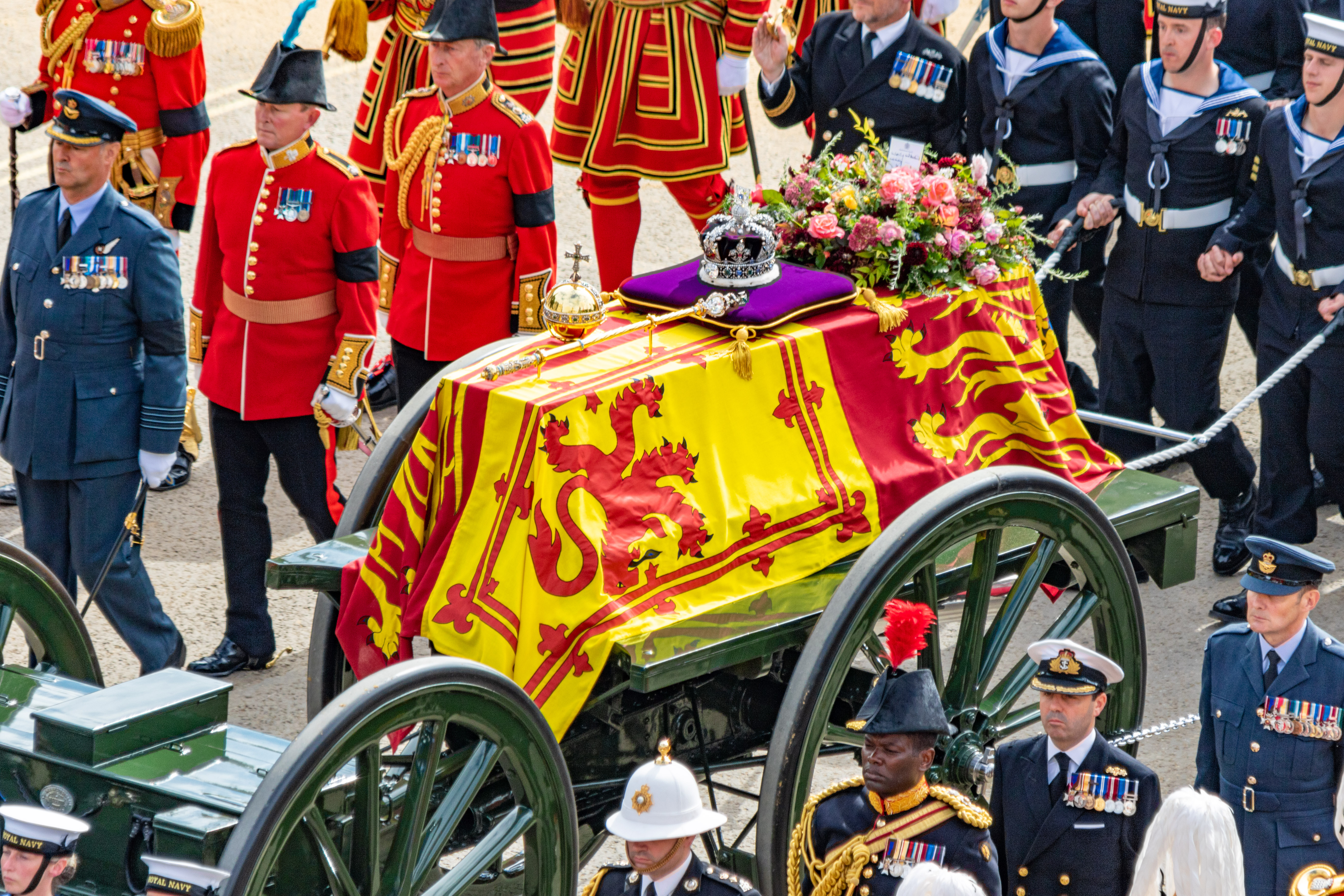
Elizabeth II's coffin leaving Westminster Abbey, 2022

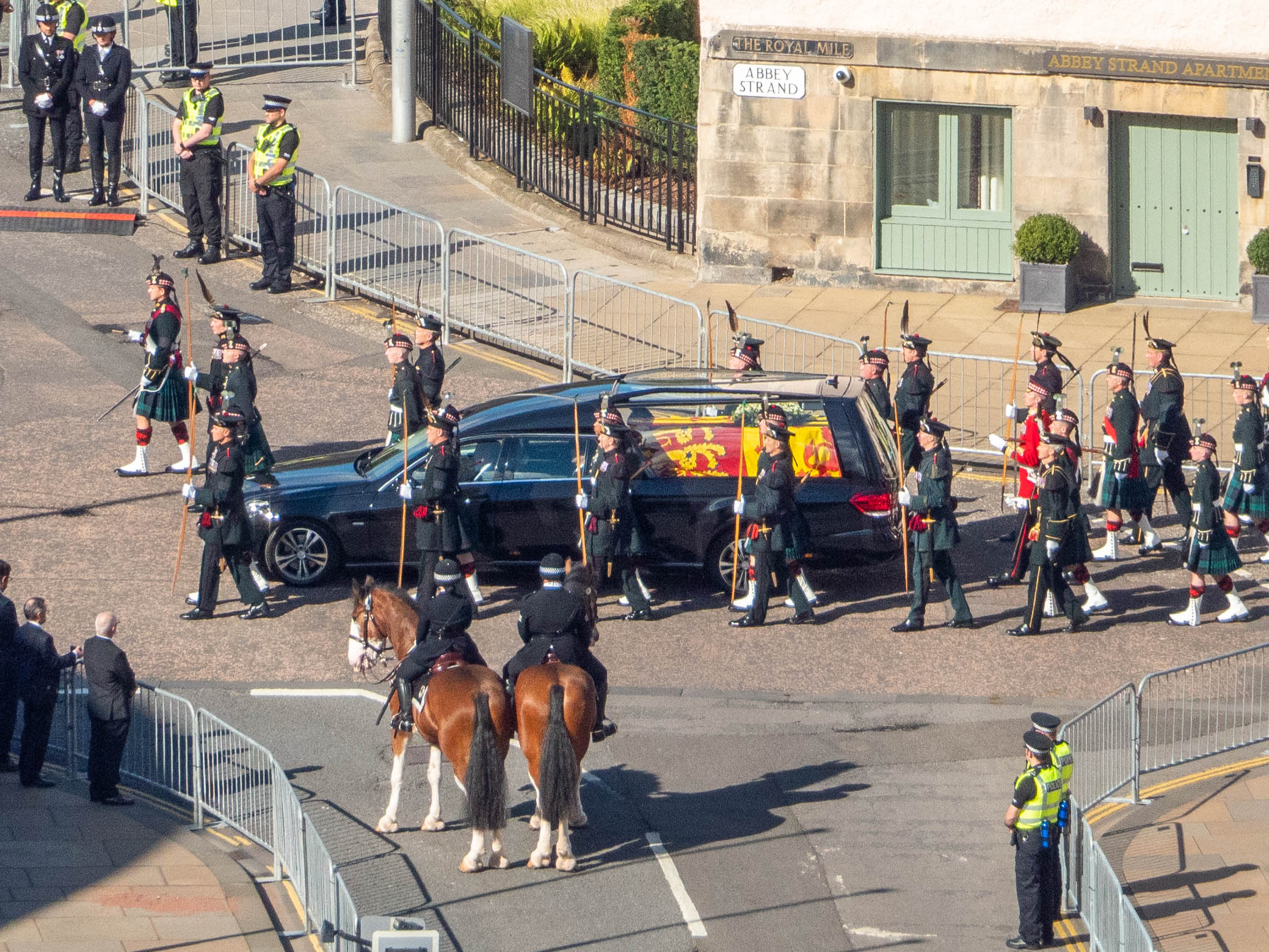
Coffin of Elizabeth II, carried by a William Purves hearse in Edinburgh

Leverton & Sons were appointed funeral directors to the Royal Household in 1991. Clive Leverton notes that there was no formal written contract and that "it was just a handshake really". One of the conditions that the Royal Household placed on the firm was that the appointment should not affect their service to existing customers. The company demonstrated this in 1997 when they arranged the funeral of Princess Diana. Leverton & Sons had 28 other funerals booked in the period between her death (31 August) and the funeral (6 September), all of which took place as planned. The firm has also arranged the funerals of Queen Elizabeth The Queen Mother (2002) and Prince Philip (2021). On 8 September 2022 the firm took charge of the remains of Elizabeth II following her death at Balmoral Castle and were appointed to arrange her funeral, though some of the work in Scotland was carried out by William Purves Funeral Directors of Edinburgh.

Leverton & Sons was given Elizabeth and Philip's coffins on becoming the Royal Undertaker. They had been commissioned by the previous royal undertakers from Henry Smith of Battersea, the last London-based coffin maker. The firm also keeps a "first call coffin" on hand in case of an unexpected royal death. At the inquest into Diana's death, the company revealed that Leverton & Sons kept on hand plans for managing the post-death arrangements of some members of the royal family and had a general plan for repatriation of bodies where death occurs abroad or in Scotland from which road transportation would not be practicable.

== See also ==
- State hearse - an official vehicle of the Royal Mews used for royal funerals in United Kingdom
