= Funeral directors to the Royal Household =

UK undertaking businesses

The funeral directors to the Royal Household of the Sovereign of the United Kingdom are selected and appointed by the Lord Chamberlain's Office.

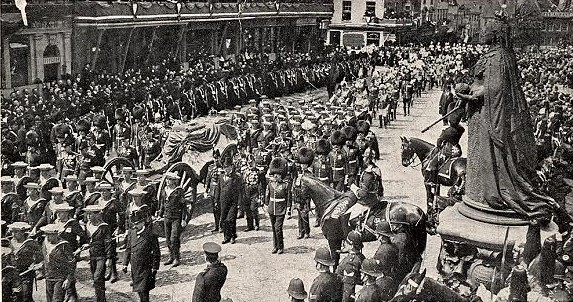
Procession during the funeral of Edward VII in 1910, assisted by William Banting funeral directors

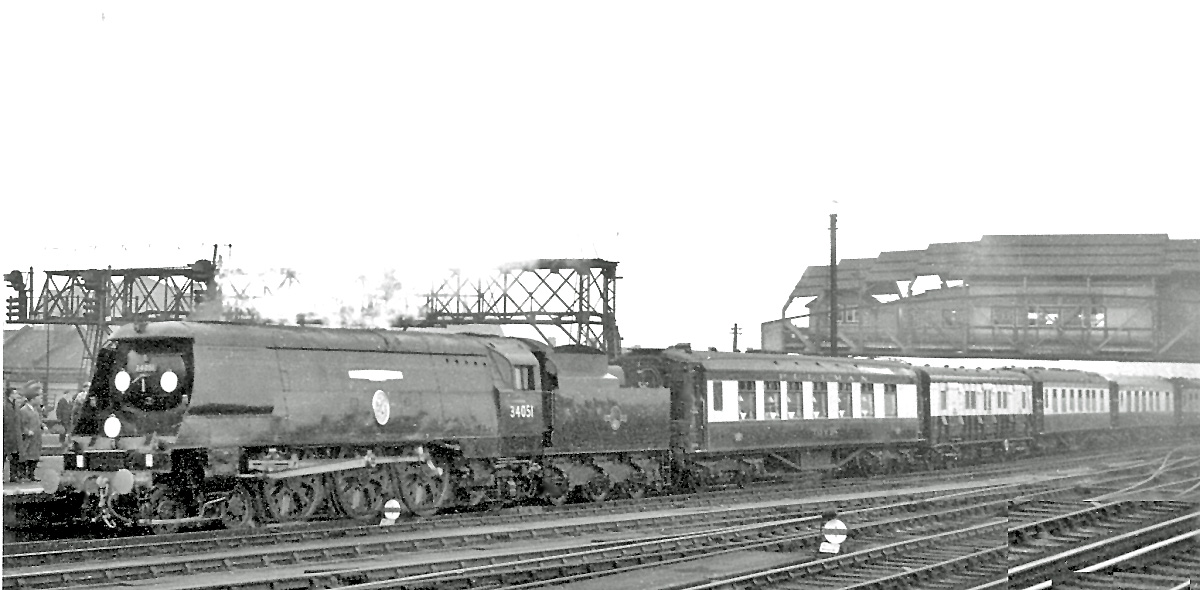
Train transport during the state funeral of Sir Winston Churchill in 1965, assisted by J. H. Kenyon Ltd

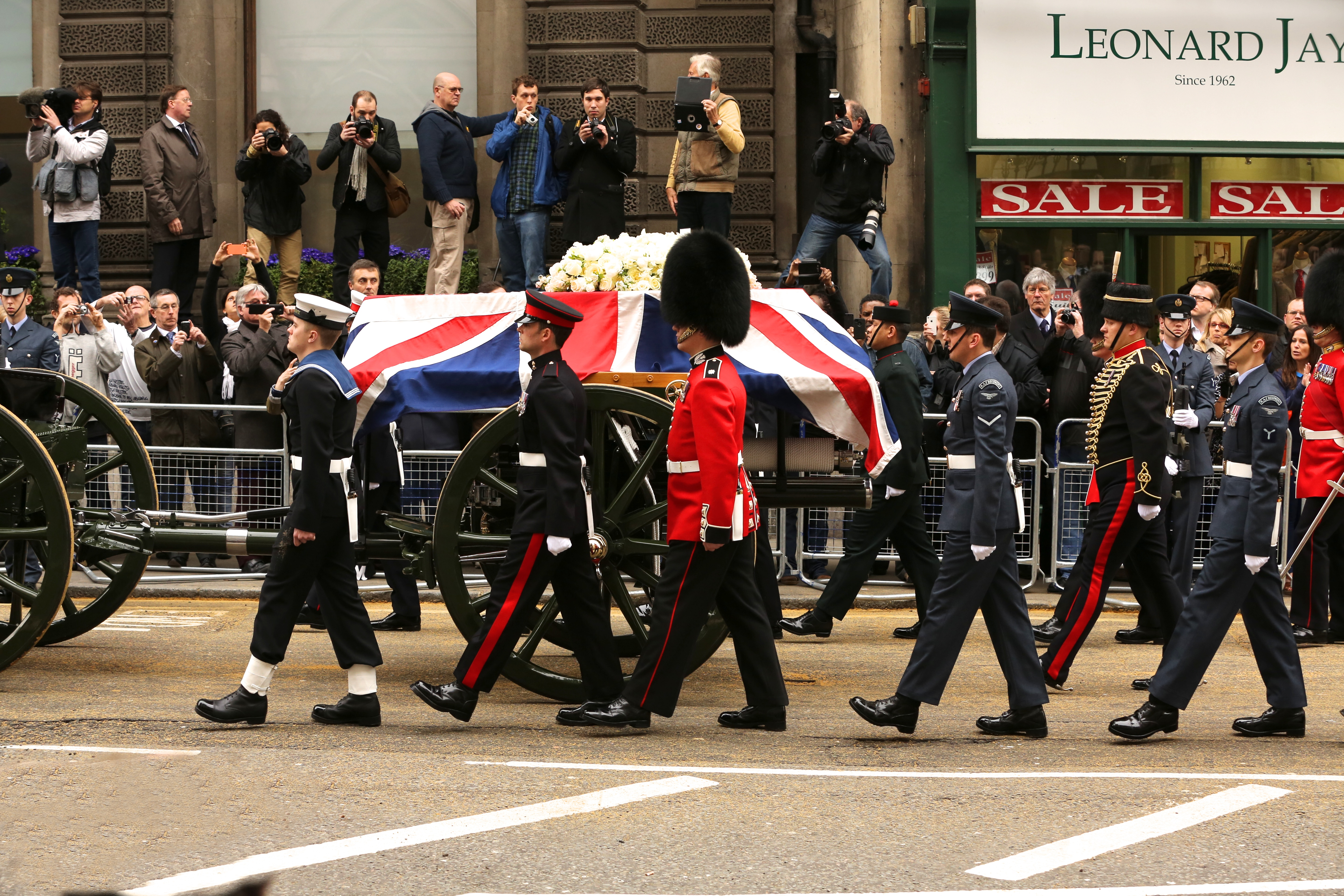
Procession during the funeral of Margaret Thatcher in 2013, assisted by Leverton & Sons

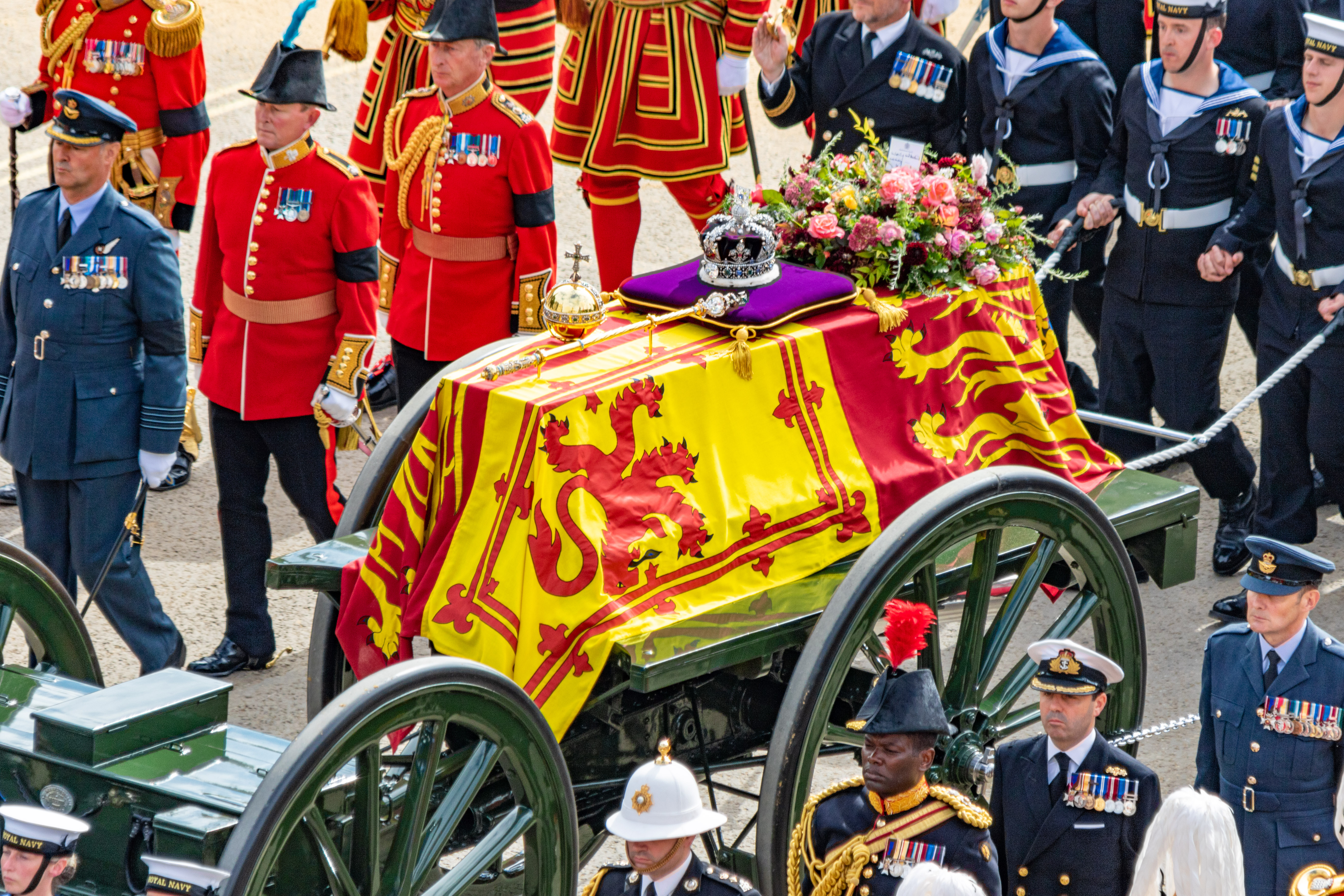
Procession leaving Westminster Abbey during the funeral of Elizabeth II in 2022, assisted by Leverton & Sons

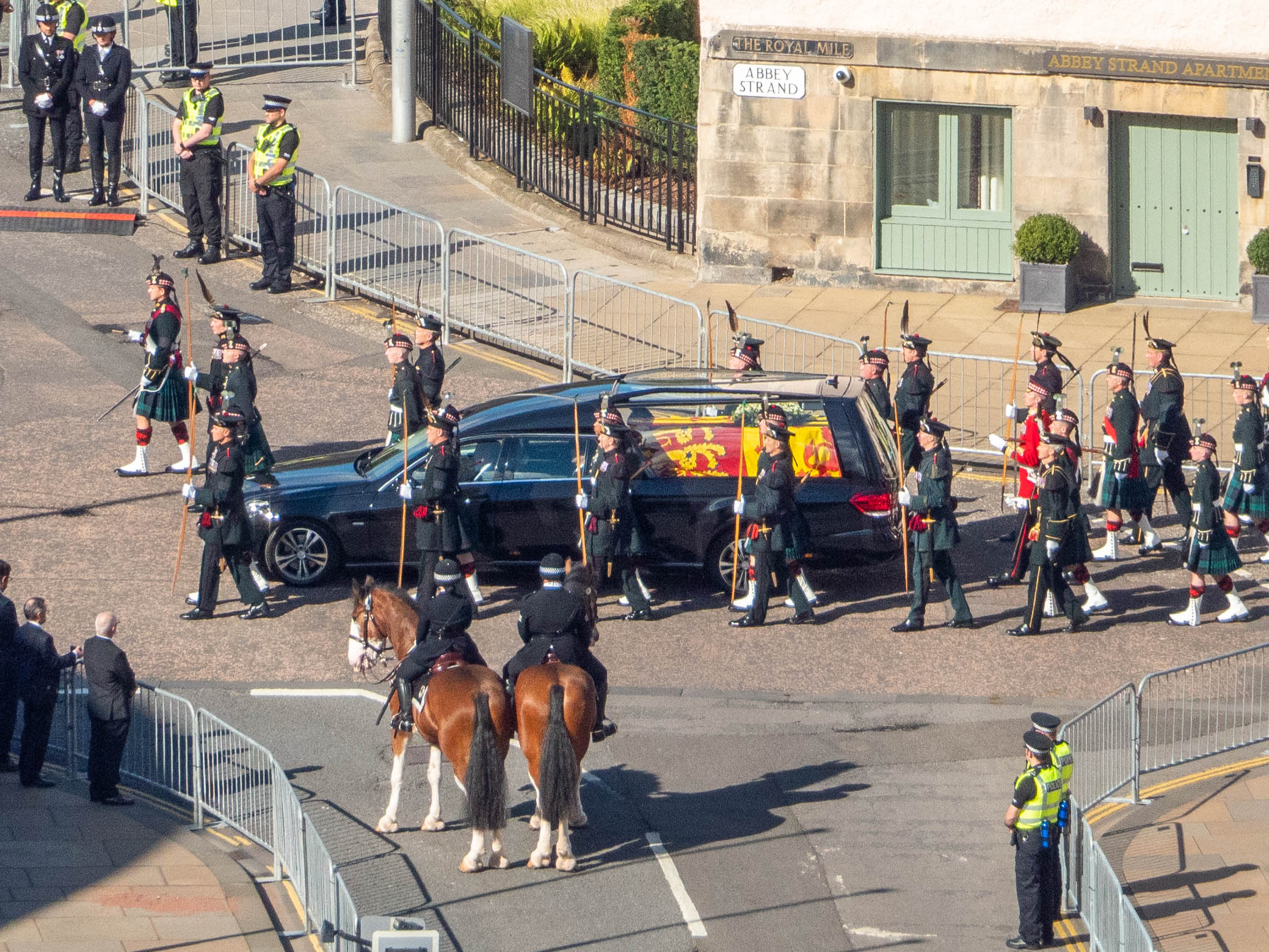
Procession of Elizabeth II's coffin in Edinburgh, assisted by William Purves Funeral Directors

== Role ==
Usually privately owned and commercially operated businesses, the funeral directors to the Royal Household do not have more than an occasional role, although they will be called upon if a death occurs in the Royal Family to assist in the funeral arrangements.

The same companies are normally used to assist during state or ceremonial funerals of eminent people outside the Royal Family, for example Sir Winston Churchill or Margaret Thatcher.

Although comparable in their role and function to Royal Warrant holders, the funeral directors serving the Royal Household do not traditionally advertise the fact that they work for the Royal Family.

== History ==
It is not known when the Royal Household of the Sovereign of the United Kingdom began to employ privately owned and commercially operated funeral directors' companies. In the early 19th century, the royal undertakers were the family business of William Banting of St. James’s Street, London. The Banting family conducted the funerals of King George III in 1820, King George IV in 1830, Prince William Frederick, Duke of Gloucester and Edinburgh in 1834, Arthur Wellesley, 1st Duke of Wellington in 1852, Prince Albert in 1861, Prince Leopold in 1884, Queen Victoria in 1901, and King Edward VII in 1910. The royal undertaking warrant for the Banting family ended in 1928 with the retirement of William Westport Banting.

After the Banting family had ceased to operate as royal funeral directors in 1928, several society undertaking firms lobbied for the warrant. It was finally awarded to the socially and politically well-connected Sir Harold Vaughan Kenyon, who also served six terms as Mayor of Paddington. His company had been established in 1880 by his father, James Harold Kenyon (1841-91) and was incorporated under the name of J. H. Kenyon Ltd in 1899. It was this company which oversaw the funerals of George VI in 1952, Queen Mary in 1953, and Sir Winston Churchill in 1965. The company's chief embalmer during this period was Desmond Henley. Another London firm, William Garstin, not J H Kenyon, assisted with the funeral arrangements for King George V.

In 1991, the royal undertaking warrant passed to Leverton & Sons, a 200-year-old family owned and operated firm of funeral directors. Leverton & Sons was established in St Pancras in 1763 by Devonshire carpenter John Leverton. In 1888, the business moved to Eversholt Street in Camden, north London, where its headquarters remain. In 2007 company director Clive Leverton explained the mode of appointment to The Daily Telegraph. "'There is no written contract,' he said. 'It is just a handshake really.'"

In 1997 Leverton & Sons assisted with the repatriation of the body of Diana, Princess of Wales. The company also organised the funerals of Queen Elizabeth The Queen Mother in 2002, Princess Margaret in 2002, Baroness Thatcher in 2013, Prince Philip, Duke of Edinburgh in 2021 and Queen Elizabeth II in 2022, where they were assisted in Scotland by William Purves Funeral Directors of Edinburgh.

== Royal undertaking warrant holders ==
- Until 1928: William Banting, St. James’s Street, London
- 1928 to 1991: J. H. Kenyon Ltd, Paddington, London
- 1991 to present: Leverton & Sons, Camden, London

== See also ==
- Ceremonial and state funerals in the United Kingdom
- State hearse - a vehicle of the Royal Mews used for royal funerals in United Kingdom
