= Desmond Henley =

English embalmer

Desmond Charles Henley, OBE (1927, Marylebone, London – 11 November 2005, Portsmouth) was an English embalmer.

== Career ==
After leaving school, Henley joined the London company of funeral directors James H. Kenyon Ltd in 1941. Established in 1880, J. H. Kenyon Ltd were the undertakers to the Royal Household, and had in that role assisted in arranging the funerals of many members of the Royal Family. After training in all theoretical and practical aspects of embalming, Henley passed his professional examinations in 1948. Four years later he was appointed the company's chief embalmer.

In 1961, Henley became an examiner of the British Institute of Embalmers. He also taught embalming techniques, embalming fluid formulas as well as disaster management to funeral directors. In an interview published in 1998, Henley expressed doubts that the mummification of Lenin's body in Moscow was indeed as permanent as claimed by the Russian authorities.

== Notable cases ==
In his role as chief embalmer for J. H. Kenyon Ltd, Henley carried out the embalming of King George VI at Sandringham House in 1952, that of Queen Mary at Marlborough House in 1953, and that of Sir Winston Churchill at the latter's London home at 28 Hyde Park Gate in 1965.

Churchill's body was embalmed in the same room where he had died on the morning of 24 January 1965, a Sunday. When the process was completed, the remains were dressed in his silk pyjamas and dressing robe and placed back into his bed. Churchill would lie in repose in private at his Hyde Park Gate home until 9:00 pm Tuesday evening when Kenyon's staff transported his remains to Westminster Hall to lie in state and for the funeral at St Paul's Cathedral.

Four years later, Henley embalmed the remains of Mutesa II of Buganda; and when Idi Amin had Mutesa II's body returned from London to Uganda in 1971, Henley was requested to accompany it. In 1973, Aristotle Onassis had Henley flown to Athens in his private jet to embalm the body of his son, Alexander. Henley also oversaw the embalming of Judy Garland in 1969, Jimi Hendrix in 1970, Field Marshal Lord Montgomery in 1976, Admiral of the Fleet Lord Mountbatten of Burma in 1979, Bon Scott in 1980, and Billy Fury in 1983.

In the time between 1963 and 1976, Henley also worked extensively in Bahrain, Qatar, Saudi Arabia, Abu Dhabi, Benin and Malawi, and continued to advise royal families worldwide until his retirement from J. H. Kenyon Ltd in 1992, after 51 years of service.

== Disaster management ==
After training in disaster management, Henley also served as head of J. H. Kenyon Ltd's emergency services mortuary team. In this role he was involved in the recovery and repatriation of bodies after numerous disasters, including the Kano air disaster in Nigeria in 1973, the Zeebrugge ferry disaster in 1987 and the Lockerbie bombing in 1988.

It was for this work at major disasters around the world that Henley was appointed an Officer of the Order of the British Empire "for services in the aftermath of disasters involving the loss of human life" in the 1997 New Year Honours.

== Retirement and death ==
In retirement he lived in London and Portsmouth. His funeral was held on 23 November 2005 at St. Wilfrid's Church, Portsmouth, followed by cremation at Portchester Crematorium.

== Honours ==
- 1972: Freeman of the City of London
- 1987: Fellow of the British Institute of Embalmers
- 1997: Officer of the Order of the British Empire (OBE)
