= State funerals in the United Kingdom =

For a monarch or approved by the monarch

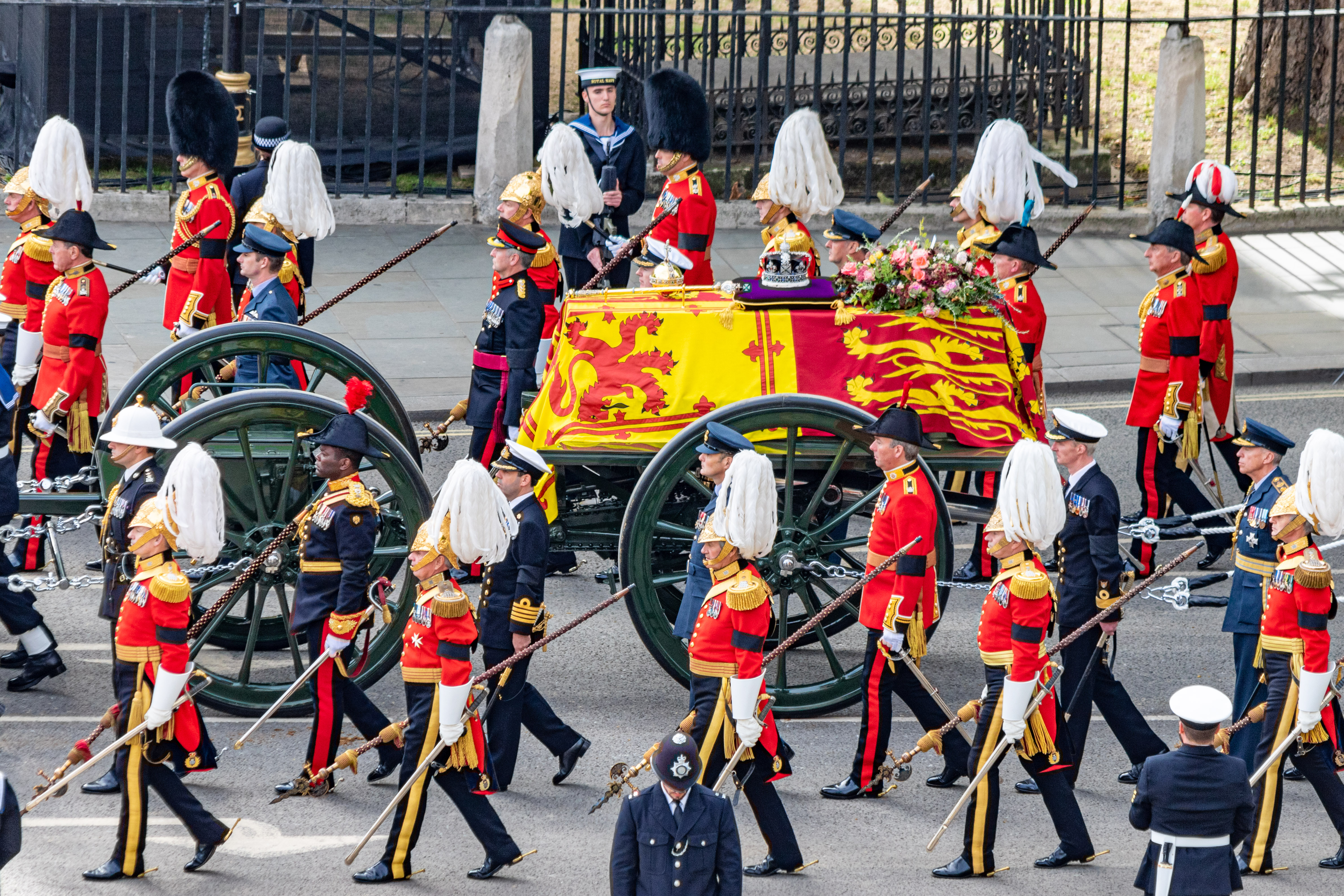
Funeral of Queen Elizabeth II, 2022. The coffin is borne on the Royal Navy State Funeral Gun Carriage, drawn by sailors of the Royal Navy. The coffin, draped with the Royal Standard, has the crown, orb and sceptre. Alongside the late Queen's equerries march the Gentlemen at Arms with axes reversed.

In the United Kingdom, state funerals are usually reserved for monarchs. The most recent was the state funeral of Queen Elizabeth II on 19 September 2022.

A state funeral may also be held to honour a highly distinguished figure following the approval of the monarch and Parliament (of the expenditure of public funds). The last non-royal state funeral in the United Kingdom was that of Sir Winston Churchill on 30 January 1965.

Other funerals, including those of senior members of the British royal family and high-ranking public figures, may share many of the characteristics of a state funeral without being categorised as such; for these, the term "ceremonial funeral" is used. In the past fifty years, ceremonial funerals have been held for Louis Mountbatten, 1st Earl Mountbatten of Burma (1979); Diana, Princess of Wales (1997); Queen Elizabeth the Queen Mother (2002); Margaret Thatcher, Baroness Thatcher (2013); and Prince Philip, Duke of Edinburgh (2021). Ceremonial funerals have tended in general to follow the ritual patterns of a state funeral (if on a somewhat smaller scale).

An exception was the funeral of the Duke of Windsor (former King Edward VIII), in 1972. Although the exiled Duke opted for a private family event instead of a full state funeral, it had one distinctive feature of a sovereign's funeral: traditional recitation of Edward's titles as monarch by the Garter King of Arms.

A gun carriage has been used to transport the coffin between locations since Queen Victoria's funeral (1901); it is also accompanied by a procession of military bands and detachments along with mourners and other officials. There may also be a lying in state and other associated ceremonies.

== Features of a state funeral ==
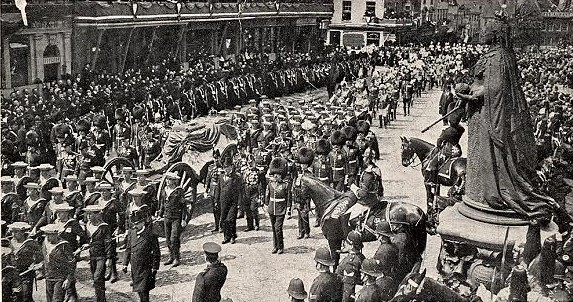
The gun-carriage procession approaching Windsor Castle during the state funeral of Edward VII

=== Overview ===
State funeral customs have evolved over time. For the funeral service itself, the Book of Common Prayer has been used in recent centuries, with readings from the Authorized Version of the Bible; in its essentials the form of service used is the same for a monarch as for any other person. Besides the presence of national and international dignitaries in large numbers, much of the distinctive character of a state funeral is set by the processions surrounding the conveyance of the coffin from place to place, and by the lying-in-state which generally precedes the funeral (until the 21st century these were the only elements that could be seen by members of the public). In many respects the obsequies of Queen Victoria in 1901 set the tone for the modern state funeral, with her desire to be buried "as a soldier's daughter" (the use of a gun carriage to transport the coffin, for example, dates from this time). The next three state funerals of a monarch (those of King Edward VII in 1910, of King George V in 1936 and of King George VI in 1952) all conformed to a similar pattern, albeit with individual differences and modifications (for example, the use of Westminster Hall for the lying-in-state dates from the time of the funeral of King Edward VII). Full ceremonial details of each funeral are recorded in the London Gazette (see "External links" below).

=== State funeral of Queen Elizabeth II ===
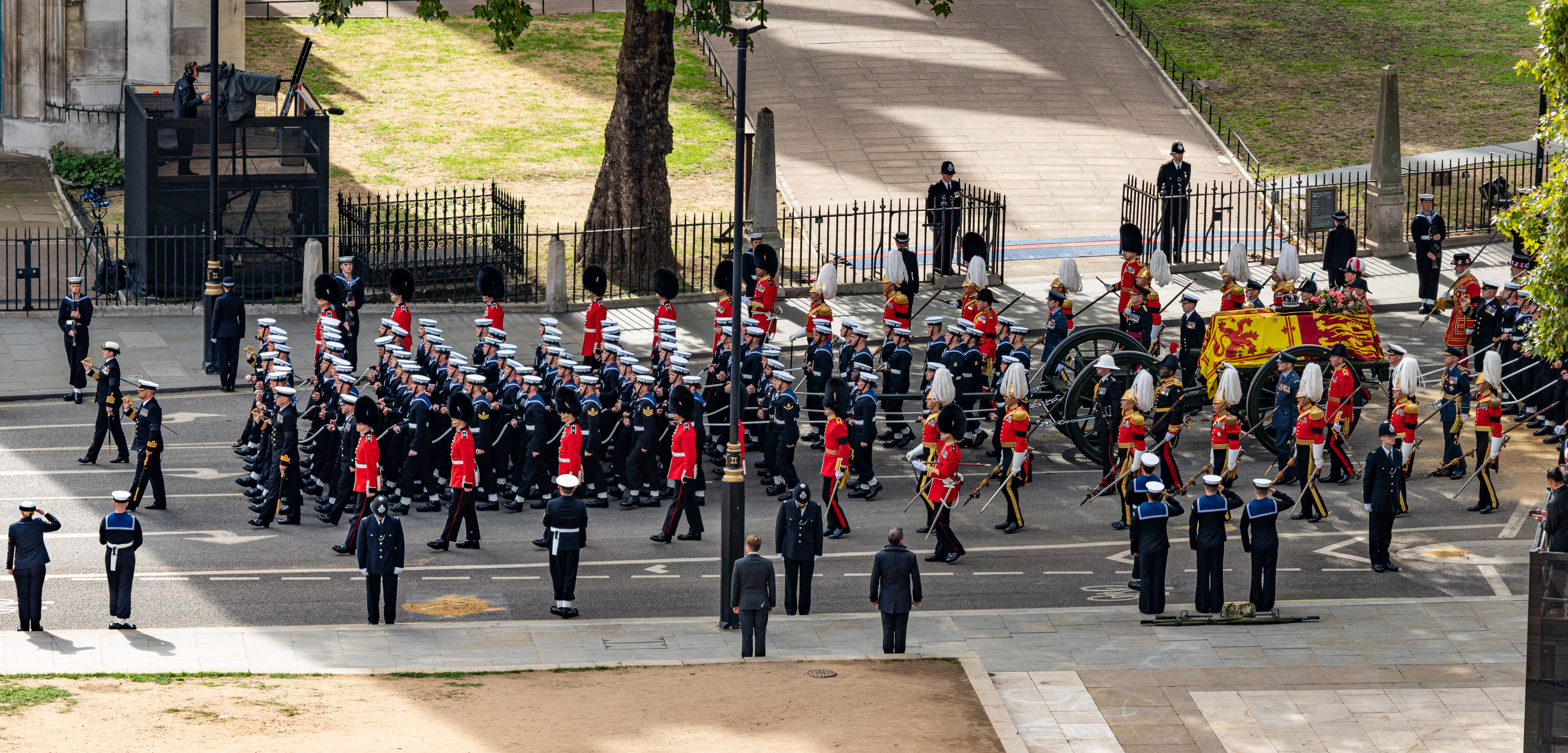
Naval ratings drawing the gun carriage to Westminster Abbey for the state funeral of Queen Elizabeth II; alongside them march the bearer party of Grenadier Guardsmen.

The state funeral of Queen Elizabeth II in 2022 followed the same general pattern and conformed in many of the same details. A notable difference, however, was that the funeral service itself was separated from the committal service (with the former taking place in Westminster Abbey and the latter at St George's Chapel, Windsor). Another distinguishing feature was occasioned by the fact that Queen Elizabeth had died at Balmoral in Scotland, which allowed an additional procession, service and Lying-in-State to be held in Edinburgh, prior to the coffin being brought to London.

For the first time, in 2022, the monarch's funeral service in Westminster Abbey was televised, as was the committal service in St George's Chapel.

The events in London and Windsor took place as follows:

- Conveyance of the body to Westminster Hall. From Buckingham Palace the Queen's coffin was transported to Westminster on a horse-drawn gun carriage of the King's Troop, Royal Horse Artillery, escorted by military contingents, preceded by members of the late Queen's Household and followed on foot by the King and other members of the Royal Family. The coffin was draped with the Royal Standard, and on it was placed the Imperial State Crown and a wreath of flowers. The late monarch's current and former equerries served as pallbearers, walking alongside the coffin; while the 'bearer party' (which carried the coffin when required) was made up of eight guardsmen, accompanied by two officers.
- Lying in state in Westminster Hall. The coffin was placed on a catafalque in the middle of the hall. Following a brief service, the Orb and Sceptre were placed on the coffin, in addition to the Crown and flowers. Members of the public were then admitted and, over the course of four days and nights, filed past the coffin to pay their respects. During the lying in state each corner of the catafalque was guarded by units of the Sovereign's Bodyguard and the Household Division.
- Conveyance of the body from Westminster Hall to Westminster Abbey. For this procession the State Gun Carriage was hauled by 138 sailors of the Royal Navy. The coffin was escorted by the sovereign's bodyguards: the Gentlemen at Arms, the Yeomen of the Guard and the Royal Company of Archers.
- State Funeral Service in Westminster Abbey. The service was attended by the King and seventy other members of the wider royal family, along with Heads of State and other overseas representatives, those representing the Realms, the Commonwealth, Government, Parliament, the devolved Parliaments and Assemblies, the Church, charities and recipients of state honours. The service was conducted by the Dean of Westminster and a sermon was preached by the Archbishop of Canterbury, who also pronounced the Commendatory prayer. The lessons were read by the Commonwealth Secretary-General Baroness Scotland of Asthal and the then Prime Minister of the United Kingdom Liz Truss.
- Conveyance of the body from Westminster Abbey to Windsor Castle. A large procession accompanied the monarch's body for the first part of its final journey to Windsor (from the Abbey to Hyde Park Corner), including Armed Forces detachments from the UK and the Commonwealth realms. At Wellington Arch the coffin was transferred to the State Hearse and travelled by road to Windsor. For the last part of the journey, through Windsor Great Park, the procession was reassembled and accompanied the hearse to Windsor Castle, where it was joined again by members of the Royal Family.
- Committal service in St George's Chapel, Windsor Castle. The service was conducted by the Dean of Windsor, with the Archbishop of Canterbury giving the final Blessing. Alongside the King and members of the Royal Family, the congregation was made up of past and present members of the Queen's Household along with the Governors General and Prime Ministers of the Commonwealth Realms. Prior to the lowering of the coffin into the royal vault, the Crown, Orb and Sceptre were removed from the coffin and placed on the altar; the new King placed the Queen's Company Camp Colour on the coffin, and following a centuries-old precedent, the Lord Chamberlain (the head of the late Queen's Household) broke his white staff of office to symbolize the end of his period of service to the late monarch. The Garter King of Arms then pronounced the style of the deceased monarch, using a form of words that has varied little over centuries of use.
- Burial in the King George VI Memorial Chapel: this took place privately later on the day of the funeral, with the immediate family only in attendance.

=== Other state funerals ===
State funerals of distinguished citizens have followed a similar pattern to those of the monarch, except for the location of the funeral and burial. Churchill's body was taken by gun carriage from Westminster Hall (where it had lain in state) to St Paul's Cathedral for the funeral, which was said at that time to have been the largest in world history, bringing together representatives from 112 nations. Afterwards, his body was taken by river (on board the Port of London Authority launch Havengore) to Waterloo for the railway journey to Bladon for burial. His pallbearers were political and military leaders with whom he had worked closely during the war: Lord Attlee, Lord Avon, Harold Macmillan, Lord Ismay, Lord Slim, Lord Portal of Hungerford, Lord Alexander of Tunis and Lord Mountbatten of Burma.

== History ==
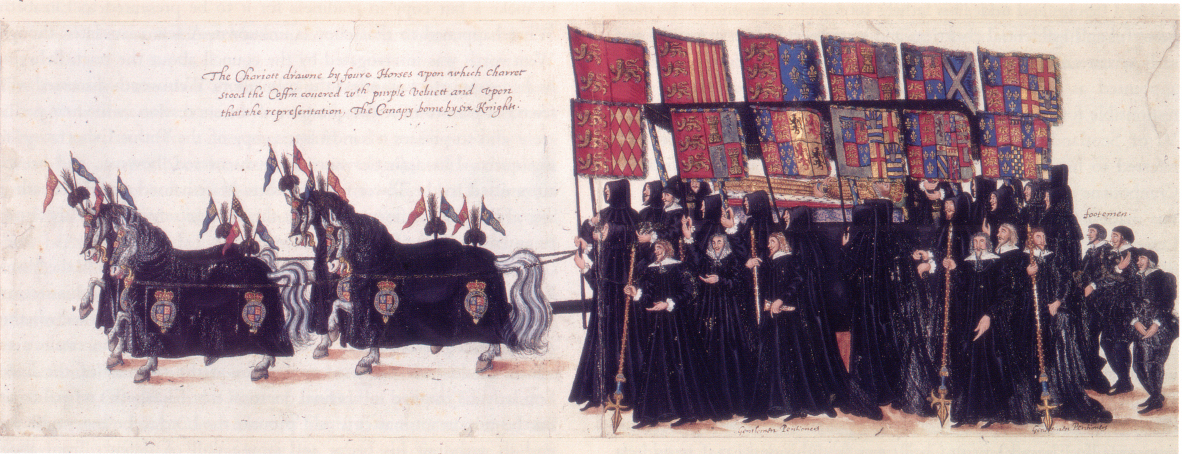
Funeral of Elizabeth I, 1603. Horse-drawn bier escorted, as in modern times, by Gentlemen-pensioners carrying their axes 'reversed'. The coffin has an effigy of the late Queen on top of it, and is flanked by knights holding banners and a canopy.

=== Location ===
From 1820, up to and including the funeral of King George VI in 1952, funerals of monarchs were held in St George's Chapel, Windsor Castle, with the burial also taking place there (or, in the case of Queen Victoria, in the nearby Frogmore Mausoleum). In earlier centuries, Westminster Abbey was the usual venue for both funeral and burial (albeit with several exceptions: for instance, Henry VIII was buried at Windsor, whilst James II and George I were both buried overseas). The funeral of Queen Elizabeth II was also held in Westminster Abbey; it was followed on the same day by a committal service in St George's Chapel, Windsor. The burial took place privately that same evening (attended by immediate family only) in the adjacent King George VI Memorial Chapel.

The funeral of Admiral Nelson in 1806 set the precedent for St Paul's Cathedral being used as a grand venue for funerals of distinguished subjects. The State Funerals of Wellington and Churchill also took place there, as, more recently, did the ceremonial funeral of Baroness Thatcher. In the past half century, royal ceremonial funerals have tended to be held in Westminster Abbey (e.g. those of Lord Mountbatten, Diana, Princess of Wales and Queen Elizabeth the Queen Mother) with the burial in each case taking place privately elsewhere; however, the royal ceremonial funeral of Prince Philip (the consort of Elizabeth II) took place in St George's Chapel, Windsor, in unusual circumstances: because of the COVID restrictions in place at that time, which permitted a maximum of only 30 mourners to be in attendance, the ceremonial was greatly pared down.

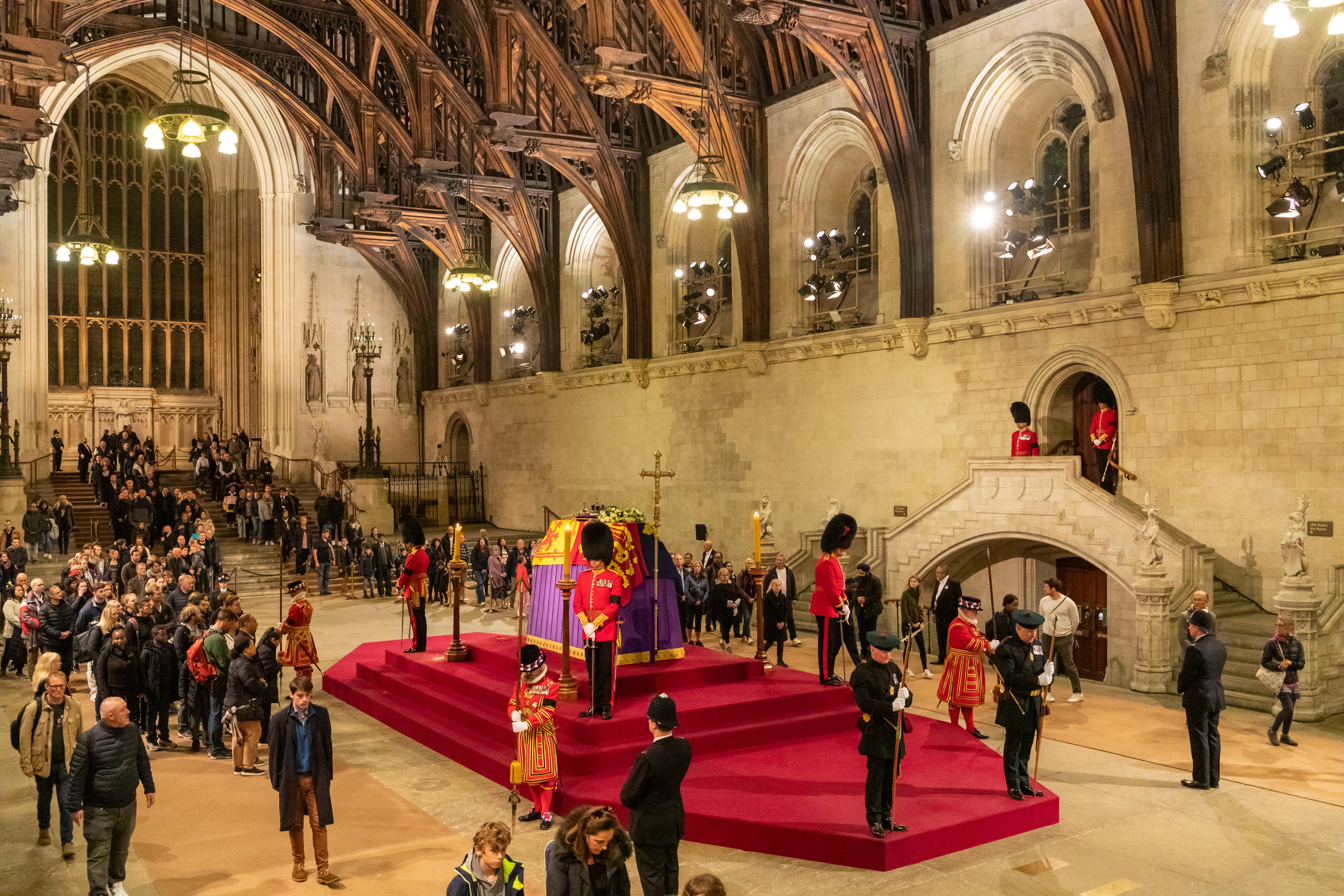
In recent times Westminster Hall has been used for the lying-in-state of monarchs, including that of Elizabeth II in 2022 (pictured).

Allowing the body of a monarch or nobleman to lie in state (for the public to pay their respects) is a long-established custom dating back many centuries, and is analogous to the once widespread practice of laying out a corpse for mourners at their home prior to a funeral. The use of Westminster Hall for this purpose, though, is comparatively modern, having begun with the state funeral of William Gladstone in 1898 (until 1882 the hall had been in use as law courts, and would not have been available for state events at short notice). The first monarch to lie in state there was Edward VII in 1910, and the first consort Queen Mary (1953). Monarchs in the 19th century all lay in state in Windsor Castle. In the 18th century Kensington Palace was often used, while in the 17th century the Palace of Whitehall was generally preferred. In earlier times, entry to the lying in state had been restricted to the gentry and nobility, but following the death of King George III in 1820 the public at large were admitted to the lying in state at Windsor Castle (where around 30,000 people filed past the late king's coffin in the two days before his funeral); this set the pattern for subsequent monarchs (with the exception of Queen Victoria, who had stipulated that her body should not lie in state).

Beforehand, the body will often have lain in a private room or chapel elsewhere (e.g. At the place of death) for private viewing. Both George V and George VI died at Sandringham and their bodies lay in the church there for a time, watched over by estate workers and gamekeepers; whereas the body of Edward VII lay in the throne room in Buckingham Palace. Elizabeth II died at Balmoral Castle; her body lay in the ballroom there for two days, allowing estate workers and family members to pay their respects, before being transported to Edinburgh, where it lay overnight in the Throne Room at Holyrood House prior to a public lying in state in St Giles' Cathedral. It then lay overnight in the Bow Room at Buckingham Palace, before being taken in procession to Westminster Hall for the public lying in state.

=== Rites and ceremonies ===
==== Pre-1700: Heraldic funerals ====
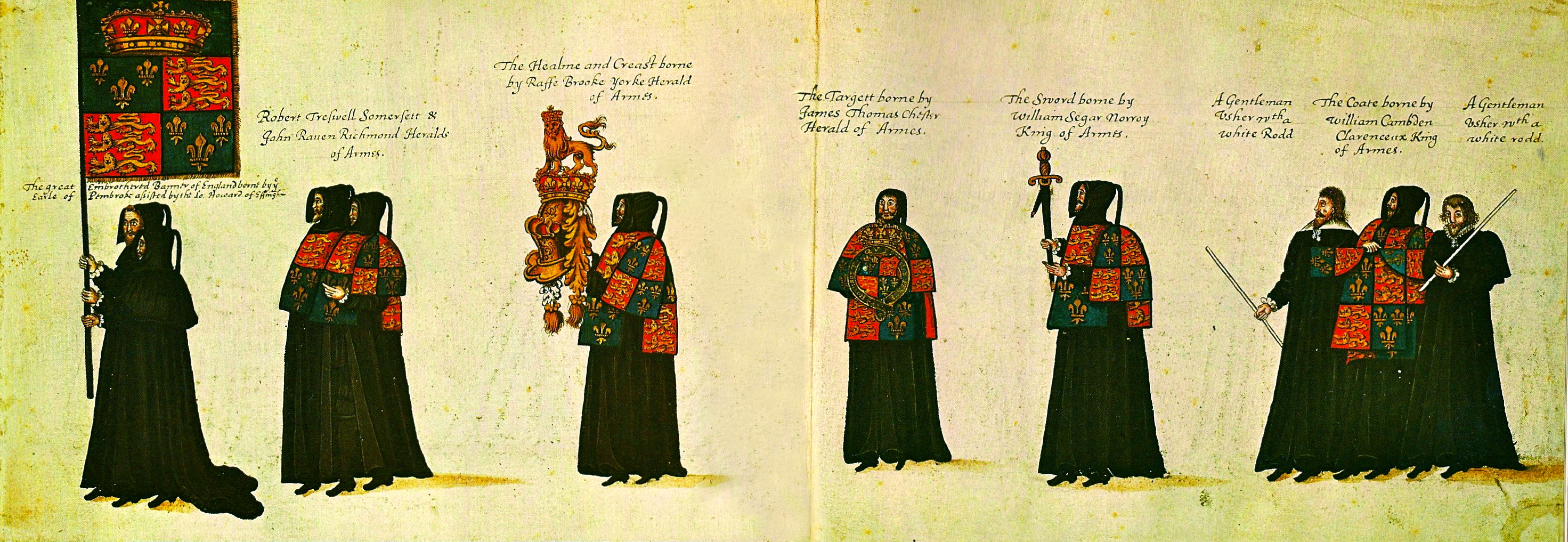
Heralds at the funeral of Elizabeth I in 1603.

Tudor and Jacobean State funerals had a strongly heraldic flavour (this in fact had been a distinguishing feature of both royal and noble funerals since the Late Middle Ages). The Exchequer customarily provided all those taking part in the procession (from 'poor men' and servants to nobles and royalty) with lengths of black cloth for their mourning garb. Noblemen in particular wore full-length black mourning cloaks, and hoods drawn down over their faces; while noblewomen (who played a key role in the funeral processions for a female monarch or consort) wore a long straight gown with a trained surcoat, coupled with a white wimple-like head covering. The quality and amount of material in these garments was strictly regulated by the College of Arms, according to the rank of the wearer: thus, a seventeenth-century Duke was permitted 16 yards of fabric at 10s a yard, a Knight only 5 yards at 6s.8d.

As well as the mourners, the horses were dressed all in black, and it was customary for black drapes to be hung along the route of the procession. Color was provided by the heralds, who wore tabards over their mourning cloaks and carried the late monarch's achievements in the procession. Colorful heraldic banners were also carried at various points in the procession. The coffin was borne on a horse-drawn bier or 'chariot' and covered by a richly embroidered pall. Those of the highest rank in society were distinguished by having a canopy carried over their coffin, which remained held in place for the duration of the funeral service.

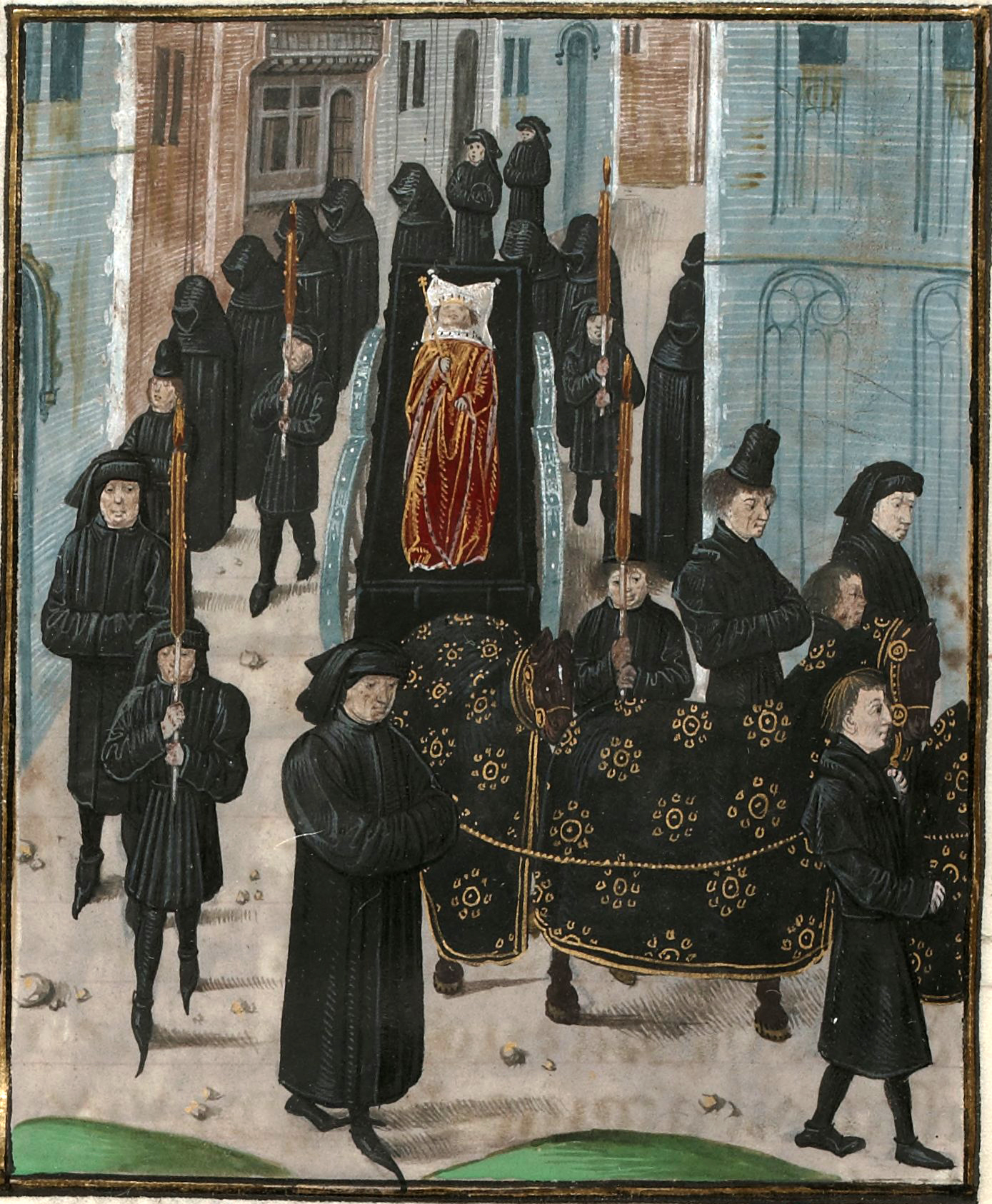
Funeral procession of Richard II in 1400: an effigy of the King's body is seen, wearing his Parliament robe and crown, and holding his sceptre.

From the fourteenth century onwards it became customary for a lifelike wooden effigy of the deceased person to be carried on or near the coffin in royal and noble funeral processions; previously, the embalmed body itself would probably have been on view. Surviving effigies, with contemporary clothing, are on display in Westminster Abbey; at the funeral of a monarch or queen consort the effigy was dressed in their coronation robes and regalia. The first king for whom a funeral effigy was made was Edward II in 1327, and the last effigy of a monarch to be carried in procession was that of James I at his funeral on 7 May 1625; since the funeral of his successor, Charles II, a crown on a cushion has instead been placed on the coffin.

Funerals were occasions for royal almsgiving, and a feature of medieval royal funerals was the contingent 'poor men' or 'alms men' who would walk in the procession offering prayers for the soul of the deceased. The prayers were suppressed at the Reformation, but poor men (and women) continued to receive charity and to take part in the procession. A contingent of 266 poor women walked at the head of the funeral procession for Elizabeth I, which made its way from Whitehall Palace to Westminster Abbey in 1603, and the Queen's High Almoner preached at the service. The procession, which numbered over a thousand participants in all, included peers and peeresses and their children on the one hand, marshalled according to rank, and a multitude of servants on the other, from the 'children of the scullery' and the 'yeomen of the boiling house' to the late Queen's sewers and the Maids of Honour of her Privy Chamber. The Great Officers of State were also in attendance, along with the chief justices, the Lord Mayor and Aldermen of London and numerous clerks and officials. The Master of the Horse led a Palfrey of Honour directly behind the coffin (a relic of a medieval tradition by which a late monarch's horse would follow them into church and be given as a perquisite to the Abbey); and then followed the chief mourner (who for Elizabeth I was the Marchioness of Northampton, premier noblewoman of England). At the back marched the Yeomen of the Guard. The chief officers of the late Queen's household carried their white staves of office in the procession; at the end of the funeral service (in accordance with tradition) they broke them across their knees and cast them into the grave as a sign that their duties were now at an end.

==== 1700–1900: Heraldic tradition maintained ====
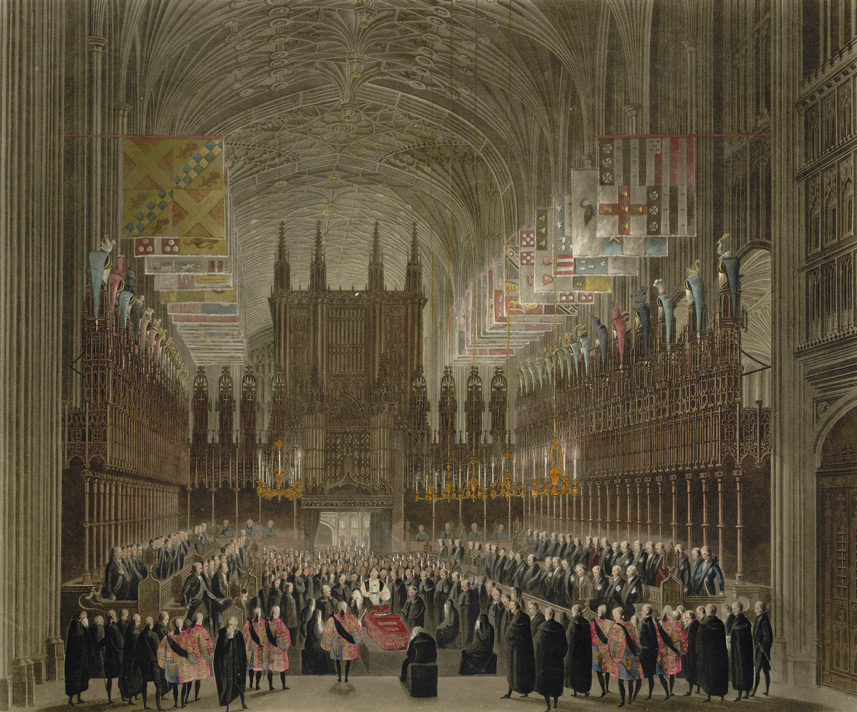
The funeral of Princess Charlotte of Wales (1796–1817) at St George's Chapel, Windsor.

Many of the above funeral practices persisted well into the nineteenth century. At the funeral of William IV (the last monarch to die before Queen Victoria) the chief mourner and his attendants still wore black mourning cloaks, black drapes were hung along the route of the procession and a black canopy was borne over the coffin. The coffin itself was covered with a purple velvet pall, embroidered with the Royal arms. The crowns of the United Kingdom and of Hanover were carried on cushions in the procession, and placed on the coffin for the service, and behind the coffin heraldic banners were carried: the banner of the royal arms and banners of the Union, of England, Ireland and Scotland, and also of Hanover and Brunswick.

At this time, and indeed in previous centuries, the procession at a state funeral was very clearly a state procession: thus, as well as members of the late monarch's household, it usually included the peerage, the privy council, the judiciary and other state officeholders. When King William IV attended the funeral of his late brother George IV, the Sword of State and Cap of Maintenance were carried before him, as at the State Opening of Parliament. Until the 20th century, monarchs by custom did not attend the funerals of their predecessors; William IV was an exception: not only did he attend, but he published a personal message of thanks in the Gazette for all who had participated. It was also rare for women to be seen in attendance, though the women of Queen Anne's royal household did walk in her funeral procession in 1714.

These funerals took place after sunset. At the funeral of William IV, for example, the procession from the lying in state set off at 8 pm; the Brigade of Guards lined the processional route (as they still do today), and one in four of them held a burning torch. The regiments involved were accompanied by their regimental bands (according to the Gazette, each band in turn played the Dead March in Saul as the procession approached their position along the route). As today, those bearing arms (swords or rifles), whether lining the route or marching in the procession, carried or held them reversed as a sign of mourning.

A tradition of firing 'minute guns' during the funeral procession is one that has been followed for over 300 years. Indeed, in 1830 and 1837 the guns began at 4 a.m., and they continued firing: once every five minutes for the next seventeen hours, and then once every minute from 9 p.m. Until the end of the ceremony.

Non-royal state funerals in the 19th century were very similar to those for monarchs, even down to a herald reading the style and titles of the deceased, and leading members of their household carrying white staves and breaking them at the graveside. One striking exception, though, was the state funeral of William Gladstone, which took place entirely without military involvement. Instead, the members of the Lords and the Commons walked in procession, each led by their respective presiding officer.

==== The funeral of Queen Victoria: an innovative approach ====
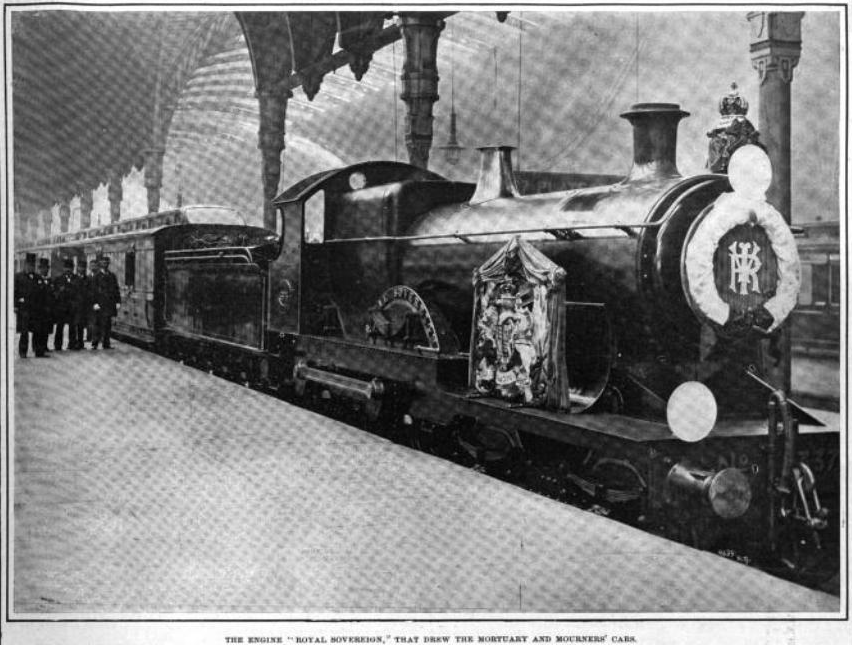
The Royal Train which took Queen Victoria's coffin and mourners from Paddington station to Windsor.

The state funeral of Queen Victoria took place in February 1901; it had been 64 years since the last burial of a monarch. Victoria left strict instructions regarding the service and associated ceremonies and instituted a number of changes, several of which set a precedent for state (and indeed ceremonial) funerals that have taken place since. First, she disliked the preponderance of funereal black; henceforward, there would be no black cloaks, drapes or canopy, and Victoria requested a white pall for her coffin. Second, she expressed a desire to be buried as "a soldier's daughter". The procession, therefore, became much more a military procession, with the peers, privy counsellors and judiciary no longer taking part en masse. Her pallbearers were equerries rather than dukes (as had previously been customary), and for the first time, a gun carriage was employed to convey the monarch's coffin. Third, Victoria requested that there should be no public lying in state. This meant that the only event in London on this occasion was a gun carriage procession from one railway station to another: Victoria having died at Osborne House (on the Isle of Wight), her body was conveyed by boat and train to Waterloo Station, then by gun carriage to Paddington Station, and thence by train to Windsor for the funeral itself. On the train's arrival in Windsor the horses that were formed up at the station broke away from the gun carriage, necessitating the recruitment of a nearby contingent of sailors to pull the coffin.

The rare sight of a state funeral cortège travelling by ship provided a striking spectacle: Victoria's body was carried on board HMY Alberta from Cowes to Gosport, with a suite of yachts following conveying the new king, Edward VII, and other mourners. Minute guns were fired by the assembled fleet as the yacht passed by. Victoria's body remained on board ship overnight (with Royal Marines keeping vigil) before being conveyed by gun carriage to the railway station the following day for the train journey to London.

==== Since 1901: innovation becomes tradition ====
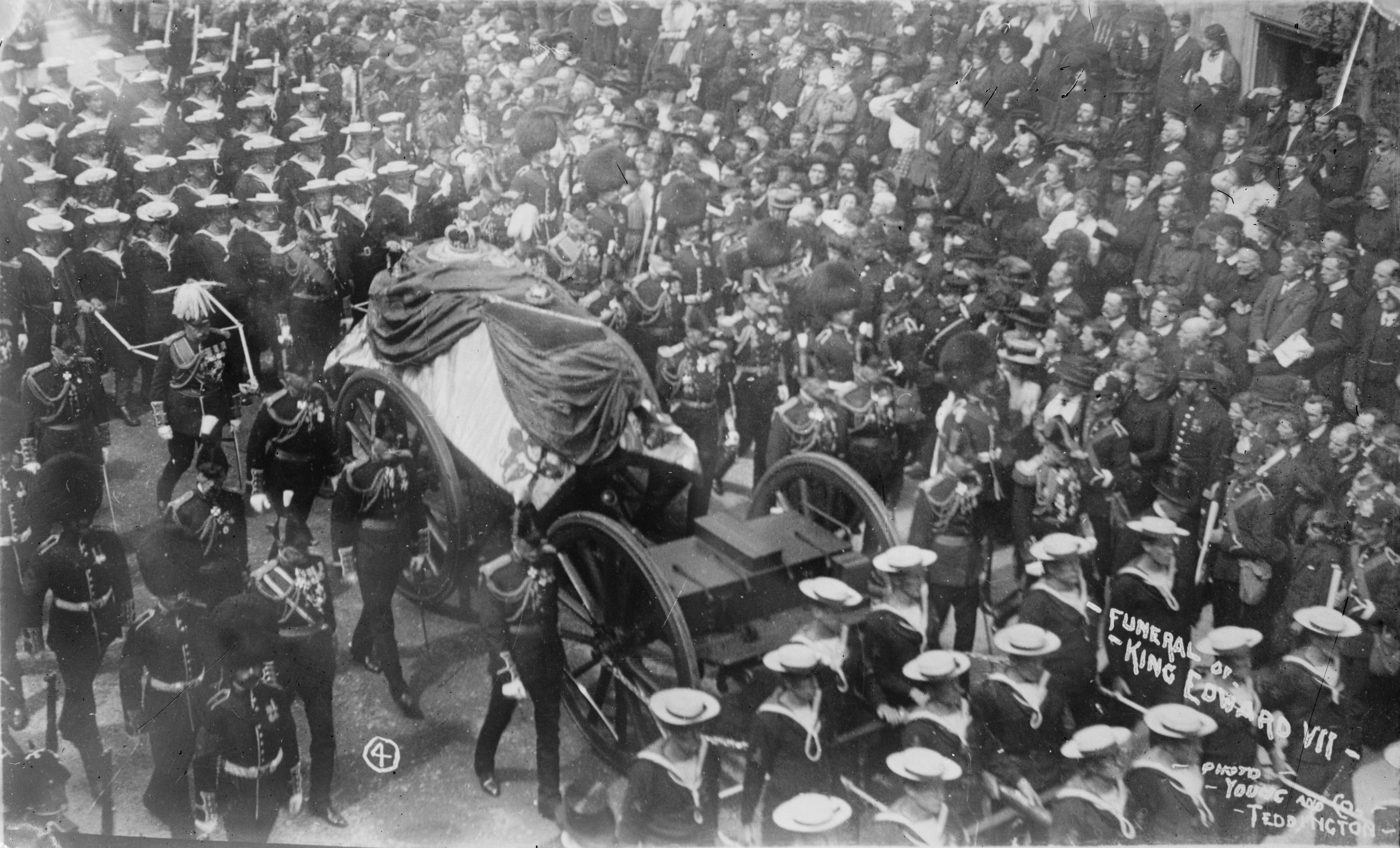
On a gun carriage Edward VII's coffin, covered with a white pall (on which the crown, orb and sceptre have been placed), being pulled through Windsor by sailors, flanked by his equerries and the bearer party of Grenadiers.

State funerals since have in many respects followed the template set by Queen Victoria, but with the public lying in state reinstated. (The use of Westminster Hall for this purpose immediately proved popular, with over a quarter of a million people taking the opportunity to file past the coffin in 1910; its use as the primary venue for lyings-in-state is now well-entrenched.) Even the unintended drawing of the hearse by a Royal Guard of sailors (from HMS Excellent) became tradition almost immediately when the royal coffin was further conveyed to the Royal Mausoleum at Frogmore two days later, at the command of King Edward, by means of the same naval detachment.

The use of Westminster Hall led to the establishment of another tradition: the practice of tolling Big Ben as the coffin left Westminster for Windsor on the day of the funeral, sounding as many strokes as there were years in the dead monarch's life. This was first done for King Edward VII, and repeated for George V, George VI and Elizabeth II.

The State procession for the funeral of Edward VII involved a very large number of foreign heads of state, together with royal and other representatives. Nine kings rode behind the coffin, and forty foreign princes; but pride of place behind the gun carriage was given to the late king's favourite fox terrier, Caesar (escorted by a highlander). Behind the dog walked the King Edward's charger, led riderless, with the late King's boots reversed in the stirrups. The main procession took two hours to get from Westminster Hall to Paddington station, where the mourners boarded the royal train, which took them (along with the King's body) to Windsor for the funeral. The same processional route was followed in 1936 and 1952, and on both occasions foreign kings and princes walked behind the coffin (albeit in diminishing numbers), accompanied by their suites and other foreign representatives; but this did not take place in 2022, when the funeral took place in Westminster Abbey.

One notable event at the lying-in-state of King George V was the so-called Vigil of the Princes: the four sons of the late king (King Edward VIII, the Duke of York, the Duke of Gloucester and the Duke of Kent) all stood guard together for a time. The vigil was recalled 66 years later at the lying-in-state of Queen Elizabeth the Queen Mother, with her grandsons the Prince of Wales, the Duke of York, the Earl of Wessex, and Viscount Linley taking post together. The four children of Elizabeth II stood guard at her lying in state twice: once in Edinburgh and once at Westminster; her eight grandchildren likewise stood vigil at her coffin during the lying in state in Westminster Hall.

An innovation following the death of Elizabeth II was the use of motor vehicles in the funeral processions. Throughout the 20th century, railway trains had been used to move the body of the deceased monarch to London and from there to Windsor; and at each location the coffin was transported using a gun carriage (and those accompanying it in procession, if not walking or riding, rode in horse-drawn carriages from the Royal Mews). In 2022, by contrast, an RAF aircraft took the Queen's body from Edinburgh to London, and a motor hearse was used for most of the journey to Windsor. Hearses had been used for private royal funerals since the 1930s, but this was the first time one had been used for a deceased monarch. Likewise, state cars were used in preference to carriages for the first time in the formal processions.

== Entitlement ==
The honour of a state funeral is usually reserved for the sovereign as head of state. A few historical civilians of profound achievement, exceptional military leaders, and outstanding statesmen have also been honoured with a full state funeral, including, for example, Sir Isaac Newton, Viscount Nelson, the Duke of Wellington, William Ewart Gladstone and Sir Winston Churchill. State funerals other than that of the monarch require an Act of Parliament to authorise the use of state funds to cover the cost of the funeral.

Many newspapers and individuals continue to speculate that the spouse of a monarch is entitled to a state funeral, however this is untrue and most spouses and widows of monarchs have received a Royal Ceremonial Funeral.

=== Distinguishing between a state funeral and a ceremonial funeral ===
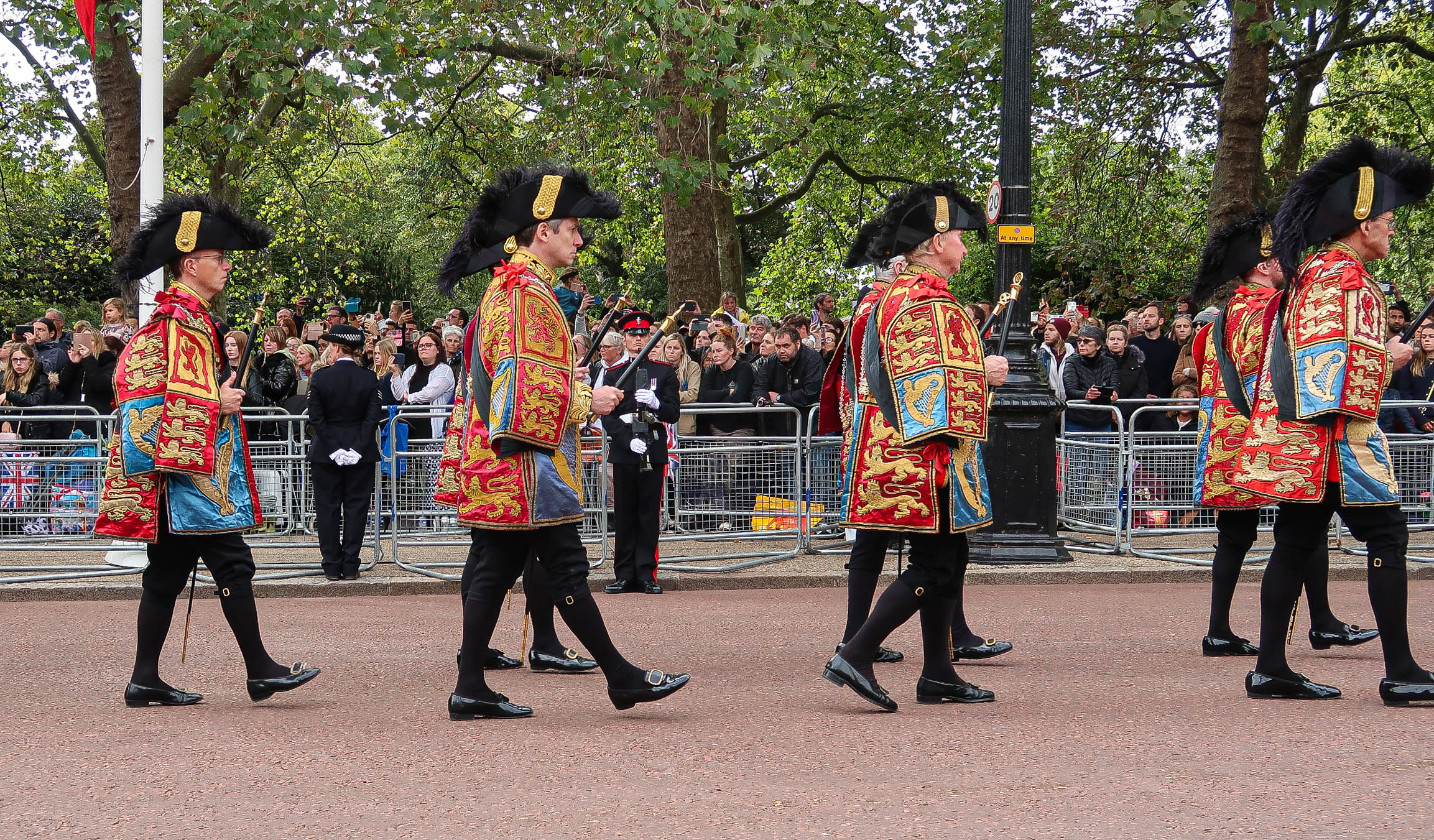
Heralds walking in the procession for the state funeral of Queen Elizabeth II, 2022.

Many of the features of a state funeral are shared by other types of funerals, and distinguishing between them is not easy. A ceremonial funeral, like a state funeral, often has a lying in state, a procession with a gun carriage and military contingents, and a funeral service attended by state representatives, both domestic and foreign. One clear distinction, however, is that state funerals (like coronations and the State Opening of Parliament) are organized and overseen by the Earl Marshal and his officers the Heralds, who are prominently placed ahead of the coffin in the procession. They are not so involved in royal ceremonial funerals, which are instead organized by the Lord Chamberlain. (The Lord Chamberlain is a Great Officer of the Household, whereas the Earl Marshal is a Great Officer of State.)

The visual distinction usually referred to is that in a state funeral, the gun carriage bearing the coffin is drawn by sailors from the Royal Navy rather than horses. This distinguishing feature is not invariable, however, as shown by the use of naval ratings rather than horses at the ceremonial funeral for Lord Mountbatten in 1979 (one of a number of features on that occasion which emphasized Mountbatten's lifelong links with the Royal Navy).

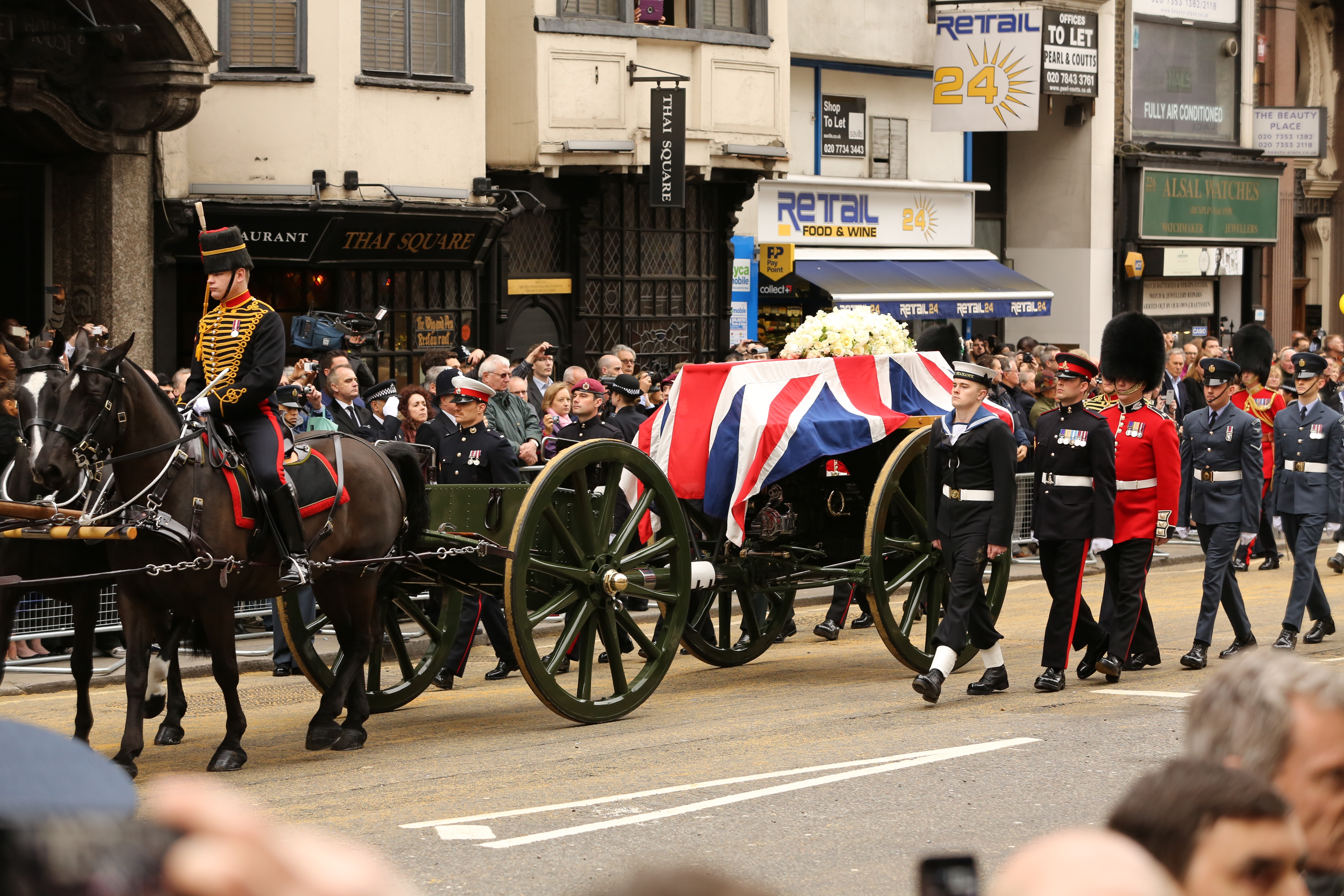
Horse-drawn gun carriage used for the ceremonial funeral of Margaret Thatcher.

Another distinction made between a state funeral and a ceremonial funeral is that a state funeral for a distinguished subject requires a message from the Sovereign to each of the Houses of Parliament, under the royal sign manual, informing them of the funeral and inviting their attendance. In the case of the state funeral for a deceased Sovereign, a message from the Earl Marshal, acting at the new Sovereign's command, informs the Houses of Parliament of the arrangements for the funeral and requires their attendance at the lying-in-state. Ceremonial funerals do not require such formal invitation of the Houses of Parliament by the Sovereign. Ceremonial funerals on the death of a member of the Royal Family are preceded by the approval of a motion in each House of Parliament directing that an address of condolence be presented on behalf of the House to the Sovereign. But such addresses are usual for the deaths of all members of the Royal Family, and are therefore moved even for deceased members of the Royal Family who will have private funerals. In the case of a state funeral for a distinguished subject, the parliamentary address takes a different format, because it is moved in reply to the Sovereign's message informing Parliament of the decision to hold a state funeral, and in this case the address thanks the monarch for the decision to hold a state funeral and for all arrangements made, and expresses Parliament's participation in the national grief. In the case of a state funeral for a deceased Sovereign, the new monarch writes a message to each House of Parliament a few days after his/her accession (and after the delivery to Parliament of the Earl Marshal's message regarding practical arrangements for the funeral), mentioning the demise of the late Sovereign and expressing his/her sentiments for the new reign, and both Houses of Parliament then reply with addresses expressing condolence for the death of the late monarch and assuring the new Sovereign of their allegiance.

== List of state, royal and ceremonial funerals ==
=== Members of the Royal Family ===
==== State funerals ====
Year	Funeral of	Funeral	Committal
1558	Queen Mary I	Westminster Abbey	
1603	Queen Elizabeth I	Westminster Abbey	
1625	King James VI & I	Westminster Abbey	
1685	King Charles II	Westminster Abbey	
1695	Queen Mary II	Westminster Abbey	
1702	King William III & II	Westminster Abbey	
1714	Queen Anne	Westminster Abbey	
1760	King George II	Westminster Abbey	
1820	King George III	St George's Chapel, Windsor	
1830	King George IV	St George's Chapel, Windsor	
1837	King William IV	St George's Chapel, Windsor	
1901	Queen Victoria	St George's Chapel, Windsor	Royal Mausoleum, Frogmore
1910	King Edward VII	St George's Chapel, Windsor	
1936	King George V	St George's Chapel, Windsor	
1952	King George VI	St George's Chapel, Windsor	
2022	Queen Elizabeth II	Westminster Abbey	St George's Chapel, Windsor

==== Ceremonial funerals ====
Year	Funeral of	Funeral	Committal
1619	Queen Anne	Westminster Abbey	
1660	The Duke of Gloucester	Westminster Abbey	
1660	The Princess Royal	Westminster Abbey	
1661	The Duke of Cambridge	Westminster Abbey	
1662	The Dowager Electress Palatine	Westminster Abbey	
1667	The Duke of Kendal	Westminster Abbey	
1667	The Duke of Cambridge	Westminster Abbey	
1682	The Duke of Cumberland	Westminster Abbey	
1700	The Duke of Gloucester	Westminster Abbey	
1708	The Duke of Cumberland	Westminster Abbey	
1737	Queen Caroline	Westminster Abbey	
1751	The Prince of Wales	Westminster Abbey	
1758	Princess Caroline	Westminster Abbey	
1759	Princess Elizabeth	Westminster Abbey	
1765	The Duke of Cumberland	Westminster Abbey	
1766	Prince Frederick	Westminster Abbey	
1767	The Duke of York and Albany	Westminster Abbey	
1768	Princess Louisa	Westminster Abbey	
1772	The Dowager Princess of Wales	Westminster Abbey	
1786	The Princess Amelia	Westminster Abbey	
1790	The Duke of Cumberland and Strathearn	Westminster Abbey	
1805	The Duke of Gloucester and Edinburgh	St George's Chapel, Windsor	
1810	The Princess Amelia	St George's Chapel, Windsor	
1813	The Duchess of Brunswick	St George's Chapel, Windsor	
1817	Princess Charlotte of Wales	St George's Chapel, Windsor	
1818	Queen Charlotte	St George's Chapel, Windsor	
1820	The Duke of Kent and Strathearn	St George's Chapel, Windsor	
1820	The Duchess of York and Albany	St James's Church, Weybridge	
1827	The Duke of York and Albany	St George's Chapel, Windsor	
1834	The Duke of Gloucester and Edinburgh	St George's Chapel, Windsor	
1840	The Princess Augusta Sophia	St George's Chapel, Windsor	
1843	The Duke of Sussex	Kensal Green Cemetery	
1844	Princess Sophia of Gloucester	St George's Chapel, Windsor	
1848	The Princess Sophia	Kensal Green Cemetery	
1849	Queen Adelaide	St George's Chapel, Windsor	
1850	The Duke of Cambridge	St Anne's Church, Kew	St Anne's Church, Kew (transferred to St George's Chapel, Windsor in 1930)
1857	The Duchess of Gloucester and Edinburgh	St George's Chapel, Windsor	
1861	The Duchess of Kent and Strathearn	St George's Chapel, Windsor	Duchess of Kent's Mausoleum
1861	The Prince Consort	St George's Chapel, Windsor	Royal Mausoleum, Frogmore
1878	King George V of Hanover	St George's Chapel, Windsor	
1884	The Duke of Albany	St George's Chapel, Windsor	
1889	The Duchess of Cambridge	St Anne's Church, Kew	St Anne's Church, Kew (transferred to St George's Chapel, Windsor in 1930)
1892	The Duke of Clarence and Avondale	St George's Chapel, Windsor	
1896	Prince Henry of Battenberg	St Mildred's Church, Whippingham	
1897	The Duchess of Teck	St George's Chapel, Windsor	
1900	The Duke of Teck	St George's Chapel, Windsor	
1904	The Duke of Cambridge	Westminster Abbey	Kensal Green Cemetery
1921	The Marquess of Milford Haven	Westminster Abbey	St Mildred's Church, Whippingham
1925	Queen Alexandra	Westminster Abbey	St George's Chapel, Windsor
1953	Queen Mary	St George's Chapel, Windsor	
1974	The Duke of Gloucester	St George's Chapel, Windsor	Royal Burial Ground, Frogmore
1979	The Earl Mountbatten of Burma	Westminster Abbey	Romsey Abbey
1997	Diana, Princess of Wales	Westminster Abbey	Althorp
2002	Queen Elizabeth the Queen Mother	Westminster Abbey	St George's Chapel, Windsor
2015	King Richard III (exhumation and reburial)	Leicester Cathedral	
2021	The Duke of Edinburgh	St George's Chapel, Windsor	

==== Private funerals since 1910 ====
Year	Funeral of	Funeral	Committal
1910	Prince Francis of Teck	St George's Chapel, Windsor	St George's Chapel, Windsor (transferred to Royal Burial Ground, Frogmore in 1928)
1912	The Duke of Fife	St George's Chapel, Windsor	St George's Chapel, Windsor (transferred to St Ninian's Chapel, Braemar later that year)
1914	The Duke of Argyll	Kilmun Parish Church and Argyll Mausoleum	
1917	The Duchess of Connaught and Strathearn	St George's Chapel, Windsor	St George's Chapel, Windsor after cremation at Golders Green Crematorium (ashes transferred to Royal Burial Ground, Frogmore in 1928)
1917	Prince Christian of Schleswig-Holstein	St George's Chapel, Windsor	St George's Chapel, Windsor (transferred to Royal Burial Ground, Frogmore in 1928)
1919	The Prince John	St Mary Magdalene Church, Sandringham	
1922	Lord Leopold Mountbatten	St George's Chapel, Windsor	St George's Chapel, Windsor (both transferred to Royal Burial Ground, Frogmore in 1928)
1923	Princess Christian	St George's Chapel, Windsor	St George's Chapel, Windsor (both transferred to Royal Burial Ground, Frogmore in 1928)
1926	Princess Frederica of Hanover	St George's Chapel, Windsor	St George's Chapel, Windsor
1928	The Marquess of Cambridge	St George's Chapel, Windsor	St George's Chapel, Windsor (both transferred to Royal Burial Ground, Frogmore in 1928)
1928	Viscount Trematon	St George's Chapel, Windsor	St George's Chapel, Windsor (both transferred to Royal Burial Ground, Frogmore in 1928)
1929	The Marchioness of Cambridge	St George's Chapel, Windsor	Royal Burial Ground, Frogmore
1931	The Princess Royal	St George's Chapel, Windsor	St Ninian's Chapel, Braemar
1935	The Princess Victoria	St George's Chapel, Windsor	Royal Burial Ground, Frogmore
1938	The Marquess of Milford Haven	St Michael's Church, Bray	Bray Cemetery
1938	Prince Arthur of Connaught	St George's Chapel, Windsor	Royal Burial Ground, Frogmore
1939	The Princess Louise, Duchess of Argyll	St George's Chapel, Windsor	Royal Burial Ground, Frogmore
1940	Lord Frederick Cambridge		Heverlee War Cemetery
1942	The Duke of Connaught and Strathearn	St George's Chapel, Windsor	Royal Burial Ground, Frogmore
1942	The Duke of Kent	St George's Chapel, Windsor	Royal Burial Ground, Frogmore
1943	The Duke of Connaught and Strathearn	St Ninian's Chapel, Braemar	
1944	The Princess Beatrice	St George's Chapel, Windsor	St Mildred's Church, Whippingham
1945	The Countess of Southesk	Kinnaird Castle, Brechin	
1947	The Earl of Harewood	All Saints' Church, Harewood	
1948	Princess Helena Victoria	St George's Chapel, Windsor	Royal Burial Ground, Frogmore
1950	The Marchioness of Milford Haven	St Mildred's Church, Whippingham	
1956	The Marchioness of Carisbrooke	St Mildred's Church, Whippingham	
1956	Princess Marie Louise	St George's Chapel, Windsor	Royal Burial Ground, Frogmore
1957	The Earl of Athlone	St George's Chapel, Windsor	Royal Burial Ground, Frogmore
1959	Princess Arthur of Connaught, Duchess of Fife	St Ninian's Chapel, Braemar	
1960	The Countess Mountbatten of Burma	Romsey Abbey	Portsmouth (body buried at sea)
1960	The Marquess of Carisbrooke	St Mildred's Church, Whippingham	
1963	The Marchioness of Milford Haven	St Michael's Church, Bray	Bray Cemetery
1965	The Princess Royal	York Minster	All Saints' Church, Harewood
1968	Princess Marina, Duchess of Kent	St George's Chapel, Windsor	Royal Burial Ground, Frogmore
1969	Princess Andrew of Greece and Denmark	St George's Chapel, Windsor	St George's Chapel, Windsor (transferred to Church of Mary Magdalene, Jerusalem, in 1988)
1969	Lady Helena Gibbs	Church of St Mary the Virgin, Tetbury	Church of St John the Baptist, Shipton Moyne
1970	The Marquess of Milford Haven	Golders Green Crematorium	St Mildred's Church, Whippingham
1972	The Duke of Windsor (Note: The former King Edward VIII had opted for a private royal funeral, rather than a full state funeral, with the exception that Garter King of Arms recited words reserved for the deceased sovereign – a feature of a state funeral.)	St George's Chapel, Windsor	Royal Burial Ground, Frogmore
1972	Prince William of Gloucester	St George's Chapel, Windsor	Royal Burial Ground, Frogmore
1972	Sir Alexander Ramsay	St George's Chapel, Windsor	Royal Burial Ground, Frogmore
1974	Lady Patricia Ramsay	St George's Chapel, Windsor	Royal Burial Ground, Frogmore
1981	Princess Alice, Countess of Athlone	St George's Chapel, Windsor	Royal Burial Ground, Frogmore
1981	The Marquess of Cambridge	St George's Chapel, Windsor	Royal Burial Ground, Frogmore
1982	Lady Iris Kemp	St. Paul's, Bloor Street, Toronto, Ontario	St Mildred's Church, Whippingham
1984	The Duke of Beaufort	St Michael and All Angels Church, Badminton	
1986	The Duchess of Windsor	St George's Chapel, Windsor	Royal Burial Ground, Frogmore
1987	The Duchess of Beaufort	St Michael and All Angels Church, Badminton	
1988	The Marchioness of Cambridge	St George's Chapel, Windsor	Royal Burial Ground, Frogmore
1993	Sir Henry Abel Smith	St George's Chapel, Windsor	Royal Burial Ground, Frogmore
1994	Lady May Abel Smith	St George's Chapel, Windsor	Royal Burial Ground, Frogmore
1998	The Hon. Gerald Lascelles	All Saints' Church, Harewood	
1999	Lady Mary Whitley	St Mary's Church, Stogumber	
2000	Captain Alexander Ramsay of Mar	St Peter's Episcopal Church, Aberdeenshire	
2002	The Princess Margaret, Countess of Snowdon	St George's Chapel, Windsor	St George's Chapel, Windsor (ashes)
2004	Princess Alice, Duchess of Gloucester	St George's Chapel, Windsor	Royal Burial Ground, Frogmore
2005	Sir Angus Ogilvy	St George's Chapel, Windsor	Royal Burial Ground, Frogmore
2007	The Lord Brabourne	St John the Baptist Church, Mersham	
2011	The Earl of Harewood	Harewood House	All Saints' Church, Harewood
2015	The Duke of Fife	St Andrew’s Episcopal Church, Brechin, Angus	Kinnaird Castle, Brechin
2017	The Countess Mountbatten of Burma	St Paul's Church, Knightsbridge	St John the Baptist Church, Mersham
2024	The Lady Saltoun	St Peter's Episcopal Church, Aberdeenshire	
2025	The Duchess of Kent	Westminster Cathedral	Royal Burial Ground, Frogmore
2026	The Lady Pamela Hicks	St Bartholomew's Church in Brightwell Baldwin, Oxfordshire	Brightwell Baldwin, Oxfordshire

=== Outside the Royal Family ===
==== State funerals ====
Several other notable people and former prime ministers have been awarded a full state funeral: (Some of the following may not have been state funerals in the strictest sense of the term, even though some sources refer to them as such.)

Year	Funeral of	Funeral	Committal
1657	Admiral Robert Blake	Westminster Abbey during Commonwealth; exhumed after the Restoration and reburied in St Margaret's churchyard	
1727	Sir Isaac Newton	Westminster Abbey	
1759	George Frideric Handel	Westminster Abbey	
1806	The Viscount Nelson	St Paul's Cathedral	
1852	The Duke of Wellington	St Paul's Cathedral	
1865	The Viscount Palmerston	Westminster Abbey	
1890	The Lord Napier of Magdala	St Paul's Cathedral	
1898	William Ewart Gladstone	Westminster Abbey	
1914	The Earl Roberts	St Paul's Cathedral	
1919	Edith Cavell	Westminster Abbey	Norwich Cathedral
1920	The Unknown Warrior	Westminster Abbey	
1928	The Earl Haig	Westminster Abbey	Dryburgh Abbey
1935	The Lord Carson	St Anne's Cathedral, Belfast	
1965	Sir Winston Churchill	St Paul's Cathedral	St Martin's Church, Bladon

==== Ceremonial funerals ====
Year	Funeral of	Funeral	Committal
1778	The Earl of Chatham	Westminster Abbey	
1806	William Pitt the Younger	Westminster Abbey	
1919	The Lord Beresford	St Paul's Cathedral	Putney Vale Cemetery, London
1920	The Lord Fisher	Westminster Abbey	Kilverstone, Norfolk (ashes)
1925	The Earl of Ypres	Westminster Abbey	Ripple, Kent (ashes)
1935	The Earl Jellicoe	St Paul's Cathedral	
1936	The Earl Beatty	St Paul's Cathedral	
1943	Sir Dudley Pound	Westminster Abbey	Portsmouth (ashes buried at sea)
1950	The Earl Wavell	Westminster Abbey	Winchester College
1963	The Viscount Alanbrooke	St George's Chapel	Hartley Wintney, Hampshire
1976	The Viscount Montgomery of Alamein	St George's Chapel	Binsted, Hampshire
2013	The Baroness Thatcher	St Paul's Cathedral	Royal Hospital Chelsea, London (ashes)

==== Offers of state funerals ====
- 1881: Upon his death, the estate of Benjamin Disraeli was offered a state funeral by William Ewart Gladstone, Prime Minister at the time. In his will Disraeli had made it clear that he did not want a state funeral and that he wanted to be buried in St Michael and All Angels Church, Hughenden next to his wife. There was later a memorial service in Westminster Abbey.
- 1910: The famous nurse and statistician Florence Nightingale was offered a state funeral, but her family opted for a private ceremony.
- 2013: There was some speculation at the time of her death that Margaret Thatcher would be accorded a state funeral, but the government announced that she would not receive a state funeral "in accordance with her own wishes". Instead, she was accorded a ceremonial funeral with full military honours at St Paul's Cathedral, as authorised by Queen Elizabeth II.

==== Devolved administrations ====
There is no formalised process or convention for how the devolved administrations in Scotland, Wales, or Northern Ireland commemorate important figures. The deaths of Ian Paisley and Martin McGuinness were privately commemorated, reflecting political and religious sensitivities in Northern Ireland. In Scotland, the funeral of Donald Dewar in 2000, the serving First Minister of Scotland at the time of his death, was a national event and considered to be a state funeral. His funeral at Glasgow Cathedral was televised and attended by a large number of prominent UK political figures, as well as the Irish Taoiseach and the Prince of Wales. In 2017, the Welsh Government organised a humanist funeral for former First Minister Rhodri Morgan at the National Assembly for Wales, which was televised and billed as a major national event.

== See also ==
- Funeral directors to the Royal Household
