= Death and funeral of Alexandra of Denmark =

Death and funeral of Queen Alexandra
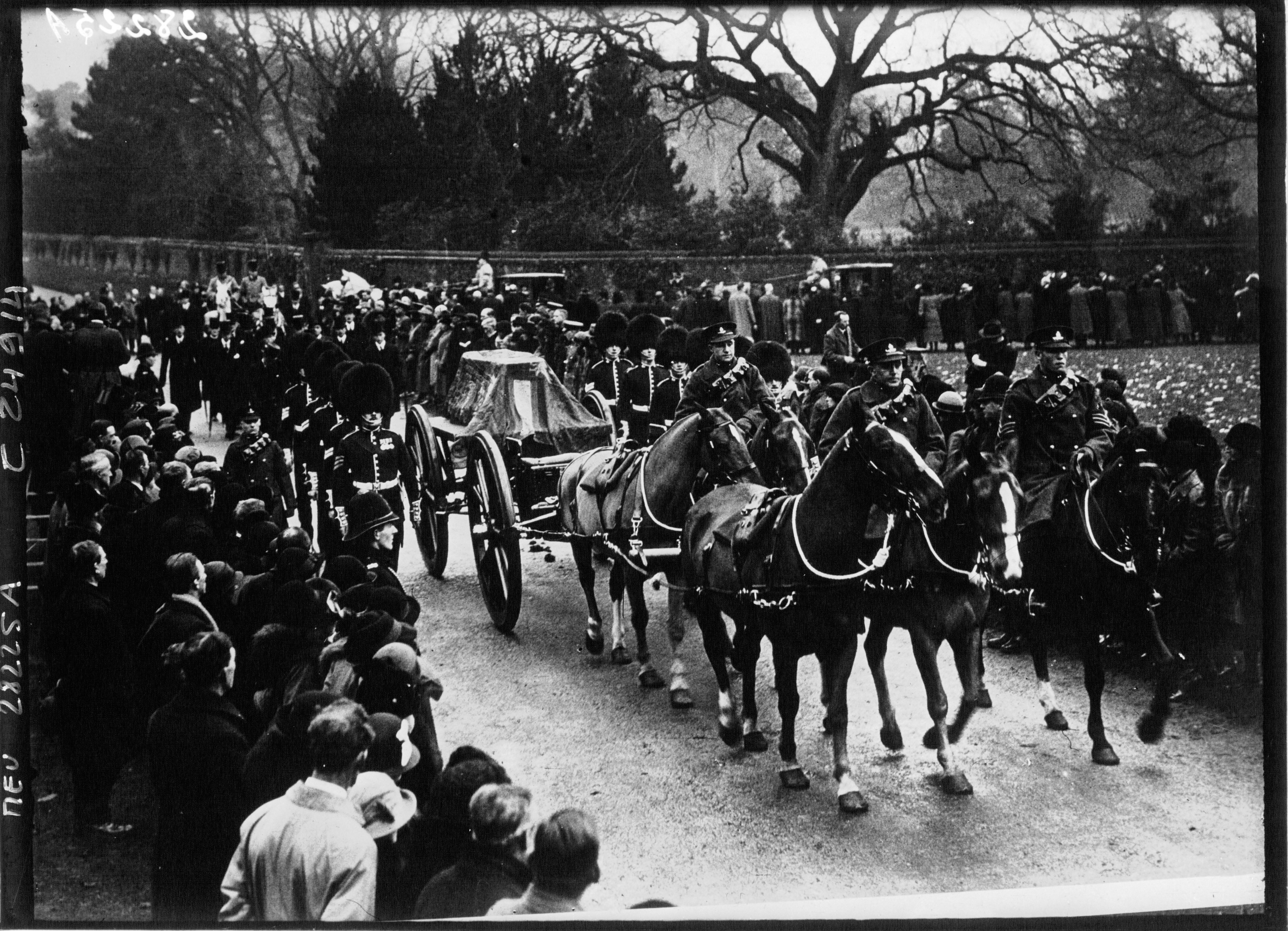
- The funeral procession in Sandringham. Her coffin was draped in her personal banner of arms.
- Date: 20 November 1925; (death); 27 November 1925; (funeral)
- Location: Sandringham House; (place of death); Westminster Abbey; (funeral and lying in state)
- Participants: British royal family

The funeral of Queen Alexandra (formerly Princess Alexandra of Denmark), widow to King Edward VII and mother to King George V, occurred on Friday, 27 November 1925 at Westminster Abbey, following her death on 20 November.

== Background ==
Alexandra appeared youthful even in her senior years, but during the First World War her age caught up with her. She made no more visits to foreign countries, and her health gradually deteriorated. In 1920, a blood vessel in her eye burst, leaving her with temporary partial blindness. Towards the end of her life, her memory and speech became impaired.

== Death ==
A day before her death, Alexandra reportedly suffered a seizure at 11:00 am. By 1:00 pm on 20 November, members of her family – including her three daughters (the Queen of Norway, the Princess Royal, and Princess Victoria) and her grandson Prince Henry – had arrived, after which she became unconscious. By 4:15 pm she was administered oxygen but continued to lose strength. She died on 20 November 1925 at Sandringham House at 5:25 pm from a heart attack. Her son King George V, her daughter-in-law Queen Mary, and other members of the royal family were by her side. Her two eldest grandsons, the Prince of Wales and the Duke of York, were on a train to Sandringham and arrived at 6:45 pm. Flags flew at half-mast following the announcement of her death, except at Windsor Castle where the Union Jack flew high as it could only be lowered when a sovereign had died. Shows involving music and dance were cancelled by the West End hotels in London and the BBC interrupted its regular programmes. Prime Minister Stanley Baldwin brought forward a motion of condolence in the House of Commons, which was agreed to by the Leader of the Opposition Ramsay MacDonald. The Grenadier Guards marched in the Horse Guards Parade with their colours draped.

== Processions and funeral ==
After her death, Alexandra's coffin lay in St Mary Magdalene Church, Sandringham, before being moved to the Chapel Royal in St James' Palace. A simple service was also held at the church in Sandringham, attended by members of the royal family and the villagers. Mourners also filed past the coffin. Her coffin, draped in her personal banner of arms, was taken in a procession in Sandringham to Wolferton railway station. The King and Queen, the Prince of Wales, the Duke of York, and other mourners, including Princess George of Greece and Denmark, followed the coffin, while estate employees and villagers also eventually joined in on the procession.

In London, the procession went from St James' Palace to Westminster Abbey and the whole route was lined with military personnel. Areas the coffin passed by included The Mall, Horse Guards Parade, and Whitehall. Detachments from different regiments took part in the procession as the gun carriage on which the coffin was placed made its way to abbey amid the sound of gun salutes. Walking behind the coffin were the King (in a Field Marshal's uniform), the King of the Belgians, the King of Denmark (Queen Alexandra's nephew), the King of Norway (Queen Alexandra's nephew and son-in-law), the Prince of Wales (in the uniform of a Colonel of the Welsh Guards), the Crown Prince of Norway (Queen Alexandra's grandson), the Crown Prince of Romania (Queen Alexandra's grandnephew), the Crown Prince of Sweden, the Duke of York, Prince Valdemar of Denmark (Queen Alexandra's brother), Prince Henry, Prince Arthur of Connaught (Queen Alexandra's nephew and grandson-in-law), and Lord Louis Mountbatten (Queen Alexandra's grandnephew). The Queen, the Queen of Norway, the Queen of Spain (Queen Alexandra's niece), and royal princesses travelled straight to the abbey. Pallbearers were chosen from the King's Company of Grenadiers. Her funeral was held at the abbey on 27 November 1925 at 11:30 am. The funeral service was conducted by the Archbishop of Canterbury. Among the attendees were cabinet members, diplomats and high commissioners. Other attendees included Queen Alexandra's nephews Prince George of Greece and Denmark and Prince Axel of Denmark. The order of service included Psalm 23, hymns such as "Now the Laborer's Task is O'er" and "On the Resurrection Morning", and the anthem "Give Rest, O Christ".

On the day of the funeral, BBC radio stations broadcast as usual until 6pm, closed down for an hour, broadcast news and weather at 7pm, and then closed for another hour. They then broadcast sombre music until 9pm, when they closed for the night, without the usual 9pm news bulletin. The funeral ceremony was not officially gazetted, in keeping with the policy established in 1910 of excluding royal funerals from the official public record, except for those of reigning monarchs.

== Lying-in-state and burial ==
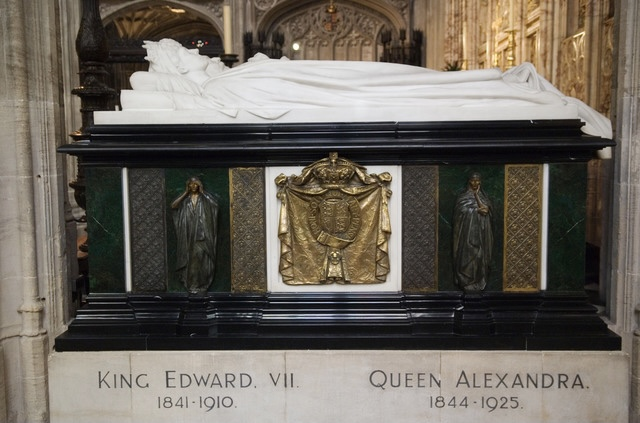
Tomb of King Edward VII and Queen Alexandra

After the funeral service, the coffin was watched by the Honourable Corps of Gentlemen at Arms and the Yeomen of the Guard, who had also stood vigil at St James' Palace. Alexandra lay in state at the abbey, where members of the public were allowed to enter and file past on 27 November to pay their respects. Additional memorial services were held at churches across the country, while theatres and dance halls were closed. In Australia, memorial services were also held at St David's Cathedral, Hobart, St Paul's Cathedral, Melbourne, and St John's Cathedral, Brisbane. On 28 November, her coffin was taken to Windsor for a private service in the evening, where it was placed together with her late husband's coffin in front of the altar in the Albert Memorial Chapel. On 29 November, members of the public visited Windsor to view the floral tributes left out for Alexandra.

After Alexandra's husband, Edward VII, had died, his body had been temporarily interred in the Royal Vault at Windsor under the Albert Memorial Chapel. On the instructions of Alexandra in 1919, a monument in the South Aisle was designed and executed by Bertram Mackennal, featuring tomb effigies of Edward and Alexandra in white marble mounted on a black and green marble sarcophagus, where both bodies were interred two years after Alexandra's death on 22 April 1927. The monument includes a depiction of Edward's favourite dog, Caesar, lying at his feet.

Following Alexandra's funeral, George V awarded members of her foreign family and those involved in the funeral ceremony various honours, including the GCVO and Royal Victorian Medal. In the weeks and months that followed, further honours were granted to Alexandra's household staff, nurse, pallbearers, private secretary, equerry, and rector in recognition of their service to her during her final years and funeral.

Alexandra's great-granddaughter Princess Elizabeth Alexandra Mary of York (later Queen Elizabeth II), who was born five months after Alexandra's death, was named after her.
