= State hearse =

Funeral vehicle used by the British Royal family

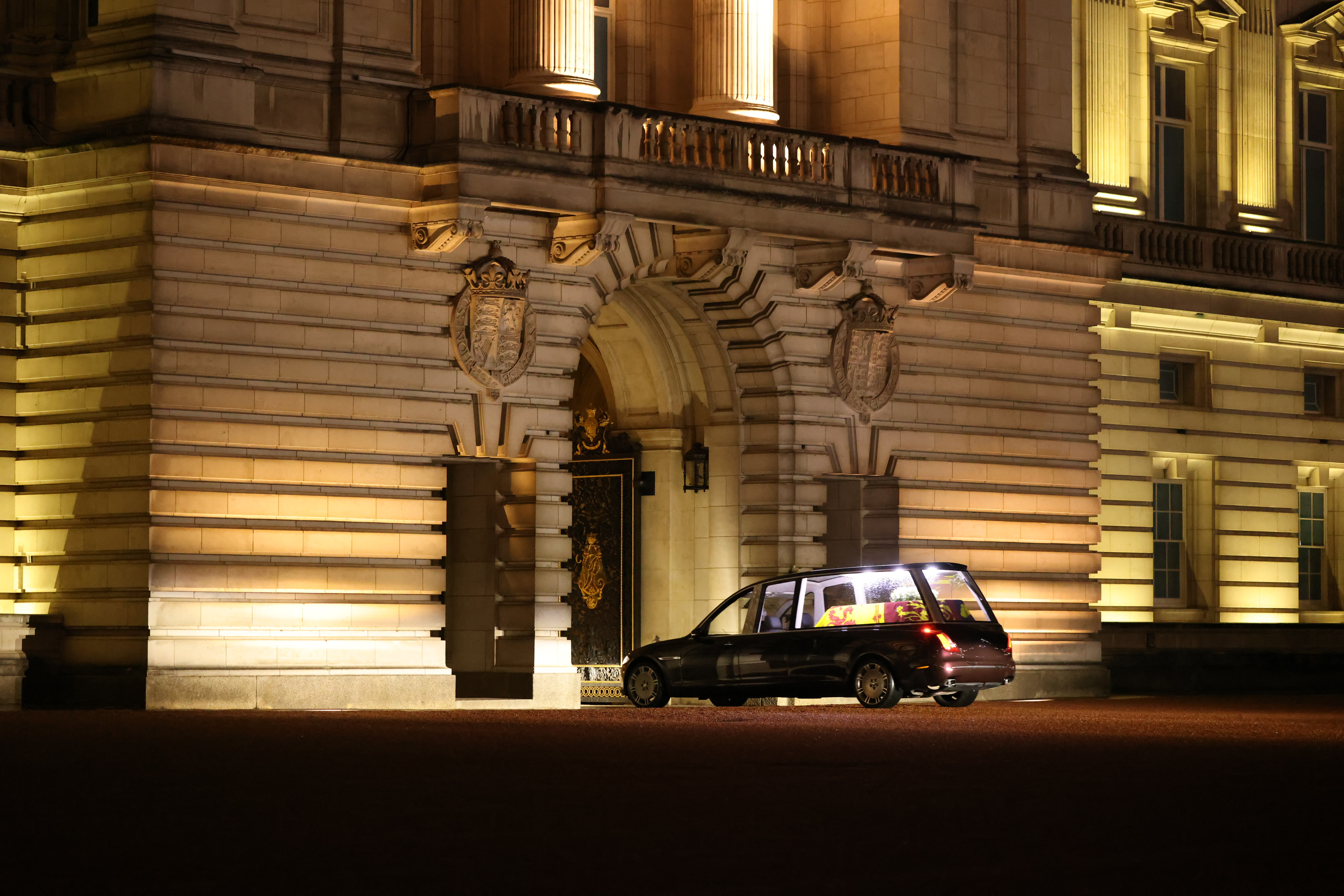
The state hearse carrying the coffin of Elizabeth II arriving at Buckingham Palace.

The state hearse is a vehicle of the Royal Mews used for funerals of the British royal family. Based on a Jaguar XJ model, it was designed by the Royal Household and Jaguar Land Rover with the input of and approval from Elizabeth II and converted by UK-Based coachbuilder Wilcox Limousines. It was first used on 13 September 2022 to transport Queen Elizabeth II's coffin from RAF Northolt to London ahead of her lying-in-state.

== Design ==
The state hearse was designed by Jaguar Land Rover in collaboration with the Royal Household. The hearse is based on a Jaguar XJ (X351) saloon. Its conversion from the standard model was made by Wilcox Limousines.

The hearse has large side and back windows and a glass roof to maximise the coffin's visibility to onlookers. It also features three internal spotlights along one side of the roof to illuminate the coffin, which is on a raised platform. The design of the car is unique. The roof pillars are thinner than in a standard model and the roof is higher.

The hearse has royal claret coloured paint with red pinstripe details, which matches other vehicles operated by the Royal Mews. As a state vehicle it has no registration plates. Jaguar's "grinner" badge of a jaguar's face is on the front grille and their "leaper" badge of a jumping animal on the rear panel. Each side featured below the window the Queen's personal royal cypher, an elegant "E" standing for just "Elizabeth" surmounted by St Edward's Crown, instead of her cypher as Queen, "EIIR" (Elizabeth II Regina).

There is a mount for a mascot at the front of the bonnet; when used to carry the coffin of the late Queen Elizabeth II in 2022, it displayed her silver-plated bronze mascot depicting Saint George slaying the dragon on 13 September, and her parents' mascot (depicting Britannia atop a globe) on 19 September.

Queen Elizabeth II approved the final plans for the design of the hearse.

Since the funeral of Katharine, Duchess of Kent in 2025, the cypher has been replaced by the heraldic badge of the royal family.

== Use ==
The state hearse was first used on 13 September 2022 to transport the coffin of Elizabeth II from RAF Northolt to Buckingham Palace. It was then used on 19 September 2022 to transport the coffin from London's Wellington Arch to St George's Chapel, Windsor Castle for her committal service.

It was used again on 15 and 16 September 2025 to transport the coffin of Katharine, Duchess of Kent from Kensington Palace to Westminster Cathedral, the day ahead of the Requiem Mass and from Westminster Cathedral to the Royal Burial Ground, Frogmore, after the Requiem Mass.

== Predecessors ==
Previous royal hearses have included a Jaguar XJ used for the funeral of Queen Elizabeth, the Queen Mother and a custom built open top Land Rover Defender for the funeral of Prince Philip, Duke of Edinburgh.

== See also ==
- Ceremonial and state funerals in the United Kingdom
- Funeral directors to the Royal Household
