= Death and funeral of Mary of Teck =

Death and funeral of Queen Mary
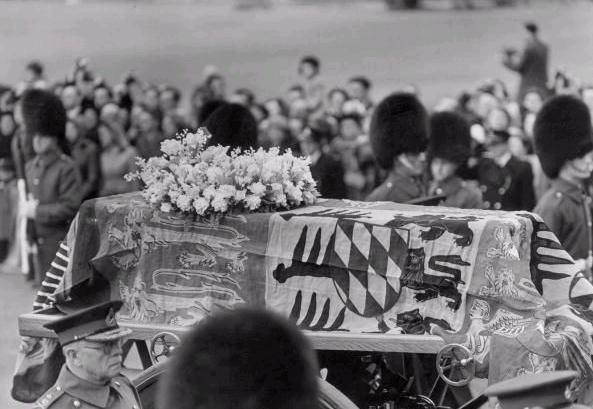
- Queen Mary's funeral carriage. Her coffin was draped in her personal banner of arms.
- Date: 24 March 1953; (death); 31 March 1953; (funeral)
- Location: Marlborough House; (place of death); Westminster Hall; (lying in state); St George's Chapel, Windsor Castle; (official ceremony)
- Participants: British royal family

Queen Mary (born Princess Victoria Mary of Teck), a dowager queen of the United Kingdom, died on 24 March 1953. A ceremonial funeral was held on 31 March 1953 at St George's Chapel, Windsor Castle following a lying in state at Westminster Hall. Her death occurred two months short of her 86th birthday and ten weeks before the coronation of her granddaughter, Queen Elizabeth II.

== Background ==
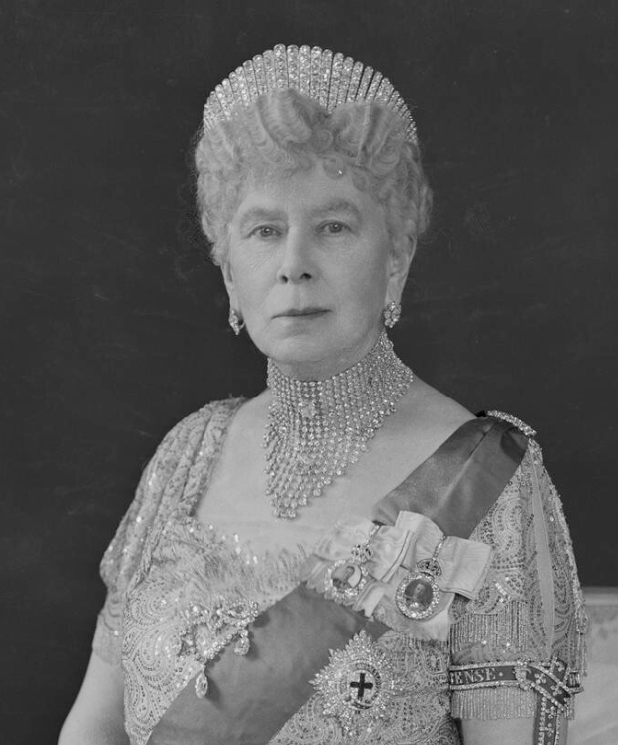
Queen Mary in 1947

In her final year, Queen Mary was profoundly affected by the death of her son King George VI, the third of her children to predecease her. She had been suffering from a gastric illness for some time and by the time of her death had been confined to bed for a month. It was reported in the press that those close to her felt that in her final month she was more accepting of the reality of her condition and felt she had fulfilled her goal of preserving the monarchy and her life was coming to a natural end. The curtains in her room were also drawn, as she complained about the light in her eyes.

== Death ==
Mary reportedly had a haemorrhage on 24 March 1953. A bulletin released at Marlborough House at 11:40 am announced that there were concerns for her health condition. A second bulletin at 1:40 pm stated that her condition had "become more grave" and there was "a serious weakening of the heart action". At 7:00 pm, it was announced that Mary was losing strength but "sleeping peacefully". She died in her sleep at Marlborough House at 10:20 pm. The announcement, put out at 11:15 pm, was signed by Sir Horace Evans and Lord Webb-Johnson. Her daughter, the Princess Royal, was by her side. Her eldest son, the Duke of Windsor, had visited her twice during the day, and returned to Marlborough House for a third time ten minutes after his mother's death. Both the Princess Royal and the Duke of Windsor had cut short their holidays in the United States and the West Indies as their mother's condition worsened. Mary's other surviving son, the Duke of Gloucester; her granddaughters Queen Elizabeth II and Princess Margaret; her daughter-in-law Queen Elizabeth the Queen Mother; and other members of the royal family also visited her on her final day. The Queen and the Duke of Edinburgh, the Duke of Windsor, the Queen Mother, Princess Margaret, the Duke and Duchess of Gloucester, Princess Marina, Duchess of Kent, the Duke of Kent, and Princess Alexandra all visited Marlborough House on the following day. A spokesperson for the Duchess of Windsor, who had not accompanied her husband to Britain, stated that she was "very distressed".

Although publicly the cause of death was given as gastric problems, it was later reported in the press that she had died of lung cancer.

== Reactions ==
Following the announcement, Mary's banner of arms which flew over Marlborough House was lowered. Flags flew at half-mast on government buildings and warships in Britain and across other countries in the Commonwealth until after the funeral. Prime Minister Winston Churchill informed the House of Commons of her death shortly before 11:15 pm. Tributes were also paid at the Federal Parliament of Australia. Messages of condolence were also issued by Pope Pius XII, the King of Sweden, U.S. president Dwight D. Eisenhower, French president Vincent Auriol, German president Theodor Heuss, South Korean president Syngman Rhee, and British Commonwealth ambassadors and other officials. The BBC interrupted the Light and Third programmes at 11:25 pm to announce her demise. No further programmes were broadcast afterwards, except for news and weather forecasts. The day after her death, courts and the London Stock Exchange observed a short silence before starting business. In the House of Commons, Churchill proposed a humble address of condolence to the Queen, and the House then adjourned until the next day. The Royal Household observed a mourning period of one month until 25 April, and the official engagements of the royal family were cancelled. However the coronation of her granddaughter Elizabeth II was not postponed, according to Mary's wishes. Preparations for the coronation also meant that Westminster Abbey was ruled out as the venue for her funeral. On 25 March, the Queen's Own Rifles of Canada, of which Mary was colonel-in-chief, held a regimental parade dedicated to her memory.

== Lying in state ==
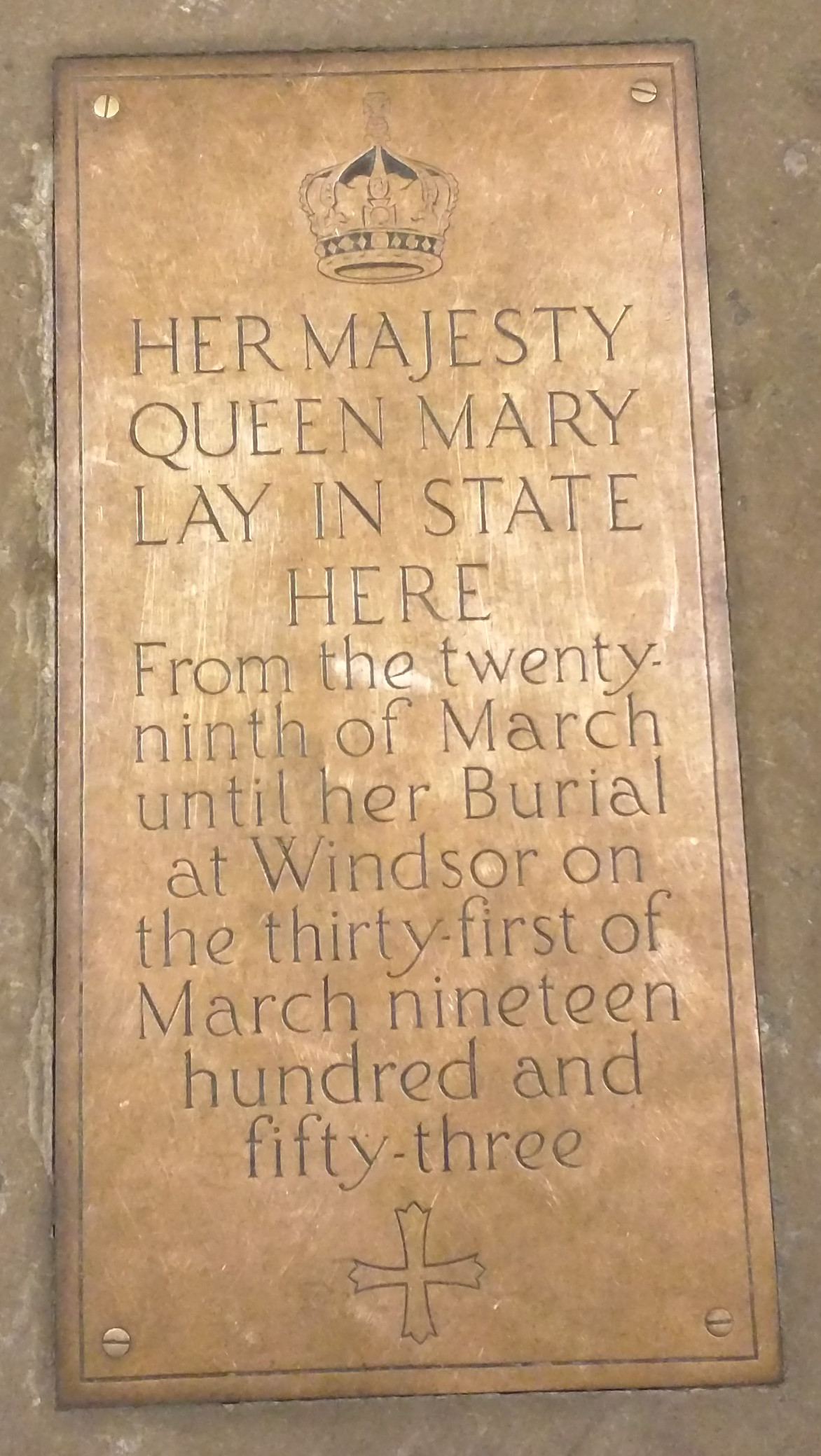
A plaque in Westminster Hall commemorating the lying in state

Mary's coffin was placed in the Queen's Chapel in the grounds of Marlborough House on 26 March, where it was guarded by members of her household.

On 29 March at noon, the Archbishop of Canterbury conducted a small service at the chapel attended by the Queen, the Duke of Edinburgh, the Queen Mother, and other members of the royal family. A wreath of lilies, roses and carnations from Queen Elizabeth II and Prince Philip, Duke of Edinburgh was on top of the coffin, with a wreath from the Queen Mother and Princess Margaret, and another from Mary's children and other daughters-in-law placed nearby. At 2:29 pm the coffin was taken from Marlborough House to Westminster Hall for her lying in state, on a route that was a mile and a half long. It was draped in her personal standard with the wreath from Queen Elizabeth II on top. The gun carriage of the King's Troop, Royal Horse Artillery, on which the coffin was placed, passed The Mall towards the Horse Guards Parade and into Whitehall in a procession through streets lined by half a million people. There were six pallbearers, including colonels from four regiments of which Mary had been colonel-in-chief such as the 13th/18th Royal Hussars.

Taking part in the procession were 210 all ranks from the Royal Air Force, followed by 210 all ranks from the Brigade of Gurkhas, 42 all ranks from the Household Cavalry, and 262 all ranks from the Royal Navy and the Royal Marines. Following them were the massed bands of the Brigade of Gurkhas, two of Queen Mary's footmen, two of her pages, and her steward. The gun carriage was escorted by three pallbearers on either side, flanked on the outside by the bearer party from the Queen's Company of the Grenadier Guards. The Duke of Edinburgh (in the uniform of an Admiral of the Fleet), the Duke of Windsor (also in the uniform of an Admiral of the Fleet), the Duke of Gloucester (in the uniform of the Colonel of the Scots Guards), the Duke of Kent (in top hat and morning dress), Prince Georg of Denmark, members of the British nobility, the First Sea Lord, the Adjutant-General to the Forces, Sir John Whitworth-Jones, and detachments from regiments associated with Mary followed the procession. The whole route was lined with military personnel, all at reverse arms. They only presented arms once the gun carriage was passing in front of them. The participants marched at a pace of 80 to the minute and gun salutes were fired every minute. The procession lasted twenty six minutes and the coffin arrived at Westminster Hall at 2:55 pm.

Once the coffin was placed at Westminster Hall at 3:00 pm, royal dukes, Mary's brother the Earl of Athlone, her grandsons the Earl of Harewood and the Hon. Gerald Lascelles, and the nobility stood on one side of the catafalque, while the Queen, the Queen Mother, Princess Margaret, the Princess Royal, the Duchess of Gloucester, the Duchess of Kent, Princess Alexandra, and Princess Alice, Countess of Athlone stood on the other side. The Grenadier Guards provided the guard of honour and regiments of the Royal Air Force were also present. A short service was conducted by the Archbishop of Canterbury in the presence of members of the royal family. Also in attendance were the Prime Minister, members of the Parliament and their spouses. Mary's remains lay in state between 29 and 31 March 1953, where heads of state as well as 119,959 mourners filed past her coffin watched by Honourable Corps of Gentlemen at Arms and Yeomen of the Guard. The Duke of Windsor and the Duke of Gloucester also took turn in standing vigil at their mother's coffin.

== Funeral and burial ==
On 31 March 1953, Mary's remains were taken by car from London to Windsor at 5:00 am, and were taken to the Albert Memorial Chapel in preparation for a procession within Windsor Castle grounds to St George's Chapel. Mourners travelled from London Paddington station to Windsor on a special train. The coffin was brought into St George's Chapel by six military pallbearers, all chosen from regiments with which she was associated. It was brought in through the great east door at 11:00 am. As the coffin was moved across the chapel it was preceded by Capt. Arthur Pageant, Lord Claud Hamilton, the Hon. John Coke, who bore Mary's insignia and orders of chivalry, and the Lord Chamberlain. Following it were the Duke of Edinburgh, the Duke of Windsor, the Duke of Gloucester, the Duke of Kent, the Earl of Athlone, the Crown Prince of Norway (Queen Mary's nephew), the King of the Belgians, the King of Jordan, Prince Axel of Denmark, Prince Chula of Thailand, Prince Bertil of Sweden, Prince Felix of Luxembourg, Prince Georg of Denmark, the Duke of Brunswick, Prince George William of Hanover, Prince Louis of Hesse and by Rhine, the Earl Mountbatten of Burma, the Earl of Harewood, the Hon. Gerald Lascelles, the Marquess of Carisbrooke, Admiral Sir Alexander Ramsay, the Marquess of Cambridge (Queen Mary's nephew), the Marquess of Milford Haven, the Duke of Beaufort, Richard Abel Smith (Queen Mary's grandnephew), Sir John Weir, Lord Webb-Johnson, and Sir Horace Evans. The Queen and other female members of the royal family did not follow the coffin on foot, but instead took their places within the chapel ahead of its arrival. Foreign female royals in attendance included Queen Juliana of the Netherlands, Queen Frederica of Greece and the Duchess of Brunswick.

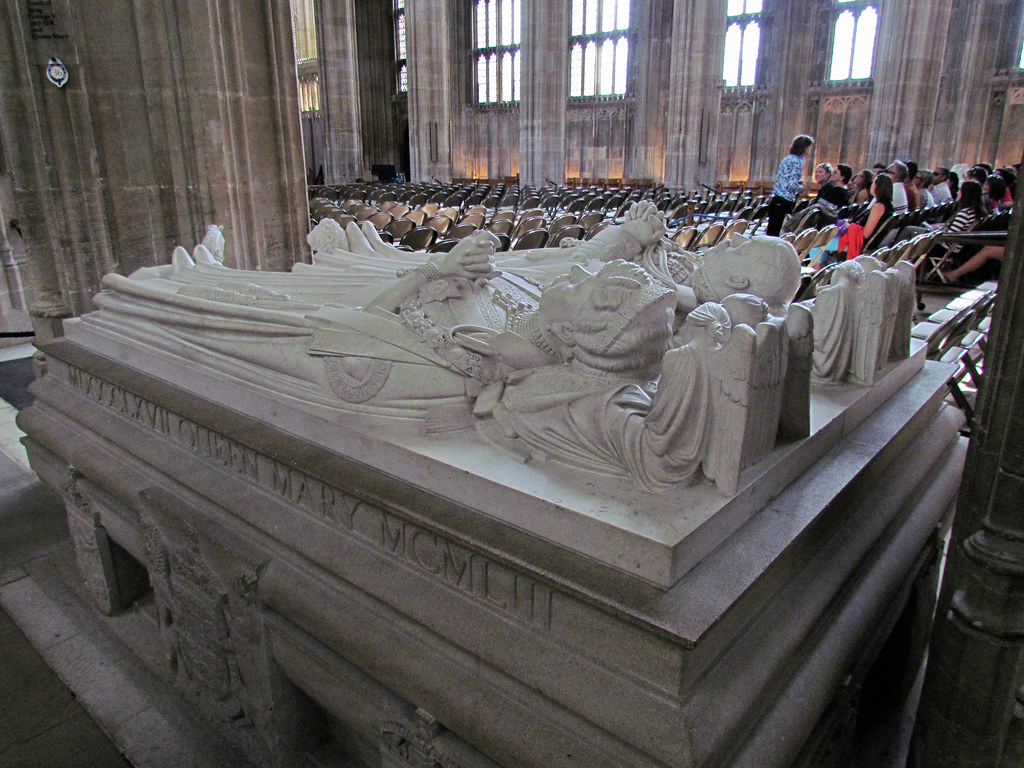
Monumental tomb of King George V and Queen Mary at St George's Chapel, Windsor

1,500 mourners, including foreign dignitaries, attended the funeral service, which was conducted by the Archbishop of Canterbury and the Dean of Windsor and broadcast by the BBC on radio. It lasted 40 minutes. Hymns included in the service were "Abide with Me" and "Glorious Things of Thee Are Spoken". Once the coffin was lowered to the Royal Vault through the floor of the choir, the Queen sprinkled earth from Frogmore three times from a silver bowl onto her grandmother's coffin as the Archbishop declared her resurrection to eternal life and pronounced the words "Earth to Earth, Ashes to Ashes, Dust to Dust". He then pronounced the benediction, which was followed by the "Dead March". The Garter Principal King of Arms read out the titles and styles of Queen Mary towards the end of the ceremony. At the conclusion of the service, the Queen, the Queen Mother, and other female members of the royal family curtsied before the coffin and the royal dukes bowed as they left. After the official ceremony, members of the public were permitted on castle grounds to view floral tributes. A memorial service was held at St Paul's Cathedral on the same day, which was attended by 4,000 members of the public. Mary's body was taken to the Royal Vault before being interred next to her husband's beneath a monumental sarcophagus in the North Nave Aisle of St George's Chapel. It is surmounted by tomb effigies of Mary and George, sculpted by Sir William Reid Dick.

In August 1953, the Principal Probate Registry records showed that Mary had left £379,864 in her will. Her will was sealed in London after her death. Her estate was valued at £406,407 (or £7.9 million in 2022 when adjusted for inflation).
