= William Callow =

English painter (1812–1908)

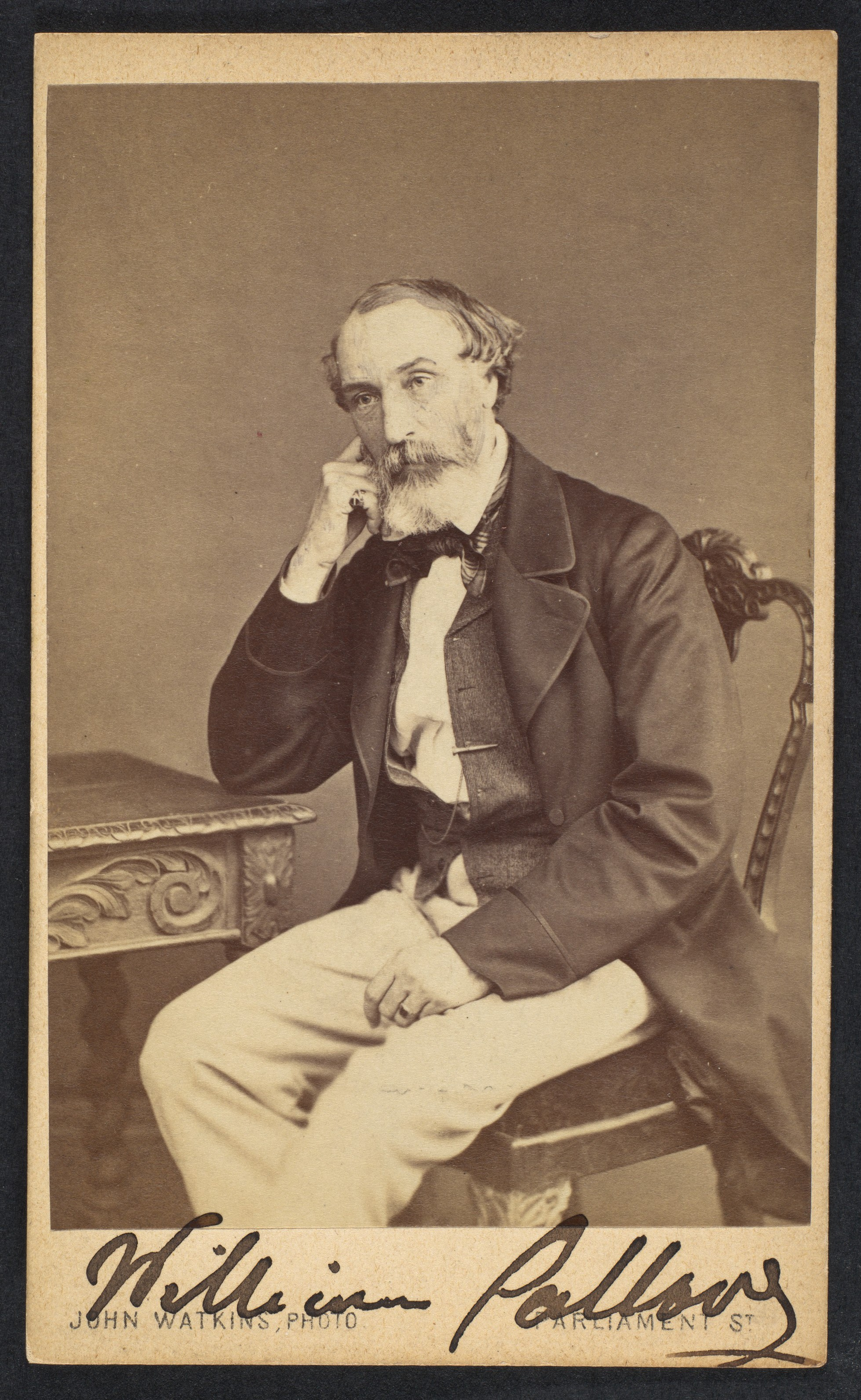
- William Callow, 1860s
- Born: 28 July 1812; Greenwich
- Died: 1908 (aged 95–96)
- Known for: landscape, watercolour, engraving

William Callow (1812–1908) was an English landscape painter, engraver and water colourist.

== Career ==
Callow was born in Greenwich on 28 July 1812. He was apprenticed to the artist Copley Fielding, where he learnt the technique of plein air sketching. He went on to study under Theodore and Thales Fielding, where he learnt to colour prints and make aquatints, and was taught water colour painting between 1825 and 1827.

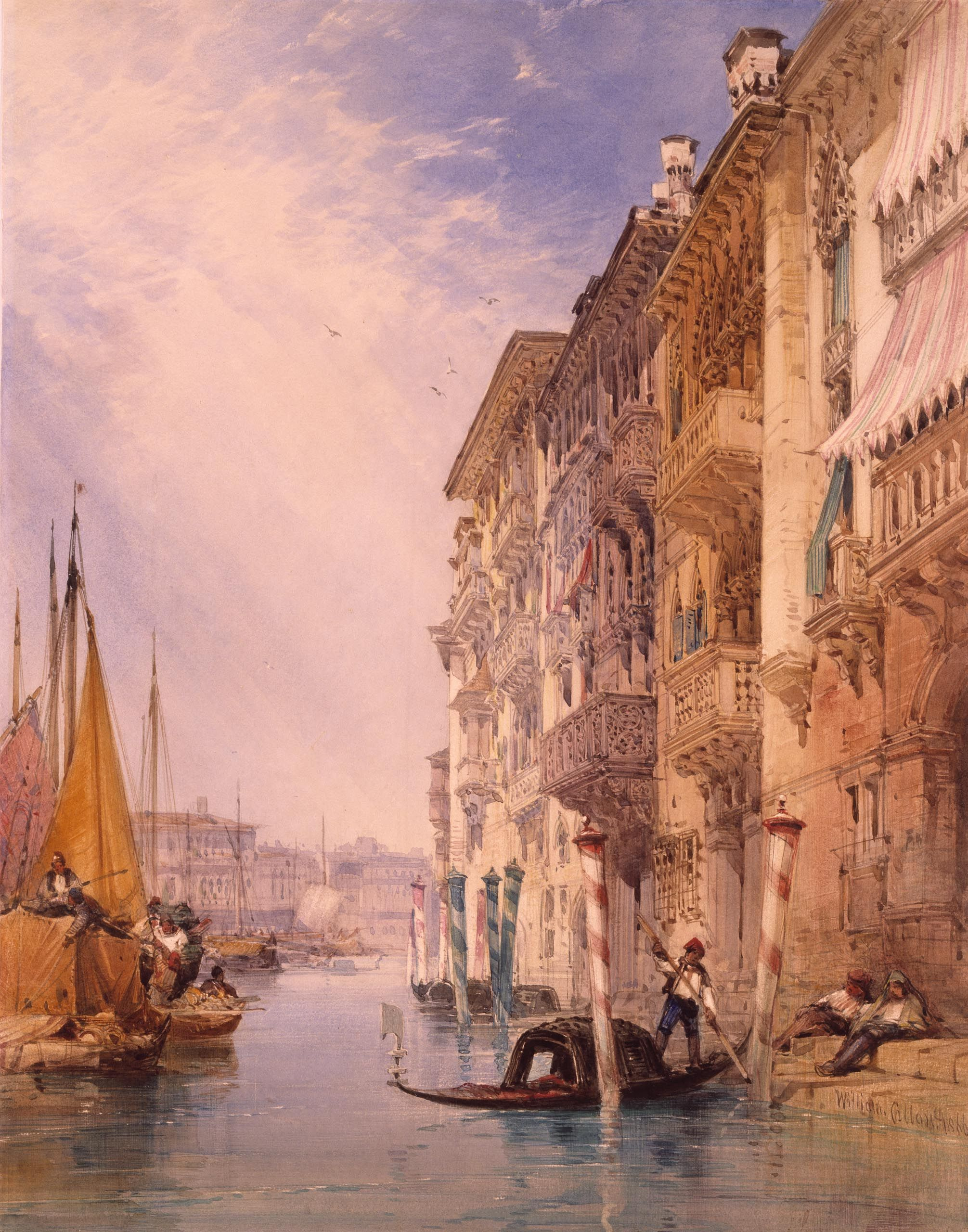
A Gondola on the Grand Canal, Venice, by William Callow.

In 1829 Thales Fielding found him work as an engraver in Paris, where he worked alongside his friend Charles Bentley. While in the French capital he was encouraged by Thomas Shotter Boys to take up watercolours again. After exhibiting a watercolour of Richmond Hill in the Paris Salon of 1831, he was offered a job teaching the family of King Louis Philippe I of France, and for several years gave lessons to the Duc de Nemours and Princess Clémentine, while his own works rapidly gained popularity in England. This was helped by his influence over Francois, prince de Joinville during the turbulence of the July Revolution. Briefly the 'Callow youth' was plunged into a platonic love affair that went unrequited with the darling Princess Clementine.

Elected a member of the Old Water-Colour Society, Callow returned to London in 1841 and began to paint larger pictures, moving away from the more "dashing" style of his earlier smaller works. He travelled extensively in France, the Netherlands, Belgium, Germany, Switzerland and Italy, had a large number of pupils, and enjoyed favour with the royal family. He married one of his students, the artist and composer Harriet Anne Smart, in 1846.

He kept detailed diaries of his early travels, and just before his death, his sight having failed, he dictated an autobiography. In 1855 he moved to Great Missenden, in Buckinghamshire, where he died in 1908.

== Bibliography ==
- Addison, Henry Robert; Oakes, Charles Henry; Lawson, William John; Sladen, Douglas; Wheelton, Brooker (1907). "William Callow". Who's Who. 59. London: Adam and Charles Black.
- Cundall, H. M.; Callow, William (1908). William Callow, RWS FRGS - An Autobiography. London: Adam and Charles Black.
- Hargreaves, Matthew (2007). Great British Watercolors: from the Paul Mellon collection. Yale: Yale University Press.
- Macfall, Haldane (2004). A History of Painting: The Modern Genius Part Eight. Kessinger Publishing.
- Mallalieu, Huon (9 December 2015). "Vive la Revolution!". Country Life.
