= The Six Wives of Henry VIII =

The Six Wives of Henry VIII were the wives of Henry VIII, i.e. the six queens consort wedded to Henry between 1509 and 1547.

The Six Wives of Henry VIII may also refer to:

- The Six Wives of Henry VIII (1970 TV series), a 1970 BBC TV miniseries
  - Henry VIII and His Six Wives, a 1972 film adaptation of the BBC TV miniseries
- The Six Wives of Henry VIII (album), a 1973 album by Rick Wakeman
  - The Six Wives of Henry VIII Live at Hampton Court Palace, a 2009 live album based on Wakeman's original release
- The Six Wives of Henry VIII (book), a 1991 book by Alison Weir
- The Six Wives of Henry VIII, a 1993 book by Antonia Fraser
- The Six Wives of Henry VIII (2001 TV series), a 2001 documentary series by David Starkey
- The Six Wives of Henry VIII, a 2016 miniseries presented and partially narrated by Dan Jones and Suzannah Lipscomb
- Six (musical), a 2017 musical comedy.

== See also ==
- Cultural depictions of Henry VIII
