= Charles Bentley (painter) =

English painter (1805/06–1854)

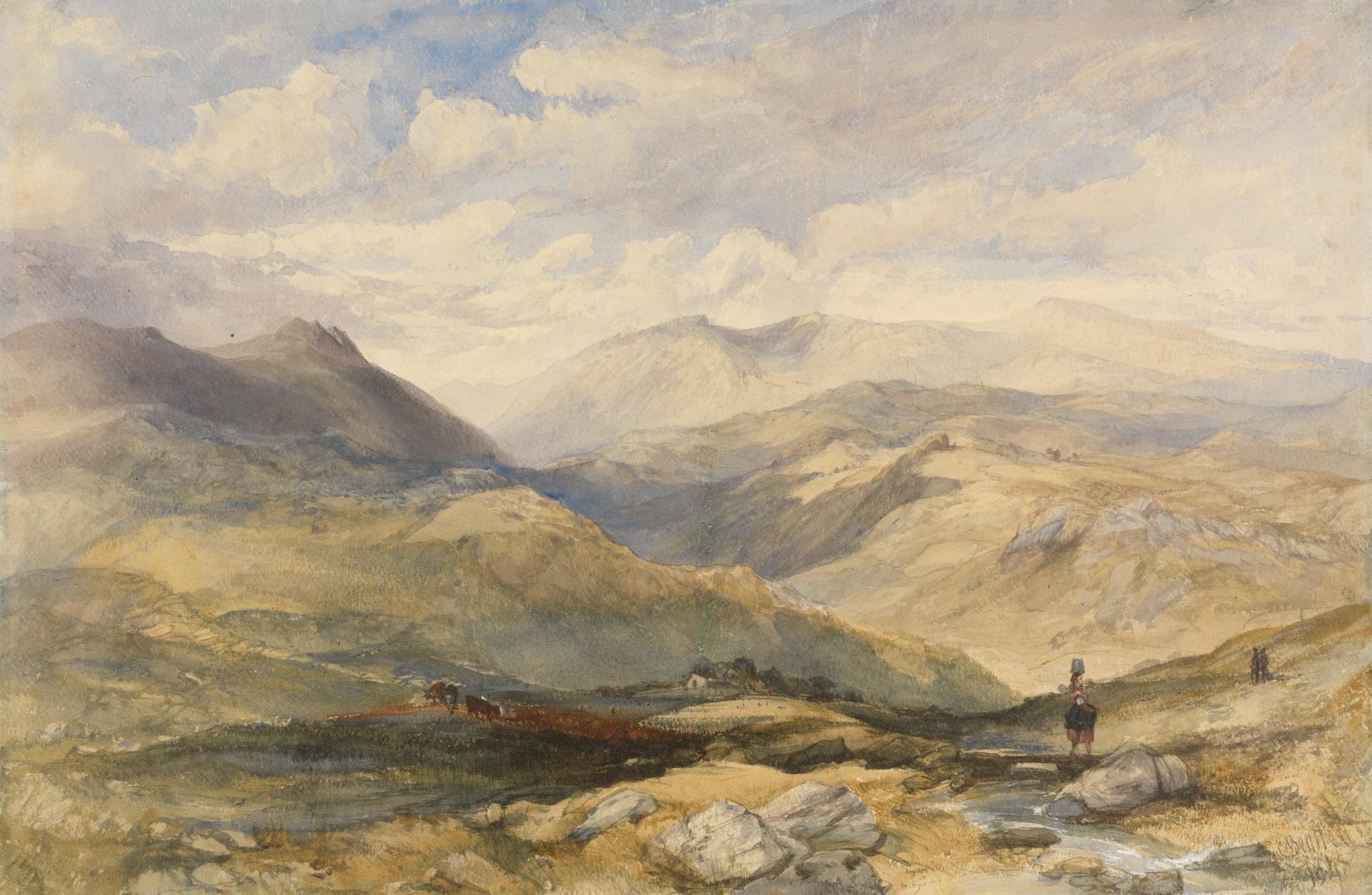
Highland Landscape with Figures, watercolour c. 1847, Yale Center for British Art

Charles Bentley (1805/6–4 September 1854), was an English watercolour painter of marine, coastal and river scenes.

== Life ==
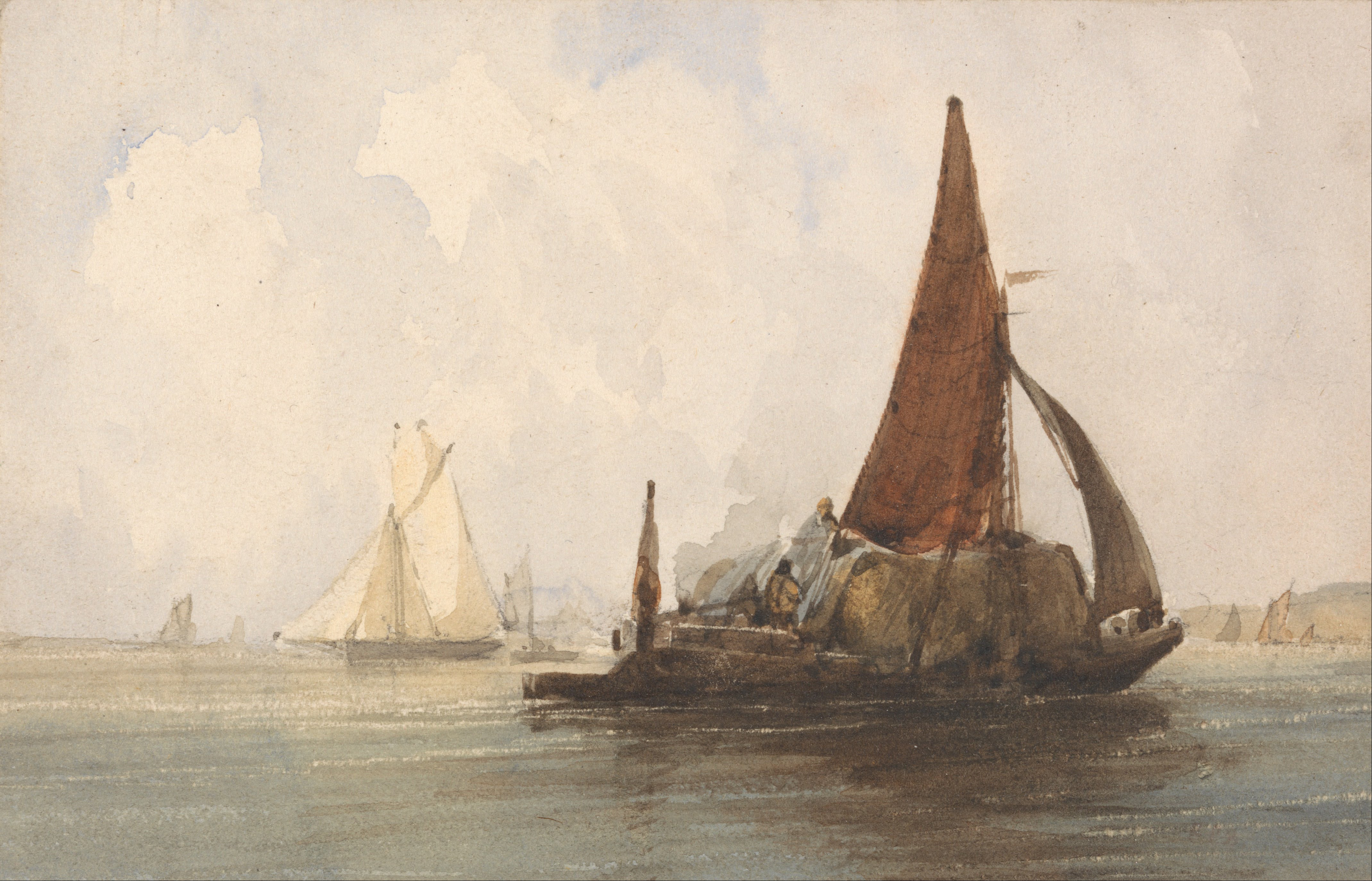
Hay Barge in a Calm Sea, watercolour, Yale

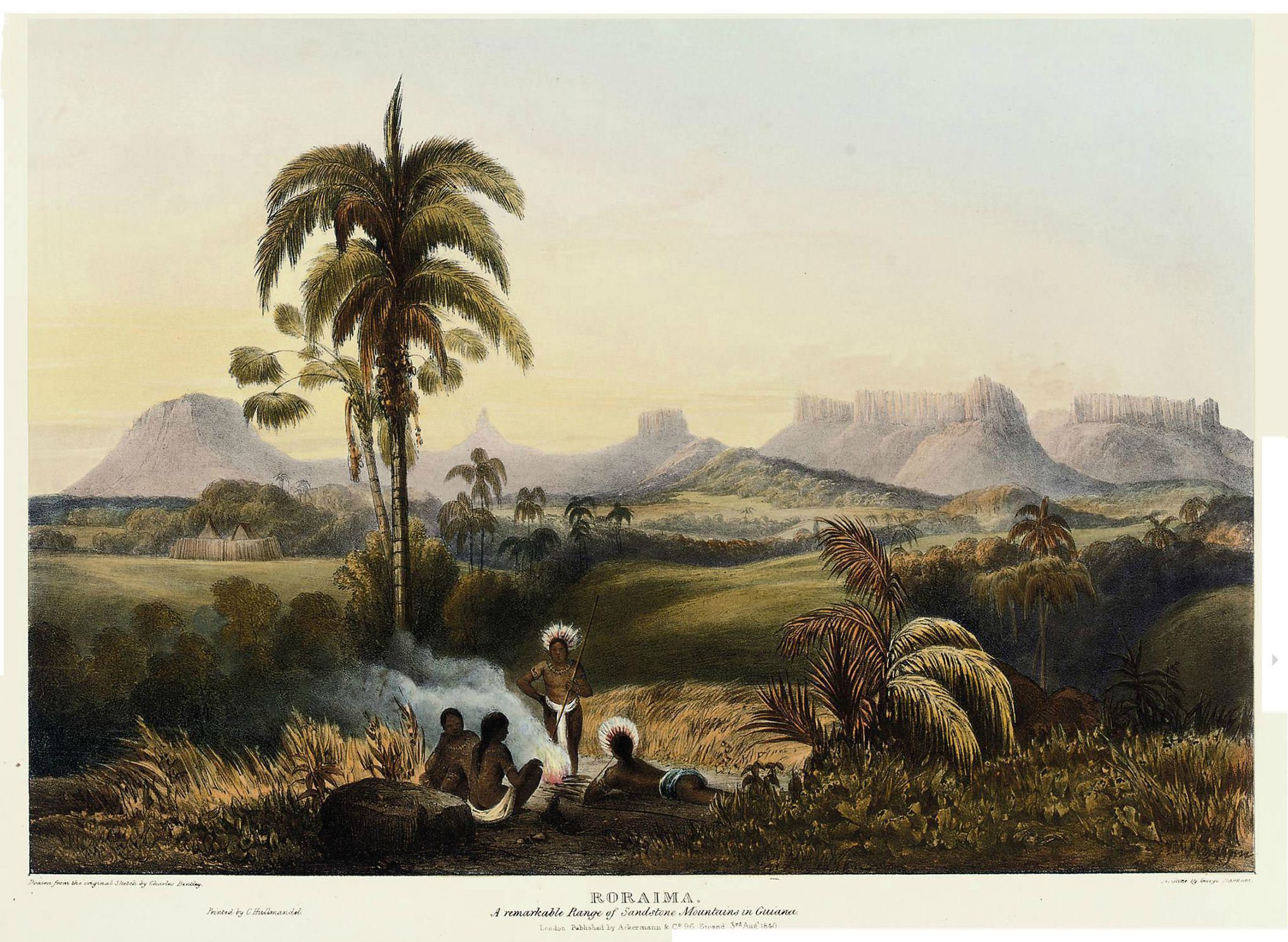
Print after Bentley of Roraima, a mountain range in Guiana

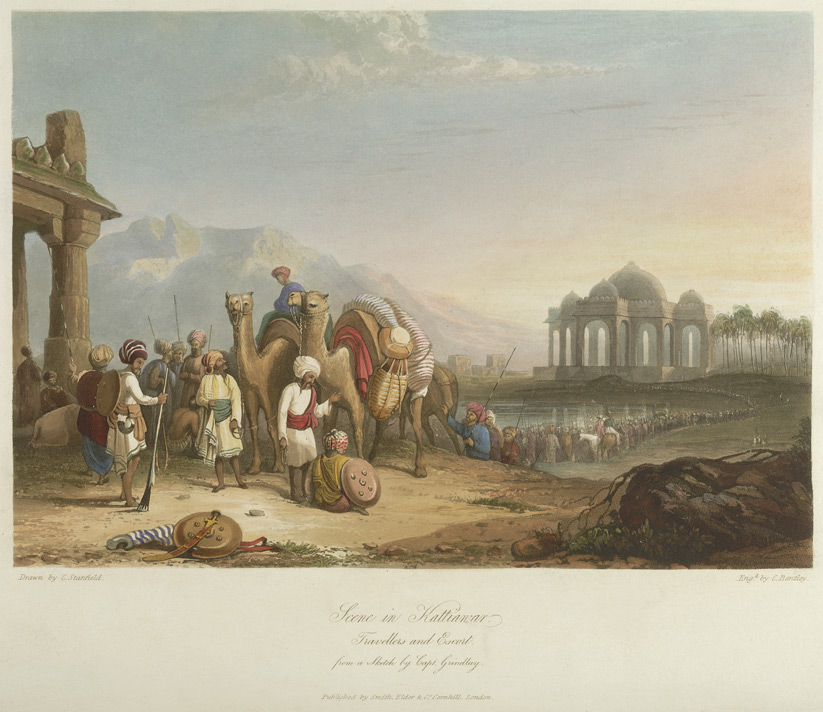
Engraving of "Scene in Kattiawar, Travellers and Escort", India.

Bentley was born in 1805 or 1806, the son of a master-carpenter and builder living in Tottenham Court Road, London. He was sent to work colouring prints for Theodore Fielding to whom he was eventually apprenticed in order to learn aquatinting. Bentley became a lifelong friend of another, rather younger, pupil of Fielding, William Callow. During his apprenticeship he was sent to Paris, probably to assist work on the plates for Excursion sur les Cotes et dans les Ports de Normandie' (Paris, 1823-5), most of which were after watercolours by Richard Bonington.

After the end of his apprenticeship, though earning some money from engraving or designing plates for periodicals, Bentley turned increasingly to painting watercolours. He exhibited four works at the first Exhibition of the New Society of Painters in Water-Colours, (later the Royal Institute of Painters in Water-Colours) in 1832, and six the next year. He was then living at 15, Bateman's Buildings, a narrow turning on the south side of Soho Square, where he remained for another six years. In February 1834, Bentley was elected an Associate-Exhibitor of the Old Water-Colour Society (later the Royal Society of Painters in Water-Colours). By 1838 he had moved to 11, Mornington Place, Hampstead Road, where, except for a three-year break (when he lived with William Callow in Charlotte Street) he spent the rest of his life. His exhibits at the Old Water-Colour Society in 1838 included two imaginative compositions :From the Red Rover, depicting a naval battle, and From Tom Cringle's Log, which represented a sinking slave-ship. He showed at the British Institution for the first time in 1843, and the next year became a full member of the "Old Society" . In 1851 he showed at the Society of British Artists.

Bentley painted scenes all over Britain, in Jersey, the north of Ireland, and in Normandy, which he visited several times with Callow between 1836 and 1841. He also exhibited views of Venice, Holland and Düsseldorf, but it is not certain that he actually went to these places, as he is known to have painted works after sketches by other people, such as his paintings of Trebizond and Abydos, shown in 1841 and 1849, based on drawings by Coke Smyth. He also worked up the illustrations for 12 Views in the Interior of Guiana, published by Rudolf Ackermann in 1841, from studies done on an expedition to South America by John Morison.

Bentley was not financially successful: Samuel Redgrave described him as "uncertain in his transactions, and always poor". He died of cholera on 4 September 1854, leaving a widow, and was buried in the western side of Highgate Cemetery. The grave (no.6056) no longer has a headstone or marker.

His works are in a good number of British museums, and some American ones (though they will usually not be on display), as well as appearing on the art market fairly frequently.
