= Nathan Theodore Fielding =

English painter

Nathan Theodore Fielding (fl. 1775–1814) was an English painter.

== Life ==
Fielding was a native of Yorkshire, and lived near Halifax. He had a considerable local reputation, and was especially noted for his portraits of aged people in the style of Balthasar Denner, with attention to the wrinkles of the skin and expression of the eyes. He later went to London, and occasionally exhibited at the exhibitions of the Society of Artists and the British Institution. To the latter, he sent in 1812 The Botanist, with a Nondescript Fern, and A Moonlight Seacoast. In 1814, he exhibited for the last time, sending A Landscape – Morning.

In 1801, he published a print of St. George's Church, Doncaster, which was aquatinted by his son Theodore. He occasionally etched, notably a portrait of Elias Hoyle of Sowerby in Yorkshire, aged 113, in 1793. There are several oil paintings by Fielding in the Peterborough Museum and Art Gallery, including a panoramic view of Stamford, Lincolnshire, entitled Hay Harvest at Stamford painted in about 1780 and a view of the Market Square in Peterborough.

Fielding had five sons, all artists, including Theodore Henry Adolphus, Antony Vandyke Copley, Thales, and Newton Smith Fielding.
