= Hymnsongs =

Studio album by Phil Keaggy
- Released: October 29, 2002
- Studios: Jersey Beat Studios (Cincinnati, Ohio); Kegworth Studio (Nashville, Tennessee)
- Genres: Folk; Country; World music
- Length: 47:27
- Labels: Word Entertainment; Curb Records
- Producers: Ric Hordinski; Phil Keaggy

Phil Keaggy chronology
Cinemascapes (2001)	Hymnsongs (2002)	Special Occasions (2003)

Professional ratings
Review scores
Source	Rating
AllMusic	3/5 stars
Cross Rhythms	6/10 squares

Hymnsongs is the title of a 2003 instrumental album by guitarist Phil Keaggy.

== Track listing ==
1. "Prelude" (Phil Keaggy) - 0:47
2. "In the Bleak Midwinter" - 5:32
3. "O Sacred Head, Now Wounded" - 2:13
4. "Abide with Me" - 5:10
5. "This Fragile Vessel" (Márie Brennan, Keith Getty) - 2:23
6. "Jerusalem" - 5:12
7. "Simple Gifts" - 5:32
8. "Chorale #198" - 0:53
9. "Fairest Lord Jesus" - 4:10
10. "Nothing But the Blood" - 2:53
11. "Be Still My Soul" - 4:33
12. "O for a Closer Walk With Thee" (Lyric adaptation: William Cowper; Music adaptation: Keith Getty) - 2:42
13. "Our Daily Bread" (Keaggy) - 1:19
14. "The Day Thou Gavest, Lord, Has Ended" - 4:10

== Personnel ==
- Phil Keaggy – guitars, performer (5, 12), bass (6, 7, 9), mandolin (9), loops (11)
- Ric Hordinski – guitars (2-4, 7, 8, 14), effects and treatments (2, 4, 7, 14), samples (14)
- Emmit Jones – sequencing (4)
- Amos Heller – bass (2, 4)
- Josh Seurkamp – drums (2, 4, 6, 7, 14), percussion (4)

=== Production ===
- Barry Landis – executive producer
- Ric Hordinski – producer, recording, mixing, arrangements (2-4, 7, 8, 14)
- Phil Keaggy – producer, recording, mixing, arrangements (5, 9-11, 13)
- Richard Dodd – mastering at Vital Recordings (Nashville, Tennessee)
- Katherine Petillo – creative director
- Anderson Thomas Design – art direction, design, illustrations
- Jay Smith – art direction, design, illustrations
- Jim "Señor" McGuire – photography
- Mark Bacus – liner notes
- Norman Miller for Proper Management – management
