= The Six Wives of Henry VIII (album) =

Studio album by Rick Wakeman
- Released: 23 January 1973
- Recorded: February–October 1972
- Studios: Morgan and Trident, London
- Genres: Progressive rock; instrumental rock
- Length: 36:36
- Label: A&M
- Producer: Rick Wakeman

Rick Wakeman chronology
Piano Vibrations (1971)	The Six Wives of Henry VIII (1973)	Journey to the Centre of the Earth (1974)

Singles from The Six Wives of Henry VIII
- 1. "Catherine Parr"/"Anne Boleyn" Released: 23 March 1973

Official audio
- "Catherine Parr" on YouTube

The Six Wives of Henry VIII is the second studio album by English keyboardist Rick Wakeman, released in January 1973 on A&M Records. It is an instrumental progressive rock album with a unifying thematic concept; the six tracks are musical descriptions of the characters of each of the wives of Henry VIII. After signing with A&M as a solo artist, Wakeman decided on the album's unifying idea during a tour of the United States with the progressive rock band Yes. As he read a book about Henry VIII while travelling, he began to write ideas for the record incorporating melodies he had composed the previous year. The album was recorded throughout 1972 with musicians from Yes and the Strawbs, the group Wakeman was in prior to his work in Yes.

The Six Wives of Henry VIII reached number seven on the UK Albums Chart and number 30 on the Billboard 200 in the United States. It was certified gold by the Recording Industry Association of America in 1975 for over 500,000 copies sold in the United States, and it has been estimated to have sold 15 million copies worldwide. In 2009, Wakeman performed the album in its entirety for the first time at Hampton Court Palace as part of the 500th anniversary celebration of Henry's accession to the throne, released as The Six Wives of Henry VIII Live at Hampton Court Palace. The tracks were rearranged with sections, including a track dedicated to Henry himself, that were left off the original album due to the limited time available on a single record. The Six Wives of Henry VIII was reissued in 2015 with a quadrophonic sound mix and bonus tracks.

== Background and writing ==
In August 1971, Rick Wakeman joined the progressive rock band Yes as a replacement for their original keyboardist Tony Kaye. His previous group, the Strawbs, were signed to A&M Records and their deal granted each member the option to release an album as a solo artist. While touring the US with Yes to promote Fragile (1971), manager Brian Lane informed Wakeman that A&M co-founder and executive Jerry Moss wished to meet him. During their meeting at A&M Studios in Los Angeles, Wakeman accepted Moss's offer to make a solo album and received an advance of $12,500 (around £4,000) to make it. A&M offered Wakeman a present for signing on with them; he remembered a 1957 Cadillac limousine in the parking lot and had A&M ship one that was previously owned by actor Clark Gable to England. Wakeman lost the car in the late 1970s as part of his divorce settlement with his first wife.

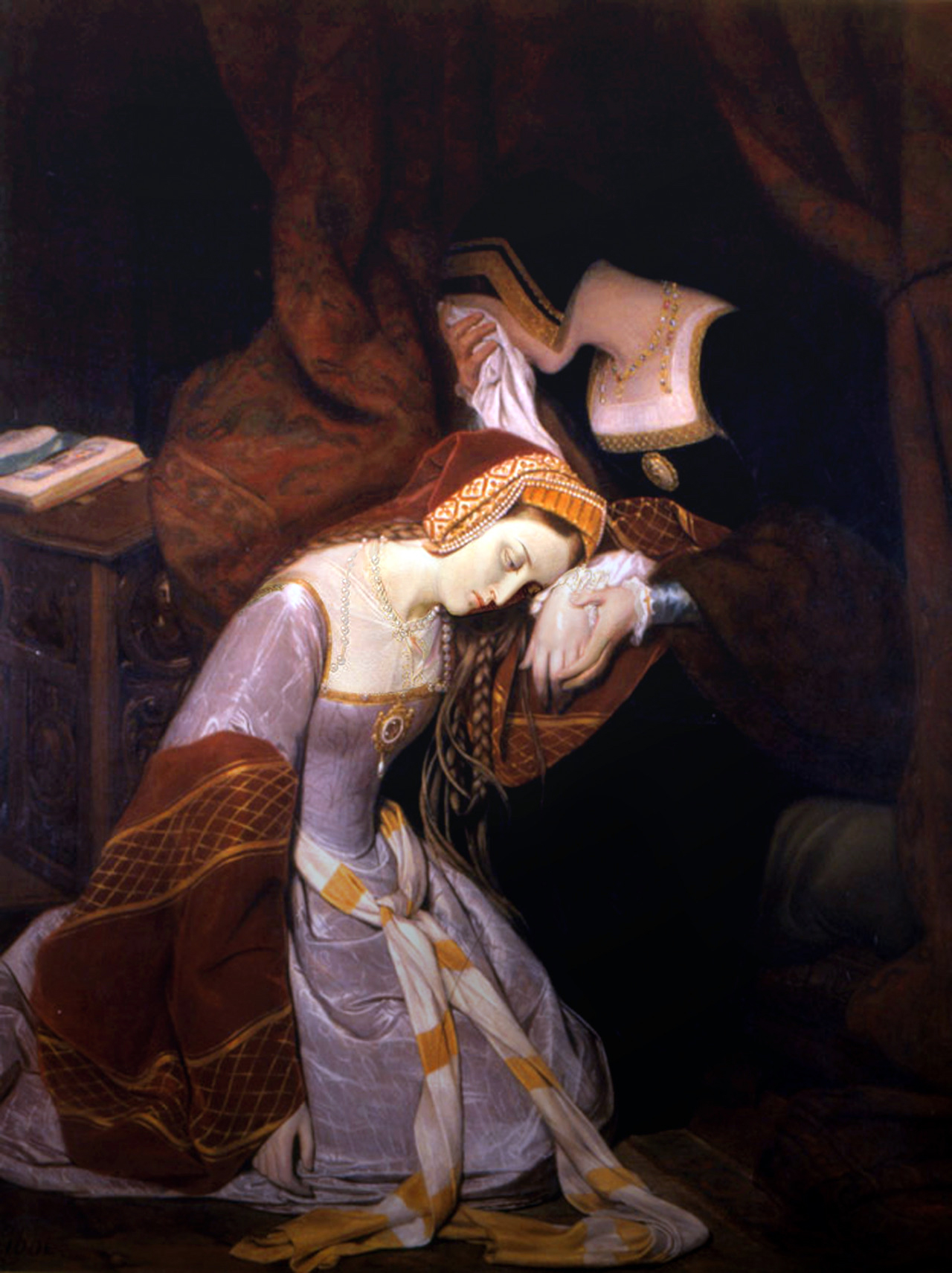
The album's concept was decided upon as Wakeman read about Anne Boleyn being imprisoned at the Tower of London, depicted here by Édouard Cibot.

Wakeman had difficulties from the start as he was not a competent singer or lyricist, had no band of his own, or any musical ideas. He was disappointed with his playing early into the Fragile Tour, so he used the opportunity as a way of cheering himself up musically. He saw little point in writing songs that had meaningless words, but was interested to explore musical experimentation and strong melody. Starting in November 1971, he assembled some rough ideas onto tape, forming several tracks of 2 to 4 minutes in length, but he recalled that upon playback, "there was really nothing there." When the Yes tour resumed, Wakeman bought four books at an airport bookstall in Richmond, Virginia, including one about Henry VIII and his six wives titled The Private Life of Henry VIII (1964) by Nancy Brysson Morrison. As he read about Anne Boleyn being imprisoned at the Tower of London on the subsequent flight to Chicago, a theme he had put down ran through his mind, which he wrote down on some hand drawn ledger lines and played at a following soundcheck. Said Wakeman: "Suddenly I found it in writing music about these six ladies ... I would concentrate on one of the wives and then music just came into my head and I would write it down. Sometimes I was flying, other times I was on stage, or just in front of the piano at home ... The six wives theme gave me the thread, the link, I needed to give me a reason for putting these pieces of music together."

Wakeman went on to purchase more books on the subject. He did not want to merely depict the historical events, and wrote the music as if he was producing a surrealist painting, "sketches of how I felt about them at the time". He also did not want the album to be purely orchestral but have an orchestral "flavour", and wanted to play contemporary electronic keyboards to demonstrate how much they had improved since they had been introduced. He explained the album's concept further in the liner notes: "The album is based around my interpretations of the musical characteristics of the wives of Henry VIII. Although the style may not always be in keeping with their individual history, it is my personal conception of their characters in relation to keyboard instruments."

== Recording and production ==
Recording took place between February and October 1972 at Morgan and Trident Studios in London during gaps in recording and touring with Yes. Wakeman found himself becoming unsatisfied in what he had put down at previous sessions and re-recorded sections often, an approach which he later said helped keep the material fresh. The album was recorded onto 16-track, and features Ken Scott as recording engineer on "Catherine of Aragon" and "Catherine Parr" and Paul Tregurtha for the other tracks. Wakeman was partially influenced musically by Paintings (1972), the first studio album by American keyboardist Michael Quatro. Wakeman informed Quatro that he was his favorite keyboardist during this time, and used some of his Moog synthesiser lines on the album. The album features several guest musicians on drums, percussion, guitar, and bass, including members of Strawbs and Yes and people Wakeman knew during his time as a session musician. Wakeman wanted to avoid using the same musicians for the whole album, and used his demos and a guide in selecting which musician he thought would best suit each track to vary the sound. Although Wakeman had some precise arrangements for the musicians to play, he left some sections free for the players to devise their own parts. The tracks were not arranged according to historical chronology, but so as to make the album sound "musically interesting" and to have the personalities of the wives in "some kind of meaningful order."

When the album was finished, its production costs had increased to around £25,000. Wakeman described working on it as "difficult and cumbersome", but felt the project became a rewarding one. He was excited to present the album to A&M management at their London office, and played it to the head of the UK division, Tony Burdfield and Terry O'Neill of the promotions department, and an American lawyer who represented the US division. Wakeman "sensed that something was not right in the room. There was pretty much silence as it finished", and recalled the lawyer saying that it was a good work-in-progress and was looking forward to hearing vocals on it. After Wakeman explained that it was an instrumental album, the lawyer left the room. The head of A&M felt the album would be too difficult to sell, and another member of staff estimated that 50,000 copies had to be sold in order to make a profit. After a subsequent meeting with two A&R men, who expressed their fondness for its "off the wall" quality, the label gave the green-light and agreed to an initial pressing of 12,500 copies. Wakeman looked back at this moment and "was absolutely deflated", and has said that no one from A&M apologised for their incorrect assumptions.

After presenting the album to A&M, management cut back the budget for the production of its cover. Wakeman had difficulty in obtaining portraits of the wives but managed to find some for the sleeve. The front photograph was taken at the Madame Tussauds wax museum, where a wax figure of Richard Nixon can be seen in the background as the curtain was not fully closed. Wakeman is shown wearing a t-shirt, jeans, and trainers. The cover was to be produced in black and white as A&M had refused to pay for a version in full colour, but Michael Doud managed to get the final design printed in a sepia tone, which Wakeman said was a vast improvement.

== Music ==
=== Side one ===
"Catherine of Aragon" is a track that Wakeman had wanted to put on Fragile, but contractual issues at the time prevented him from recording one of his own compositions. Its working title was "Handle With Care", which came about as staff at Trident recommended the tape's storage box be labelled something misleading to lower the risk of theft and the tapes being sold as bootlegs. The box was labelled "Handle with care for the Joe Loss Orchestra", which Wakeman used for the title. Wakeman has since clarified that the track was always intended to be on the album, and not Fragile. The track features Yes guitarist Steve Howe and bassist Chris Squire with percussionist Ray Cooper. Wakeman contacted Vicki Brown, who organised and brought in the female backing vocalists that are featured on it and "Anne Boleyn".

Wakeman described "Anne of Cleves" as a free-form track, "almost having no form at all, there was a contradiction in what everyone was playing. The guys in the band thought I was completely barking, but it had to be like that." On the morning of recording it Wakeman realised that the middle keyboard solo would only work as an improvisation, and told the musicians to play as if they were on stage. The section was put down in one take.

"Catherine Howard" features Strawbs bassist Chas Cronk, who recalled the "total confusion" when he recorded his parts as he "couldn't make head or tail of what [we] were doing. We were going through it part by part and I couldn't see how all the parts were going to match up." He later saw that Wakeman "knew exactly what he was going to do although he had nothing written down. It was all stored in his head." Wakeman wanted the drums on the piece to be "subtle and delicate", and chose Barry de Souza who had previously played with Wakeman in a pub band, the Spinning Wheel.

=== Side two ===
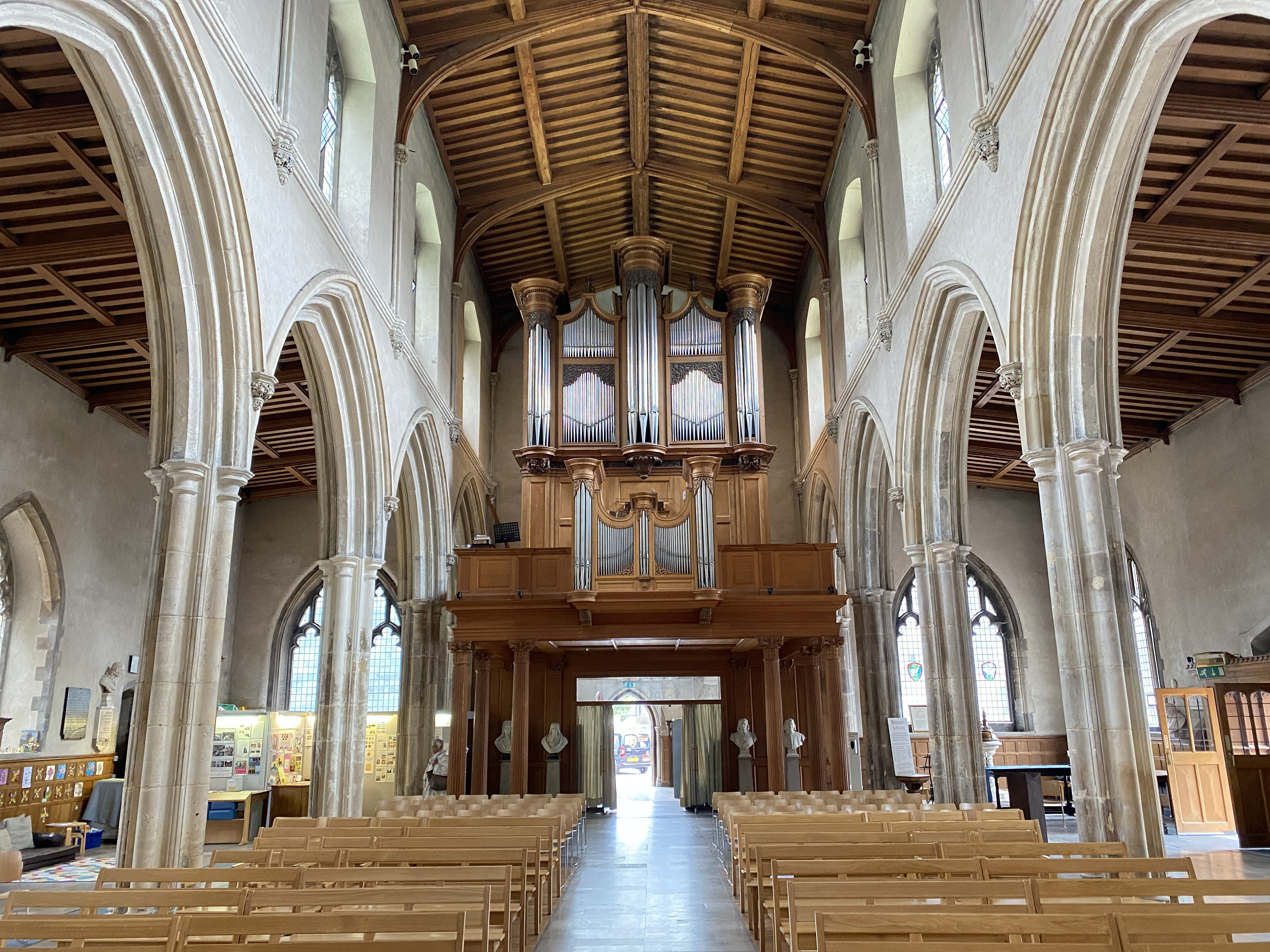
The organ of St Giles-without-Cripplegate, played on "Jane Seymour".

On "Jane Seymour", Wakeman had difficulty in achieving a satisfactory organ sound with his electronic instruments, so he sought permission to play a pipe organ at a church. He approached conductor Guy Protheroe, who suggested for him to enquire at St Giles-without-Cripplegate in Barbican. Wakeman later considered the church organ was the wrong instrument to portray Seymour's feeling towards Henry, and said it changed the overall mood of the track to what he originally intended. He wanted to avoid portraying strong religious connotations with the organ alone, so he added drums, a Thomas Goff model harpsichord, and Moog synthesizer. The original organ recording without the additional instruments was released on Wakeman's compilation release Medium Rare, in 2002.

At one point during the recording of "Anne Boleyn", Tregurtha produced a tape with a rough mix to which Wakeman listened on his drive home and felt the ending needed further work. That night he had a vivid dream where he was in attendance at her execution, when the crowd started to sing the hymn "St. Clement", the tune to the hymn "The Day Thou Gavest, Lord, is Ended". Upon waking he realised it was the right ending for the track, despite being written some years later, and recorded a wordless version with piano and female vocals. Though E. J. Hopkins is credited on the album, the piece is generally attributed to Reverend Clement Scholefield. Wakeman plays a portative organ made in the 1700s with reeds and wooden pipes, giving it a sound that he compared to someone's breath.

Wakeman wanted "Catherine Parr" to have "a really strong feel on drums, nothing subtle at all", and thought Yes drummer Alan White was best for the track.

=== Additional material ===
The album was to be named Henry VIII and His Six Wives and feature a track dedicated for Henry himself, but Wakeman recorded the tracks on the wives first and there was no space left on the LP. He scrapped the track, and renamed the album accordingly. A short passage that Wakeman wrote for Henry was put in "Catherine of Aragon", "Catherine Howard", and the beginning of "Anne Boleyn", as an attempt to "inject the feeling that the wives had for him" in the way that he played the theme.

== Release and commercial performance ==
To promote the album, Wakeman played excerpts from it on the BBC 2 television music show The Old Grey Whistle Test on 16 January 1973. Show producer Colin Strong and director Mike Appleton contacted A&M who got staffer Tony Burdfield to send them a copy, and liked the album which led to Wakeman being invited on the show. Wakeman brought along Cronk and Cousins to play the additional parts. Prior to recording they got drunk in the studio bar. An audience of around 10 million planned to watch David Bailey's controversial documentary about American pop figure Andy Warhol on ITV, but critics Mary Whitehouse and Ross McWhirter condemned it for its pornographic imagery and bad language, causing the government to ban it at short notice. Wakeman recalled: "It seems most of them, rather than watch repeats, switched over to Whistle Test and saw my preview of 'Henry'...and suddenly it seemed as if the whole country had discovered my music...it was a tremendous break". Burdfield also produced advertorials in several music magazines, featuring excerpts from an interview about the album that Wakeman had with radio DJ Johnnie Walker.

Following the album's release on 23 January 1973, it topped the album charts in four countries. It entered the UK Albums Chart at number 12 before it climbed to its peak position of number 7 the following week on 3 March 1973, and stayed on the chart for 13 weeks during its initial run. The album reappeared on the chart for seven non-consecutive weeks in 1973 alone, and twice more in 1975. In February 2015, the album re-entered the UK chart for one week at number 86. In the United States, the album reached a peak of number 30 on the Billboard 200 chart for the week of 30 March 1973, during a 45-week stay on the chart.

By July 1973, the album had sold 300,000 copies. In the following year, Wakeman was presented a platinum disc at the annual Midem Festival in Cannes for sales exceeding two million. On 20 October 1975, the album was certified gold by the Recording Industry Association of America for 500,000 copies sold in the United States. Wakeman said the sales figure grew to six million five years after its release. Modern reports indicate the album has sold an estimated 15 million copies worldwide.

== Reception ==
Professional ratings
Review scores
Source	Rating
AllMusic	4.5/5 stars

According to Wakeman, the album initially received a negative reaction. He recalled: "We had just one decent review, and that was from an angling magazine up in Grimsby. Even Melody Maker said that the album wasn't fit to be played in a lift [...] The best reviews that it got said simply, 'This is an interesting album,' but nobody really got it. And the press absolutely hated it." The album was seen by some as one of the worst examples of progressive rock excess.

Penny Valentine wrote a positive review in Sounds, saying it was "a very attractive album" with "a mix of the emotional flash, the calm and gentle, the grand and the simple. A good mixture." She praised the overall presentation of the sleeve and thought the record was an "excellent showcase" for Wakeman's skills. Rolling Stone reviewer Steve Apple noted Wakeman had "made his bid for Keith Emerson's place as the master of keyboard electronics" but thought his playing suffered a little in technique. Apple noticed "a brilliant feel for tasteful impressionistic composition", having made "an exceptionally interesting instrumental album with superb production". He also praised the mixing. Time named it one of the best pop albums of the year, describing it as "an astonishing classic-rock hybrid". Henry Mendoza reviewed the album for The San Bernardino County Sun and noted that despite the album's "interesting format" and its "excellent showcase" for Wakeman's keyboard skills, Mendoza thought the music sounded too much the same and was "monotonous and boring". San Mateo County Times printed a very positive review from Peter J. Barsocchini, who thought the album is "something just short of amazing" and "a supremely textured work which transcends most of the finest keyboard work being done in pop music today". He loosely compared the music to that of progressive rock band Emerson, Lake & Palmer, and mentioned Wakeman's "lyrical" and "deep, vast sound".

In a retrospective review, Mike DeGagne of AllMusic described Wakeman's use of his synthesizers as "masterful" and "instrumentally stunning".

== Live performance ==
Excerpts from the album were performed during Wakeman's solo spots on Yes's Fragile Tour and subsequent Close to the Edge Tour, from 1971 to 1973. A recording of his solo was included on the band's first live album Yessongs (1973), titled "Excerpts from 'The Six Wives of Henry VIII'", as well as their same-titled concert film (1975). The box set Progeny: Seven Shows from Seventy-Two (2015) features additional recordings of Wakeman's solos from 1972.

"When the opportunity came to re-score all these pieces for Hampton Court suddenly, there was no time limit. There were no rules and regulations about how the music had to be. And I could go back, revisit them, keep all of the elements that there were originally, and add the other little elements that could never be there."

— Rick Wakeman

In 1973 Wakeman sought permission to perform the album live at Hampton Court Palace. His request was denied, and "got the impression that what [he] had asked was tantamount to treason". A full performance of the album was never held until 36 years later, when he was asked to perform it as part of the celebrations to commemorate the 500th anniversary of Henry's accession to the throne. A stage was constructed outside the main palace entrance to seat 5,000 people. Wakeman performed with a six-piece arrangement of his band The English Rock Ensemble, the English Chamber Choir, and the Orchestra Europa, on 1 and 2 May 2009. The setlist included "Defender of the Faith", the track Wakeman wrote about Henry that was omitted from the album due to unavailable space on the vinyl, plus additional material written specifically for the concerts. The arrangement of the former was not exactly what Wakeman originally wrote, but its two main themes are the same. A live album, DVD, and Blu-ray titled The Six Wives of Henry VIII Live at Hampton Court Palace was released in 2009.

In February 2023 Wakeman performed two shows at the London Palladium which included in the first show a performance of The Six Wives of Henry VIII. The album will be performed once more in a forthcoming UK tour in October 2025.

== Track listing ==
All tracks written by Rick Wakeman. "Anne Boleyn" incorporates "The Day Thou Gavest Lord Hath Ended" written by Rev. Clement Cotteril Scholefield and arranged by Wakeman.

Side one
No.	Title	Length
1.	"Catherine of Aragon"	3:44
2.	"Anne of Cleves"	7:53
3.	"Catherine Howard"	6:35

Side two
No.	Title	Length
1.	"Jane Seymour"	4:46
2.	"Anne Boleyn 'The Day Thou Gavest Lord Hath Ended'"	6:32
3.	"Catherine Parr"	7:06

== Personnel ==
Credits are adapted from the album's sleeve notes.

=== Lead musician ===
- Rick Wakeman – 2 Minimoog synthesisers, 2 400-D Mellotrons (one for vocals, sound effects and vibraphone; the other for brass, strings and flutes), frequency counter, custom mixer, Steinway 9' grand piano, custom-built Hammond C-3 organ, RMI electric piano and harpsichord, ARP synthesiser, Thomas Goff harpsichord, church organ at St Giles-without-Cripplegate, portative organ

=== Additional musicians ===
- Bill Bruford – drums on "Catherine of Aragon" and "Anne Boleyn"
- Ray Cooper – percussion on "Catherine of Aragon" and "Anne Boleyn"
- Dave Cousins – electric banjo on "Catherine Howard"
- Chas Cronk – bass guitar on "Catherine Howard"
- Barry de Souza – drums on "Catherine Howard"
- Mike Egan – guitar on "Catherine of Aragon", "Anne of Cleves", "Anne Boleyn", and "Catherine Parr"
- Steve Howe – guitar on "Catherine of Aragon"
- Les Hurdle – bass guitar on "Catherine of Aragon" and "Anne Boleyn"
- Dave Lambert – guitar on "Catherine Howard"
- Laura Lee – vocals on "Anne Boleyn"
- Sylvia McNeill – vocals on "Anne Boleyn"
- Judy Powell – vocals on "Catherine of Aragon"
- Frank Ricotti – percussion on "Anne of Cleves", "Catherine Howard", and "Catherine Parr"
- Chris Squire – bass guitar on "Catherine of Aragon"
- Barry St. John – vocals on "Catherine of Aragon"
- Liza Strike – vocals on "Catherine of Aragon" and "Anne Boleyn"
- Alan White – drums on "Anne of Cleves", "Jane Seymour", and "Catherine Parr"
- Dave Wintour – bass guitar on "Anne of Cleves" and "Catherine Parr"

=== Production and design ===
- Ken Scott – engineer on "Catherine of Aragon" and "Catherine Parr"
- Paul Tregurtha – engineer, mixer on "Anne of Cleves", "Catherine Howard", "Jane Seymour", and "Anne Boleyn"
- Pete Flanagan – assistant engineer
- David Hentschel (credited as "Dave Henshall") – mixer on "Catherine Parr"
- John Cleary – keyboards and amplification set-up
- Michael Tait – keyboards and amplification set-up
- Philip Hepple – keyboards and amplification set-up
- Claude Johnson Taylor – keyboards and amplification set-up
- Michael Doud – art director
- Ken Carroll – design
- Bruce Rae – cover photograph
- Ruan O'Lochlainn – inside photograph
- Rondor Music – publisher

== Charts ==
Chart (1973)	Peak position
Australian Albums (Kent Music Report)	9
Canada Top Albums/CDs (RPM)	27
Finnish Albums (The Official Finnish Charts)	23
Italian Albums (Musica e Dischi)	17
New Zealand Albums (RMNZ)	21
UK Albums (Official Charts)	7
US Billboard 200	30

== Certifications ==
Region	Certification	Certified units/sales
Australia (ARIA)	Gold	20,000^{^}
United States (RIAA)	Gold	500,000^{^}
^{^} Shipments figures based on certification alone.
