= Harriet Anne Smart =

British artist and composer (1817–1883)

Harriet Anne Smart Callow (20 October 1817 — 30 June 1883) was a British artist and composer who is best remembered for her hymns and her paintings of the British countryside. Her works were published under the names Harriet Smart and H. A. Callow.

Callow was born in London to the violinist Henry Smart and his wife Anne Stanton Bagnold Smart, a music teacher. Callow’s brother was the composer Henry Thomas Smart, and her uncle was Sir George Smart, the Queen’s organist. She studied painting with the artist William Callow, and married him in 1846.

The couple lived in Buckingshamshire after their marriage. In his autobiography, William Callow described his wife as “an excellent pianist and vocalist and. . . a good linguist.” She started a school in Buckingshamshire during the 1850s to teach the local laborers how to read, and also raised money to rebuild a church nearby in the village of Great Missenden. Sir William Jenner treated her unsuccessfully during her final illness in 1883. Her works include:

== Hymns ==
- “How Can We Serve Thee, Lord” (text by Claudia Frances Hernaman)
- “Shine Thou Upon Us, Lord” (text by Reverend John Ellerton)
- “Solitude”
- “Those Who With Dying Lips” (text by Esther Wiglesworth)

== Painting Collections ==
- Callow Album (by Harriet and William Callow)
- Chiltern Landscapes (by Harriet and William Callow)
- View two portraits attributed to Harriet Smart Callow
