= Newton Smith Fielding =

English painter and lithographer (1799–1856)

Newton Smith Fielding (1799–1856) was an English painter and lithographer.

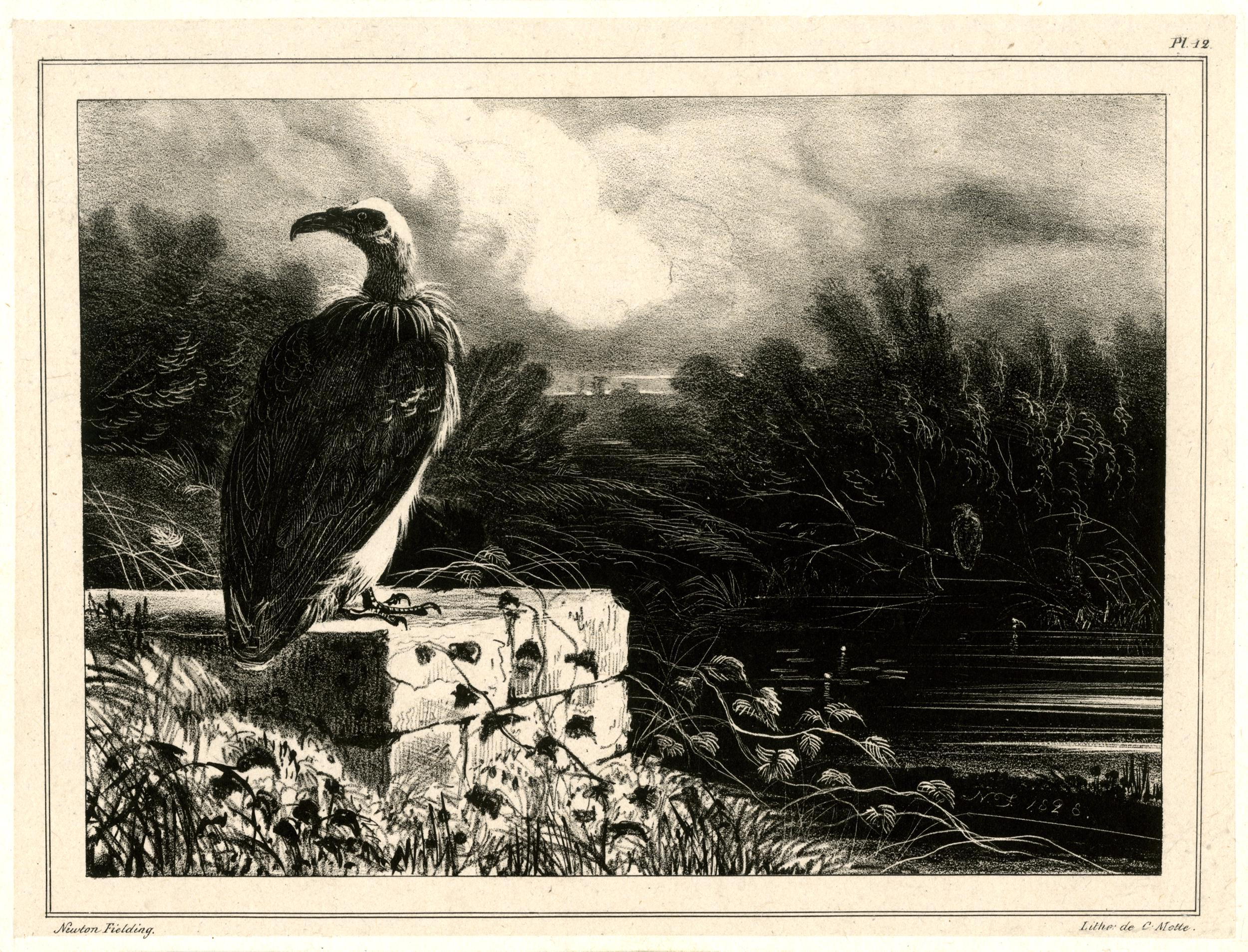
Lithograph of a vulture, 1828

== Life ==
Fielding was born in London in 1799, the youngest son of Nathan Theodore Fielding. He exhibited at the Society of Painters in Water-colours, showing some landscapes in 1815, and cattle pieces in 1818. He is best known for his paintings and engravings of animals. Besides painting in water-colours, he also made etchings, aquatints, and lithographs, becoming especially proficient in the last of these. He moved to Paris where he lived until his death, on 12 January 1856; he was much esteemed there, entering the 1827 Paris Salon and teaching the family of Louis-Philippe. In 1836 he published in London a set of Subjects after Nature, and in Paris he published sets of lithographs of animals, and illustrations to various works.

He also published Three Hundred Lessons; or, a Year's Instruction in Landscape Drawing, including Marine Subjects, with Hints on Perspective, (1852); Lessons on Fortification, with Plates, (1853); A Dictionary of Colour, containing Seven Hundred and Fifty Tints, to which is prefixed a Grammar of Colour, (1854); What to Sketch with; or, Hints on the Use of Coloured Crayons, Water-colours, Oil-colours, Black and White Chalks, Black-lead Pencil, and the Author's new Method of Preserving the Lights with Composition, (1856); and How to Sketch from Nature; or, Perspective and its Application, (2nd edit. 1856).
