= Thomas Shotter Boys =

English painter (1803–1874)

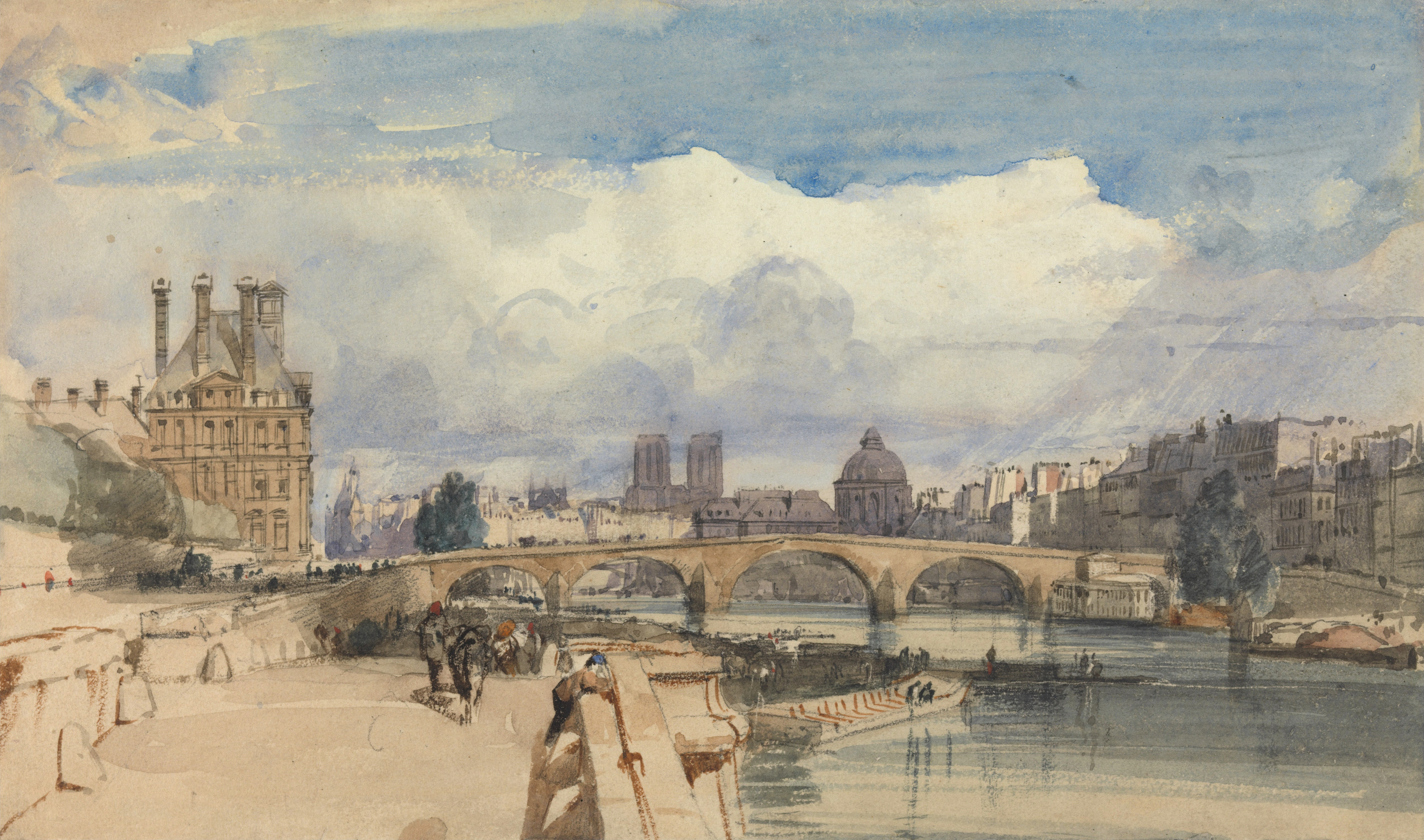
Le Pont Royal, Paris, watercolour, c. 1828, Yale Center for British Art

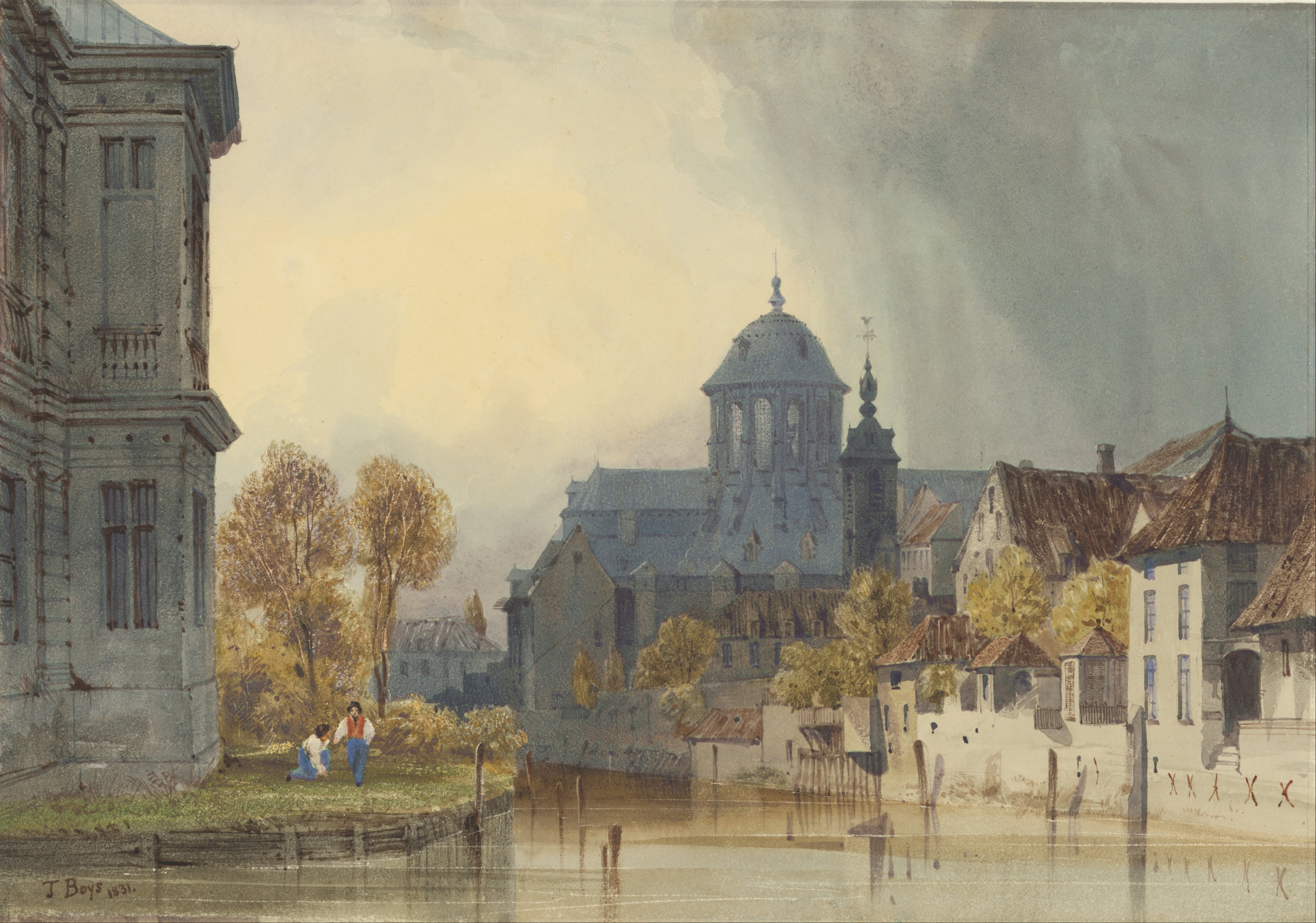
Church of Our Lady of Hanswijk, Mechelen, watercolour, 1831, Getty Museum

Thomas Shotter Boys (1803–1874) was an English watercolour painter and lithographer, mostly producing cityscapes and images of buildings, although he produced some rural landscapes and marine subjects.

== Life ==
Boys was born at Pentonville, London, on 2 January 1803. He was articled to the engraver George Cooke. When his apprenticeship came to an end he went to Paris where he met and came under the influence of Richard Parkes Bonington, who persuaded him to abandon engraving for painting. Some sources describe him as a pupil of Bonington, although William Callow, who later shared a studio with him in Paris, disputed this.

He exhibited at the Royal Academy for the first time in 1824, and in Paris in 1827. In 1830 he went to Brussels, but returned to England on the outbreak of the revolution there. Paying another visit to Paris, he remained there until 1837, and then returned to England in order to lithograph the works of David Roberts and Clarkson Stanfield.

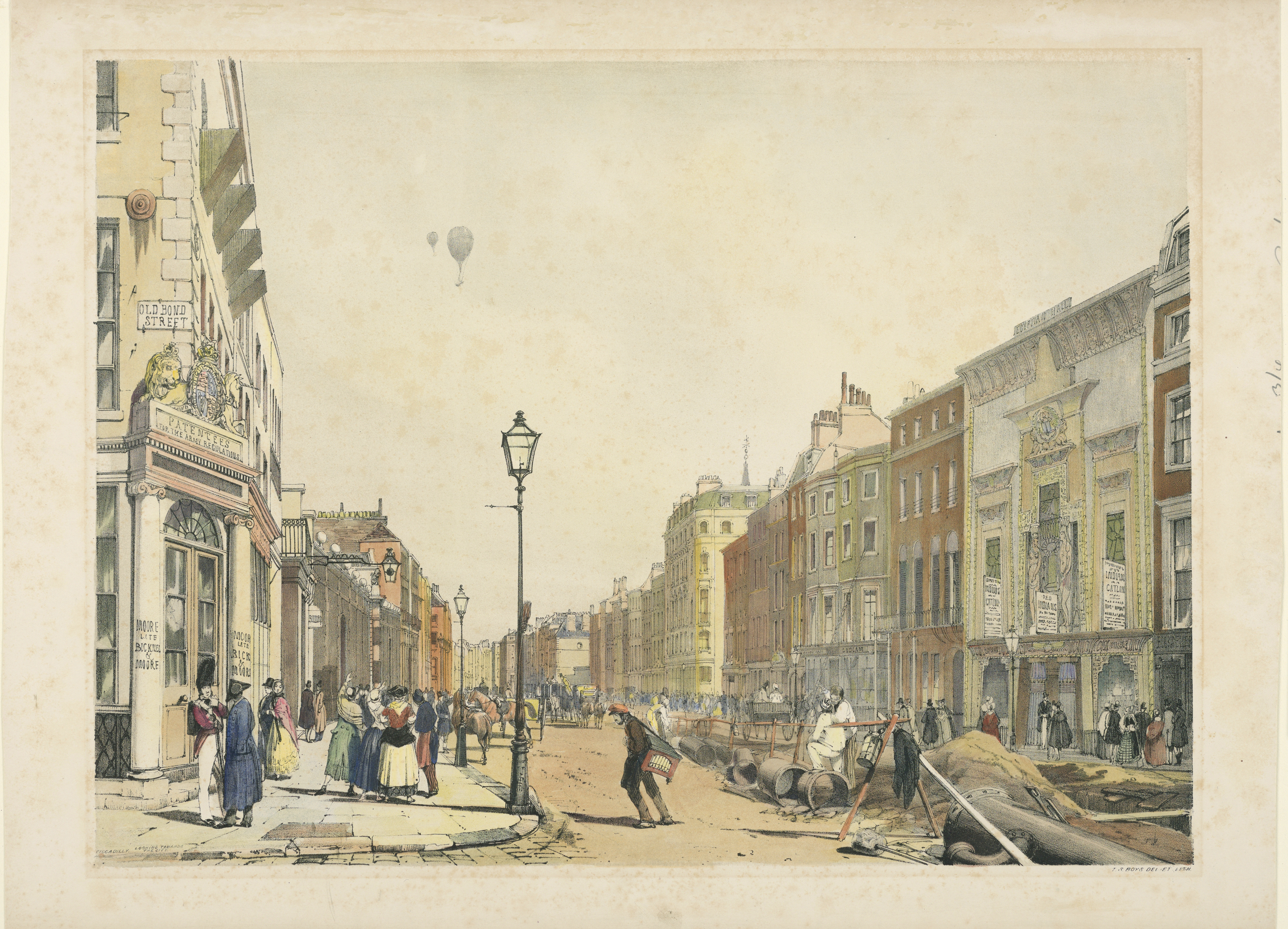
Piccadilly Looking Toward the City, c. 1840, one of his popular book of coloured lithographs of London.

His most important work, Picturesque Architecture in Paris, Ghent, Antwerp, Rouen, etc., a collection of colour lithographs, appeared in 1839, attracting a great deal of admiration. Drawn on the stone by Boys and printed by Charles Joseph Hullmandel, it was described in a review in the Polytechnic Journal as "the first successful effort in chroma-lithography [sic] hitherto brought to perfection." King Louis-Philippe sent the artist a ring in recognition of its merits. He also published Original Views of London as it is, drawn and lithographed by himself, (London, 1843). He drew the illustrations to Blackie's History of England, and etched some plates for John Ruskin's Stones of Venice.

Boys was a member of the Institute of Painters in Water Colours, and of several foreign artistic societies. He died in 1874.
