= St Clement (hymn tune) =

British hymn tune

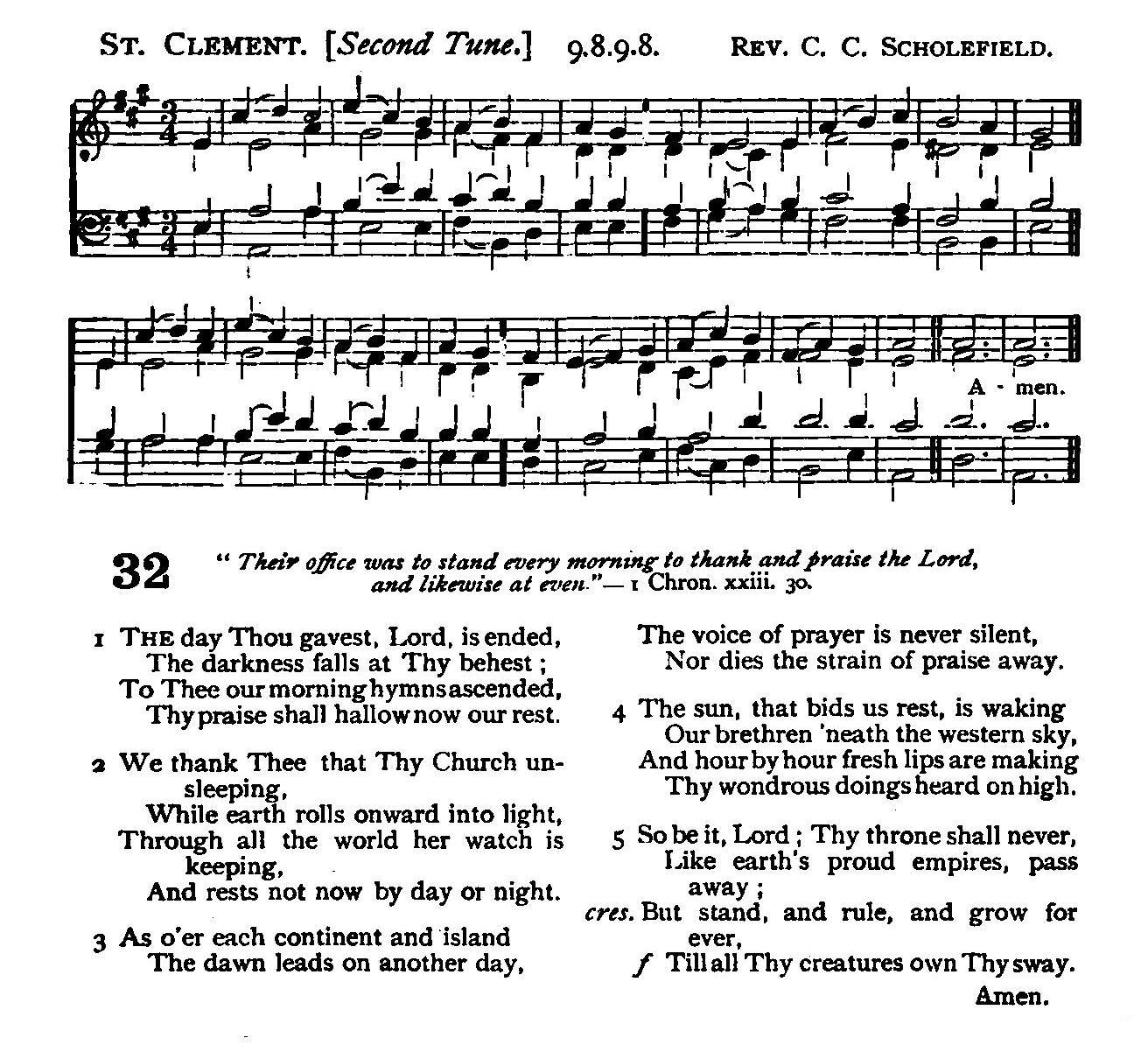
Original print of The day Thou gavest, Lord, is ended from Arthur Sullivan's Church hymns with tunes (1874)

St Clement is a popular British hymn tune, most commonly set to John Ellerton's hymn The Day Thou Gavest, Lord, is Ended. The tune is generally credited to the Rev. Clement Cotterill Scholefield (1839–1904). It first appeared in Sir Arthur Sullivan's Church Hymns with Tunes (1874). Scholefield was born at Edgbaston, Birmingham, and was the youngest son of William Scholefield, MP for Birmingham.

However, in 2000 the Rev. Ian Bradley, reader in Church History and Practical Theology at St Andrews University and author of The Daily Telegraph Book of Hymns, wrote of a connection between Sullivan, who composed the music for Gilbert and Sullivan's comic operas and many hymns, among other works both sacred and secular, and Scholefield. "The two men were good friends while Sullivan was organist at St Peter's Church, South Kensington, from 1867 to 1872". In his book, Bradley writes:

In an article in the Hymn Society Bulletin in 1994 Mervyn Horder, himself a hymn-tune composer, suggested that 'Sullivan almost certainly had a larger hand in St Clement than has been or can ever definitely be, credited to him.' His starting-point was that this tune stands head and shoulders above the quality of Scholefield's other work. None of the 41 other hymn-tunes penned by this self-taught musician show anything like the craftsmanship, originality or melodic sweep of St Clement.

— Bradley (2005, page 126)

Critics of the tune have included Ralph Vaughan Williams, W.H. Frere, the 1897 editor of Hymns Ancient and Modern, and the former archbishop of Canterbury, Cosmo Gordon Lang the latter of whom described it in The Times as a "feeble waltz tune".

Clement Scholefield was educated at Pocklington Grammar School and, after three years at St John's College, Cambridge, he was ordained a deacon in 1867 and a priest in 1869 in the Church of England. From 1869 until 1879, Scholefield served at Hove parish church, St. Peter's in Kensington, as well as a brief tenure at St Luke's Church, Chelsea. He spent the ten years to 1890 as chaplain at Eton College before becoming vicar at Holy Trinity, Knightsbridge, for five years. In 1895 he retired from clergy ministry and devoted his time to various pursuits including music, of which he was particularly fond. He had no systematic musical training but he was an accomplished pianist. He wrote other songs but is remembered for his hymn tunes St Clement and Irene. After his death his estate was administered by the Court of Chancery, and, pending an order being made, the executors were for some time obliged to refuse all applications for the use of St Clement.

The tune was used as a theme for the Anne Boleyn section of Rick Wakeman's 1973 concept album, The Six Wives of Henry VIII.

== "The day Thou gavest, Lord, is ended" ==
St Clement appears as an alternative setting for the hymn in the 1906 English Hymnal. It is the second tune for No. 667, "The day Thou gavest, Lord, is ended" (John Ellerton, 1826–1893) in the 1933 Methodist Hymn Book. In the 1929 Revised Church Hymnary No. 289, (which also incorporates in many editions the Scottish Psalter), it is the third tune for the same hymn. The arrangement and key (A major) is the same in both hymnbooks.

The tune, with two different translations of Ellerton's text, is also included in German official hymnals, the current Protestant hymnal Evangelisches Gesangbuch (EG) and the Catholic (Gotteslob, 2013, No. 96).

The hymn was used in the State Funeral of Her Majesty Queen Elizabeth II Monday, 19 September 2022, in Westminster Abbey.
