= The Six Wives of Henry VIII Live at Hampton Court Palace =

The Six Wives of Henry VIII: Live at Hampton Court Palace

Live album by Rick Wakeman
- Released: 5 October 2009
- Recorded: 1 and 2 May 2009
- Venues: Hampton Court Palace, Richmond upon Thames, London
- Genres: Progressive rock; instrumental rock; symphonic rock
- Length: 79:39 (CD); 108:21 (DVD/Blu-Ray)
- Labels: Eagle Records (CD); Eagle Vision (DVD)
- Producer: Rick Wakeman

Rick Wakeman chronology
Retro 2 (2007)	The Six Wives of Henry VIII: Live at Hampton Court Palace (2009)	Always with You (2010)

The Six Wives of Henry VIII Live at Hampton Court Palace is a live album and video by English keyboardist Rick Wakeman, released on 5 October 2009 by Eagle Records. It documents Wakeman's concerts on 1 and 2 May 2009 at Hampton Court Palace that featured his 1973 progressive rock concept album The Six Wives of Henry VIII performed in its entirety for the first time. A DVD and Blu-ray edition of the concerts was released.

The shows were staged as part of the palace's celebrations for the 500th anniversary of Henry VIII's accession to the throne. Each track from the original album was rearranged for a band, orchestra, and choir, plus three pieces written specifically for the concerts, including "Defender of the Faith", a track Wakeman wrote for the original album but was not recorded. Wakeman performs with a six-piece rock band, the Orchestra Europa, and the English Chamber Choir conducted by Guy Protheroe.

== Background ==
In January 1973, Wakeman's solo album The Six Wives of Henry VIII, was released on A&M Records. It is an instrumental progressive rock album based on his interpretations of the musical characteristics of the wives of Henry VIII. It reached No. 9 in the UK and No. 30 in the US. Around the time of its release, Wakeman and his manager Brian Lane requested permission to perform the album live at Hampton Court Palace, but they were denied permission and Wakeman recalled: "I got the impression that what I had asked was tantamount to treason". Despite Lane suggesting other venues, such as the Royal Albert Hall, Wakeman wanted to stage it at Hampton Court or abandon the project.

In 2008, 35 years later, Wakeman was invited to stage a concert at Hampton Court Palace and perform The Six Wives of Henry VIII as part of the palace's celebrations in 2009 for the 500th anniversary of Henry VIII's accession to the throne. This marked the first time the album was to be performed in its entirety. Wakeman accepted, and work on planning the concerts began in December of that same year. Funding the production was an issue from the start as the sponsors, all banks, collapsed from the 2008 financial crisis and pulled out. Despite the setback Wakeman and the various management agreed to continue with the shows, given the one chance to stage them for the 500th anniversary year, and used sales from tickets, merchandise, television rights, albums, and videos to help fund and produce it. From January to the end of April 2009, Wakeman and the production crew worked "flat-out" on the shows.

== Concerts ==
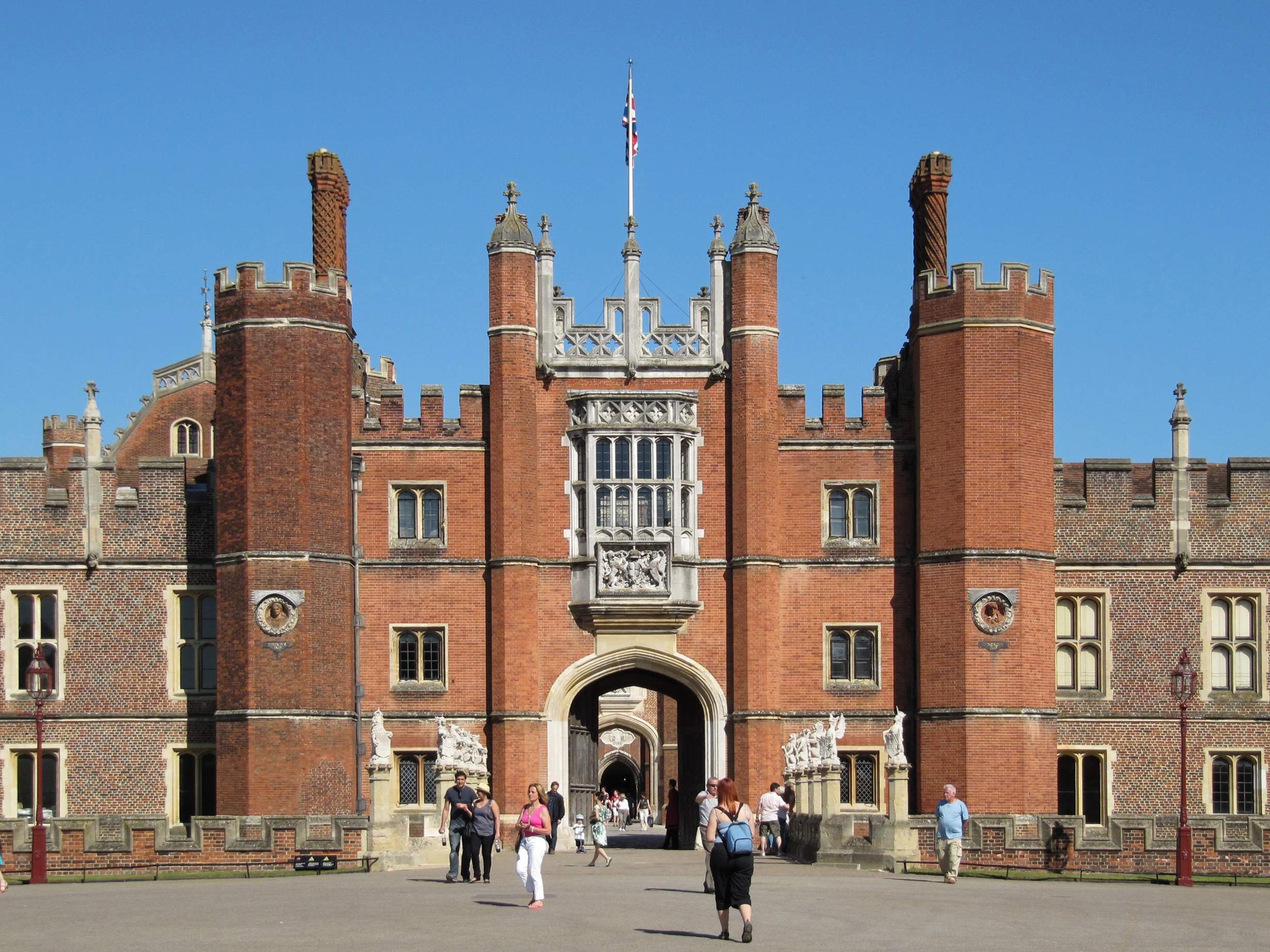
An arena was built outside the West Gate to stage the concerts

The two concerts were held on 1 and 2 May 2009, both of which sold out. A temporary concert arena was built outside the palace's West Gate which accommodated 5,000 people, and featured screens for the audience to watch plus a suspended church organ and piano. Both shows opened with two acoustic groups including the folk rock group Strawbs, of which Wakeman was a member in 1970 and 1971. Wakeman entered the stage with six actresses dressed as each of the wives.

The programme opened with "Tudorture '1485'", one of the two original pieces written specifically for the event and links the main themes from the tracks dedicated to the wives. Blessed introduced each subsequent piece with a scripted narrative, giving biographical information on each individual. "Defender of the Faith" is based on two main themes that Wakeman wrote for a track on Henry VIII himself that was to be recorded for the original album, but scrapped due to the insufficient space on the vinyl. The encore, "Tudorock", is another original piece and features Wakeman and his son Adam taking centre stage with a keytar duet, which they had done since the Wakeman with Wakeman Tour in 1992.

The two shows were recorded, a 2-CD copy of which was available for attendees to purchase at the end of each performance. Wakeman said that the general release CD and subsequent video was what was performed on the second night, with no overdubs added or parts removed in post-production.

== Reception ==
Professional ratings
Review scores
Source	Rating
Classic Rock	(DVD)
Record Collector	4/5 stars

== Track listing ==
Note: The CD edition omits Blessed's narrations, "Henry's Fanfare", and "Jane's Prelude".

=== CD ===
No.	Title	Length
1.	"Tudorture "1485""	7:11
2.	"Catherine of Aragon (2009)"	5:45
3.	"Kathryn Howard (2009)"	12:09
4.	"Jane Seymour (2009)"	6:44
5.	"Defender of the Faith"	10:15
6.	"Katherine Parr (2009)"	12:02
7.	"Anne of Cleves (2009)"	8:27
8.	"Anne Boleyn (2009)"	10:12
9.	"Tudorock"	6:50

=== DVD and Blu-ray ===
No.	Title	Length
1.	"Henry's Fanfare"	2:01
2.	"Tudorture "1485""	9:25
3.	"Catherine of Aragon (2009)"	8:35
4.	"Kathryn Howard (2009)"	15:07
5.	"Jane's Prelude"	1:01
6.	"Jane Seymour (2009)"	8:30
7.	"Defender of the Faith"	13:06
8.	"Katherine Parr (2009)"	15:21
9.	"Anne of Cleves (2009)"	11:46
10.	"Anne Boleyn (2009)"	14:18
11.	"Tudorock"	7:22
12.	"Tudorture "1485""	1:49

== Personnel ==
Band

- Rick Wakeman – keyboards, keytar
- Dave Colquhoun – electric guitar
- Jonathan Noyce – bass guitar
- Adam Wakeman – additional keyboards, keytar
- Tony Fernandez – drums
- Ray Cooper – percussion
- Pete Rinaldi – acoustic guitar

Orchestra

- Guy Protheroe – conductor, orchestrations, musical director
- Orchestra Europa

Choir

- English Chamber Choir

Other personnel

- Brian Blessed – narrator
- Ann Manly – orchestrations

Production

- Rick Wakeman – producer, liner notes
- Lyn Beardsall – film producer
- Robert Garofalo – film director
- Joanne Garofalo – associate producer
- Scott Ellaway – artistic director
- Nikkie Amouyal – packaging
- John Spence – photography
- Tom Dean – product manager
- Keith Morris – production manager
