= John Ellerton =

Hymnodist, editor and translator

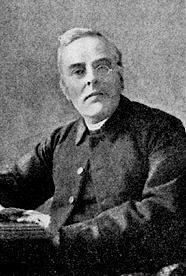

Background information
- Born: 16 December 1826; Clerkenwell, Middlesex, England
- Died: 15 June 1893 (aged 66)
- Occupation(s): Chaplain, hymodist, hymnologist

John Ellerton (16 December 1826 – 15 June 1893) was a hymnodist and hymnologist.

== Life ==
He was born in Clerkenwell, Middlesex, England, to George Ellerton, the head of an evangelical family. He was educated at King William's College on the Isle of Man, and Trinity College, Cambridge (B.A. 1849; M.A. 1854), where he came under the influence of F. D. Maurice. He died in Torquay, Devon, England, aged 66.

== Service ==
Taking orders in 1850, he was curate of Easebourne, Sussex. In 1852, he was in Brighton and lecturer of St. Peter's, Brighton.

In 1860, he became chaplain for Lord Crewe and vicar of Crewe Green in Cheshire, about thirty miles southeast of Liverpool. He became chairman of the education committee at the Mechanics Institute for the local Railway Company. Reorganizing the institute, he made it one of the most successful in England. He taught classes in English and Bible history. He also organised one of the first choral associations of the Midlands.

In 1872, he became rector of Hinstock, Shropshire. In 1876, he was transferred to Barnes, (then in Surrey), a western suburb of London. The work among a large population broke him down and he had to go abroad for a year, serving as chaplain at Pegli in Italy from 1884 to 1885. After returning, he took a smaller parish in White Roding in 1886, his last. During his final illness, he was given the honorary title of Canon of St. Albans Cathedral.

== Published works ==
Ellerton was best known as a hymnologist, editor, hymn-writer and translator. He published Hymns for Schools and Bible Classes in Brighton in 1859. He was co-editor with William Walsham How and others of the Society for Promoting Christian Knowledge (SPCK) Church Hymns, 1871. His Notes and Illustrations of Church Hymns were published in the folio edition of 1881.

=== Hymns ===
Ellerton wrote or translated eighty-six or more hymns, including

- Our day of praise is done
- Saviour, again to thy dear name we raise
- Shine Thou Upon Us, Lord (music by Harriet Anne Smart)
- The day thou gavest, Lord, is ended

== Notes ==
- Julian, John (June 1907). A Dictionary of Hymnology. London: John Murray. pp. 826–828.
- Bailey, Albert Edward (1950). The Gospel in Hymns. New York: Charles Scribner's sons. pp. 424–430.
- "King William's College Register".
