= The day thou gavest, Lord, is ended =

Christian evening hymn

- by John Ellerton
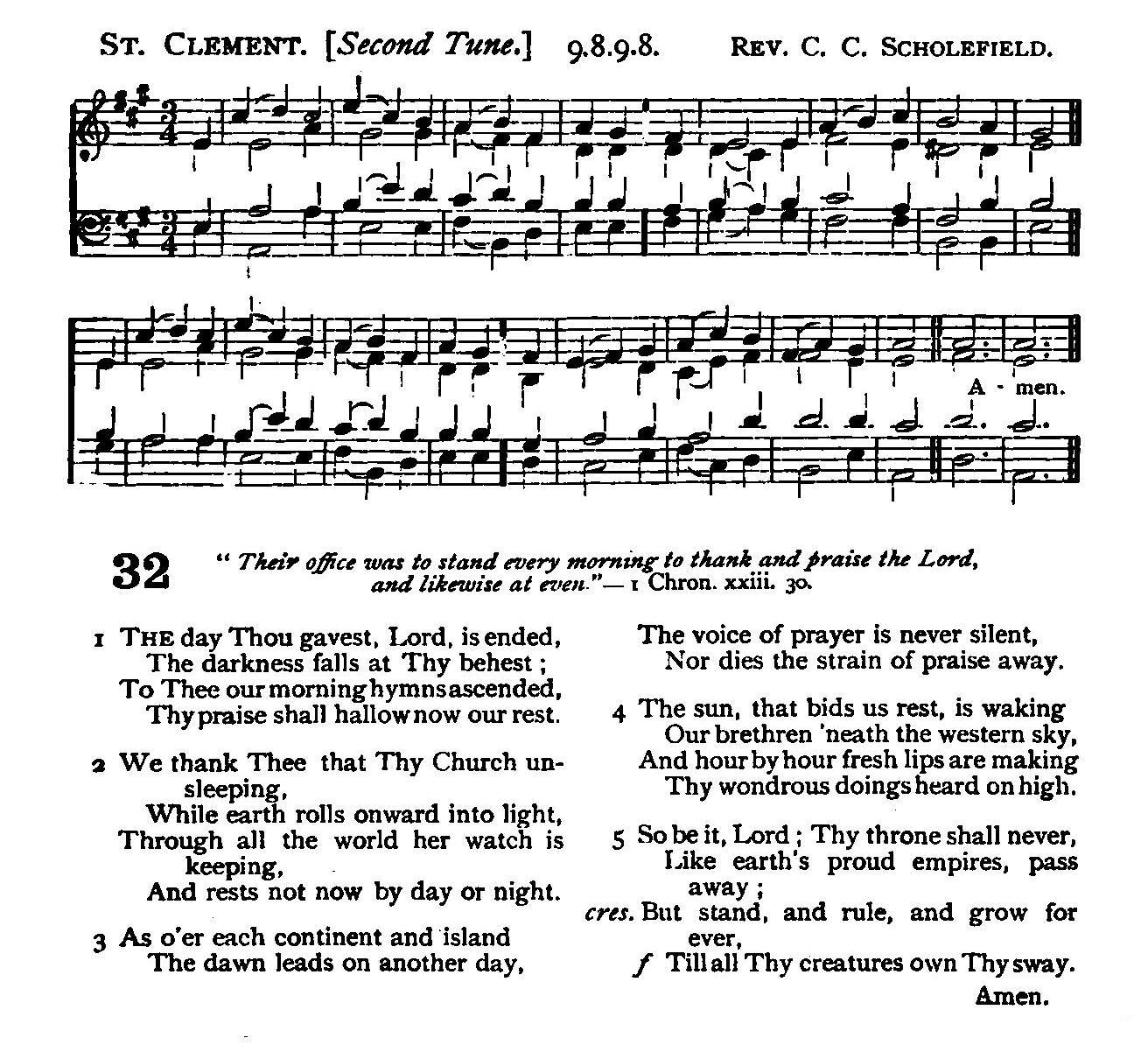
- Original print of The day Thou gavest, Lord, is ended from Arthur Sullivan's Church hymns with tunes (1874)
- Melody: St Clement
- Composed: 1870

"The day thou gavest, Lord, is ended" is a Christian hymn written by the Anglican hymnodist the Reverend John Ellerton (1826–1893) in 1870 for its inclusion in A Liturgy for Missionary Meetings. It is often sung to the tune of St Clement and its theme focuses on the worldwide fellowship of the church and its continual offering of prayer and praise to God.

The hymn was selected to be sung as part of the celebrations for the Diamond Jubilee of Queen Victoria in 1897 and was also sung at the Hong Kong handover ceremony a century later. It was also sung at the funeral of Queen Elizabeth II on 19 September 2022.

The hymn has an enduring popularity, coming in third place in a BBC Songs of Praise poll of favourite hymns in 2005.

Two different translations of Ellerton's text are included in German official hymnals, the current Protestant hymnal Evangelisches Gesangbuch (EG) and the Catholic (Gotteslob, 2013, No. 96).
