= Thales Fielding =

English painter

Thales Fielding (1793–1837) was an English watercolour painter.

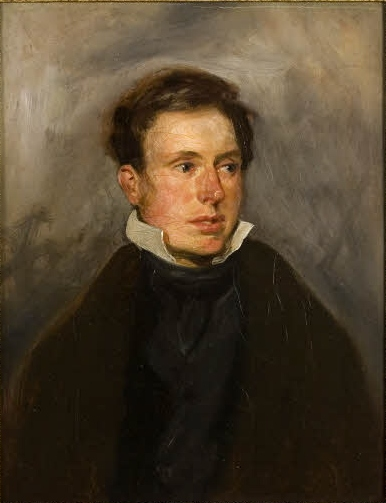
Thales Fielding, portrait by Eugène Delacroix.

== Life ==
Fielding was the third son of Nathan Theodore Fielding, and like his brothers is mainly known as a painter in watercolours. He was an associate exhibitor of the Royal Society of Painters in Water-colours, and for some years teacher of drawing at the Royal Military Academy, Woolwich. In 1818 he appears as settled at 26 Newman Street, London, where he resided until his death, which occurred after a few hours' illness on 20 December 1837, at the age of forty-four.

== Works ==
He seems to have first exhibited at the British Institution in 1816, sending 'A View of Saddleback, Cumberland,' but there is some difficulty at first in distinguishing his works from those of his elder brother, Theodore H. A. Fielding. He exhibited numerous landscapes and cattle-pieces, mostly compositions, at the Royal Academy and at the British Institution. His last picture, in 1837, was 'A View of Caerphilly Castle, Glamorganshire.' He also painted portraits.

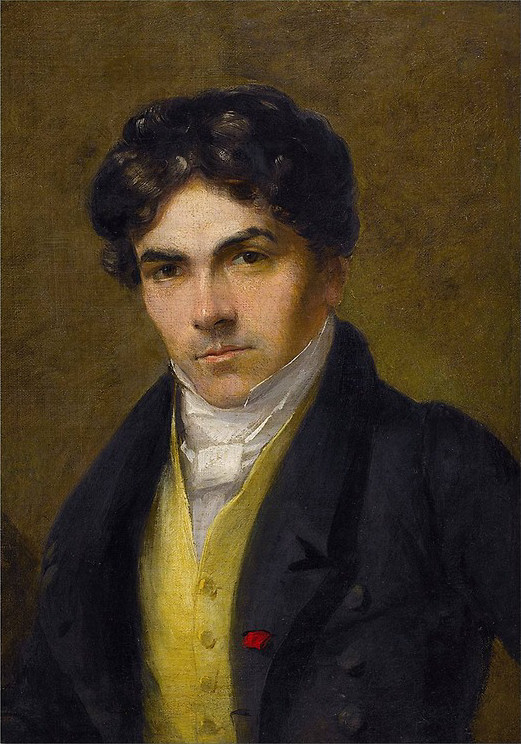
Portrait of Eugène Delacroix.

In 1827 he exhibited a portrait of Eugène Delacroix at the Royal Academy, one of a pair the artists made of each other, and a portrait by him of Peter Barlow was published in lithography by Graf & Soret.
