= Copley Fielding =

English painter (1787–1855)

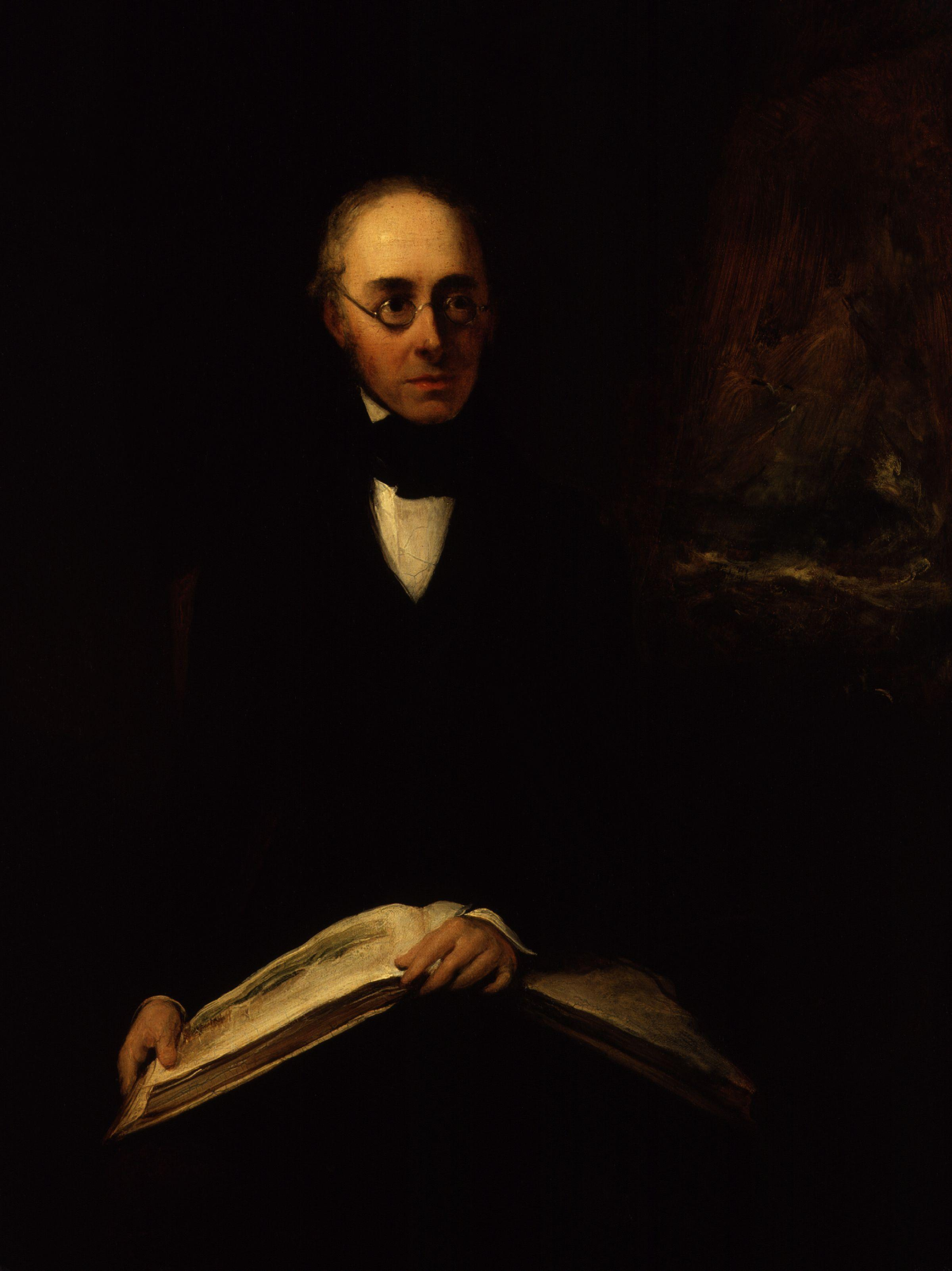
Antony Vandyke Copley Fielding by William Boxall (exhibited 1843)

Anthony Vandyke Copley Fielding (22 November 1787 – 3 March 1855), commonly called Copley Fielding, was an English painter born in Sowerby, near Halifax, and famous for his watercolour landscapes. At an early age Fielding became a pupil of John Varley. In 1810 he became an associate exhibitor in the Old Water-colour Society, in 1813 a full member and in 1831 President of that body (later known as the Royal Society of Watercolours), until his death. He won a gold medal at the Paris Salon of 1824 alongside Richard Parkes Bonington and John Constable. He also engaged largely in teaching the art and made ample profits. He later moved to Park Crescent in Worthing and died in the town in March 1855.

Copley Fielding was a painter of much elegance, taste and accomplishment and has always been highly popular with purchasers. He painted a vast number of all sorts of views (occasionally in oil-colour) including marine subjects. Examples of his work is held by the Victoria and Albert Museum and other major museums in Britain. Among the engraved specimens of his art is the Annual of British Landscape Scenery, published in 1839.

== Gallery ==
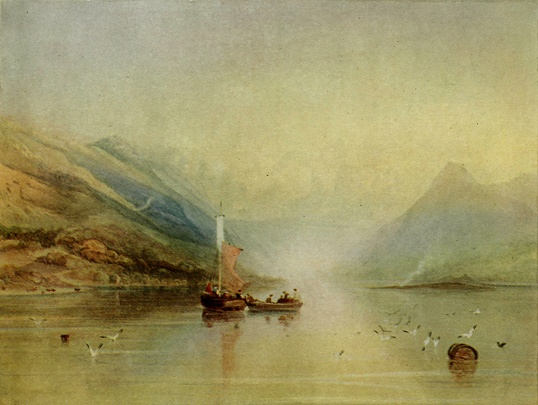
Lake Scene by Copley Fielding

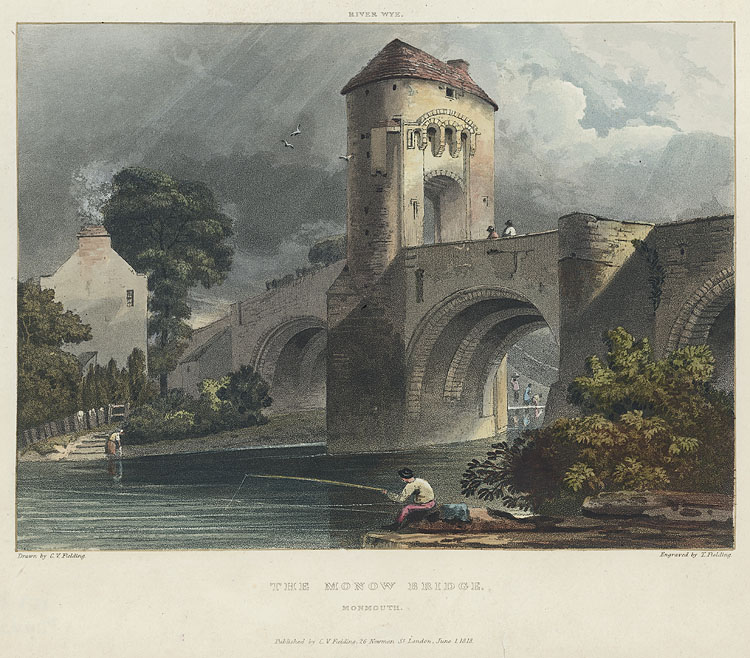
The Monow Bridge, Monmouth by Copley Fielding, engraved by T. Fielding.
