= Theodore Henry Adolphus Fielding =

English painter

Theodore Henry Adolphus Fielding (1781 – 11 July 1851) was an English painter, engraver, and author.

== Life ==
Fielding was the eldest son of Nathan Theodore Fielding. Like his brothers Copley and Thales he painted in watercolours, and in 1799 sent to the Royal Academy A View of the North Tyne, near Billingham, Northumberland. In 1814 he sent to the British Institution A Sleeping Bacchus. He continued to exhibit at both exhibitions, but it is sometimes difficult to distinguish his works from those of his younger brother, Thales Fielding.

In 1826 he was appointed teacher of drawing and perspective at the East India Company's Military Seminary at Addiscombe. He was popular with the cadets, and was nicknamed "Johnny Bleu" (from his Frenchified pronunciation of that colour).

He lived near Addiscombe, at Croydon, until his death on 11 July 1851, at the age of seventy.

== Works ==
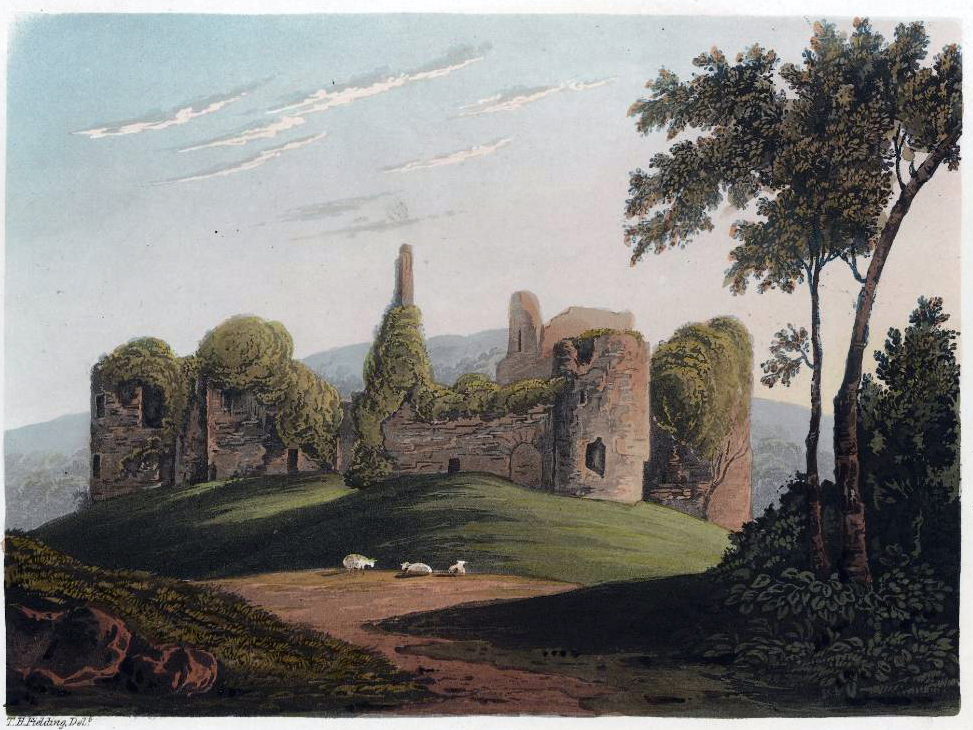
Depiction of the Grosmont Castle in 1823, by Theodore Fielding

In addition to his watercolours, Fielding also worked in stipple and aquatint, and published numerous sets of engravings in the latter technique, including illustrations to Excursion sur les côtes et dans les ports de Normandie, after Bonington and others; Cumberland, Westmoreland, and Lancashire Illustrated (44 plates, 1822); A Series of Views in the West Indies (1827); Ten Aquatint Coloured Engravings from a work containing 48 Subjects of Landscape Scenery, principally Views in or near Bath, painted by Benjamin Barker (1824); British Castles; or, a Compendious History of the Ancient Military Structures of Great Britain (1825); A Picturesque Tour of the River Wye, from its Source to its Junction with the Severn, from Drawings by Copley Fielding.

== Writings ==
Fielding published several works on the technical aspects of art:

- On Painting in Oil and Water-colours for Landscape or Portraits (1830).
- Index of Colours and Mixed Tints (1830).
- On the Theory of Painting (1836).
- Synopsis of Practical Perspective, lineal and aerial, with Remarks on Sketching from Nature (1829).
- The Knowledge and Restoration of Oil-paintings, the Modes of Judging between Copies and Originals, and a brief Life of the principal Masters in the different Schools of Painting (1847).
- The Art of Engraving, with the various Modes of Operation (1844); this was mostly reprinted in Robert Hoe's edition of Joseph Maberly's Print Collector (1880).
