= Piano Concerto (Vaughan Williams) =

Vaughan Williams c. 1920

The Piano Concerto in C is a concertante work by Ralph Vaughan Williams written in 1926 (movements 1 and 2) and 1930–31 (movement 3). During the intervening years, the composer completed Job: A Masque for Dancing and began work on his Fourth Symphony. The concerto shares some thematic characteristics with these works, as well as some of their drama and turbulence.

== Structure ==
The concerto has three movements:

1. Toccata: Allegro moderato – Largamente – Cadenza
2. Romanza: Lento
3. Fuga chromatica con Finale alla Tedesca

The concerto begins with driving, energetic music from the soloist set against a threatening, rising theme in the orchestra. A faster, more scherzo-like idea, shared out equally between piano and orchestra, soon contrasts against the opening music. These two blocks of music alternate, forming the basis of the entire movement. It is as though the traditional dialogue between soloist and orchestra has been supplanted by a more generalised dialogue of musical types. At the movement's climax, a brief and thunderous piano solo is joined by the full orchestra. However, the orchestra suddenly cuts off to leave the piano musing alone in a short lyrical cadenza. This leads without a break into the slow movement.

The romanza is more delicate, providing the listener with hints of Vaughan Williams's previous studies with Maurice Ravel. Vaughan Williams here quoted the theme from the Epilogue of the third movement of Arnold Bax's Symphony No. 3.

Again without a pause from the previous music, the closing movement begins with a fugue that is linked to a waltz finale by flights of virtuosity from the piano soloist. It closes with the ensemble repeating themes from the first two movements, and then abruptly closes

== Overview ==
The work was premiered on 1 February 1933 by Harriet Cohen, with the BBC Symphony Orchestra directed by Sir Adrian Boult. The Finale was edited shortly thereafter and the work was published in 1936. The concerto was not well received at first, being considered unrewarding to the soloist. Though the piece provides ample opportunity for virtuosity in all movements, Vaughan Williams treated the piano as a percussion instrument, as did Béla Bartók and Paul Hindemith during this period, with the texture at times impenetrably thick.

While the concerto was rated highly by some—Bartók, for one, was extremely impressed—Vaughan Williams took the advice of well-meaning friends and colleagues and reworked the piece into a Concerto for Two Pianos and Orchestra, adding more texture to the piano parts with the assistance of Joseph Cooper in 1946.

== Bibliography ==
- Achenbach, Andrew, Notes for EMI 75983, Vaughan Williams: Piano Concerto; Delius: Piano Concerto; Finzi: Eclogue; Piers Lane, piano; Royal Liverpool Philharmonic Orchestra conducted by Vernon Handley.
- Max Harrison. Symphony #9 and Piano Concerto CD Booklet. Chandos Records.
- Kennedy, Michael, The Works of Ralph Vaughan Williams (Oxford and New York: Oxford University Press, 1964). ISBN n/a.
