= Charles Mott (baritone) =

British opera singer

Charles James Mott (24 October 1879 – 22 May 1918) was an English baritone.

== Biography ==
Charles James Mott was born in Hornsey, North London, the son of Henry Isaac Mott, a surveyor's clerk, and Eliza Brockley, a singing teacher. He was one of a large family. His early music was as a choirboy at St. James' Church in Muswell Hill. When he left school he took a clerical job like his brothers, and he became a bank clerk, where he was well known for his habit of singing to himself as he worked. After work he studied singing with Josiah Booth and Henry Stanley, before being spotted by Baron Frederic d'Erlanger who sent him to study with Paul Knupfer in Berlin. A year later, such was his progress that Knupfer arranged an audition with the Hofoper at Dessau leading to his becoming principal baritone.

At the age of 25 Charles returned to Britain to continue studying with Clara Novello Davies. His chance to sing publicly in England came when he was invited to share the stage with a new tenor, John McCormack. In 1909 he was given supporting roles at the Royal Opera, before being given the part of Méru in Meyerbeer's Les Huguenots, singing with Luisa Tetrazzini. In 1912 he sang in the Wagner Festival in Budapest, and the next year at the Edinburgh Festival. Early in 1913 he participated in an unsuccessful production of Raymond Roze's Joan of Arc, but later that year he was fortunate in playing leading roles more to his liking in Wagner's Tristan und Isolde, Lohengrin and Bizet's Carmen. Early in 1912 Mott sang the part of the Second Knight of the Grail in The Royal Opera's Festival of German Opera production of Wagner's Parsifal – this was the first English production, though sung in German. Following Parsifal, Mott sang in Tristan, Meistersinger and Götterdämmerung.

In 1914 the English composer Sir Edward Elgar attended the Festival, expecting to hear Tristan, but instead of that the curtain rose on Meistersinger in which Mott by chance took August Kiess's part of Kothner. Mott would have been singing the part of the Nachtigall, but Kiess was indisposed. Elgar was impressed by Mott's voice, praised him personally and remembering him later, recommended him for the part of the Priest in his Gerontius.

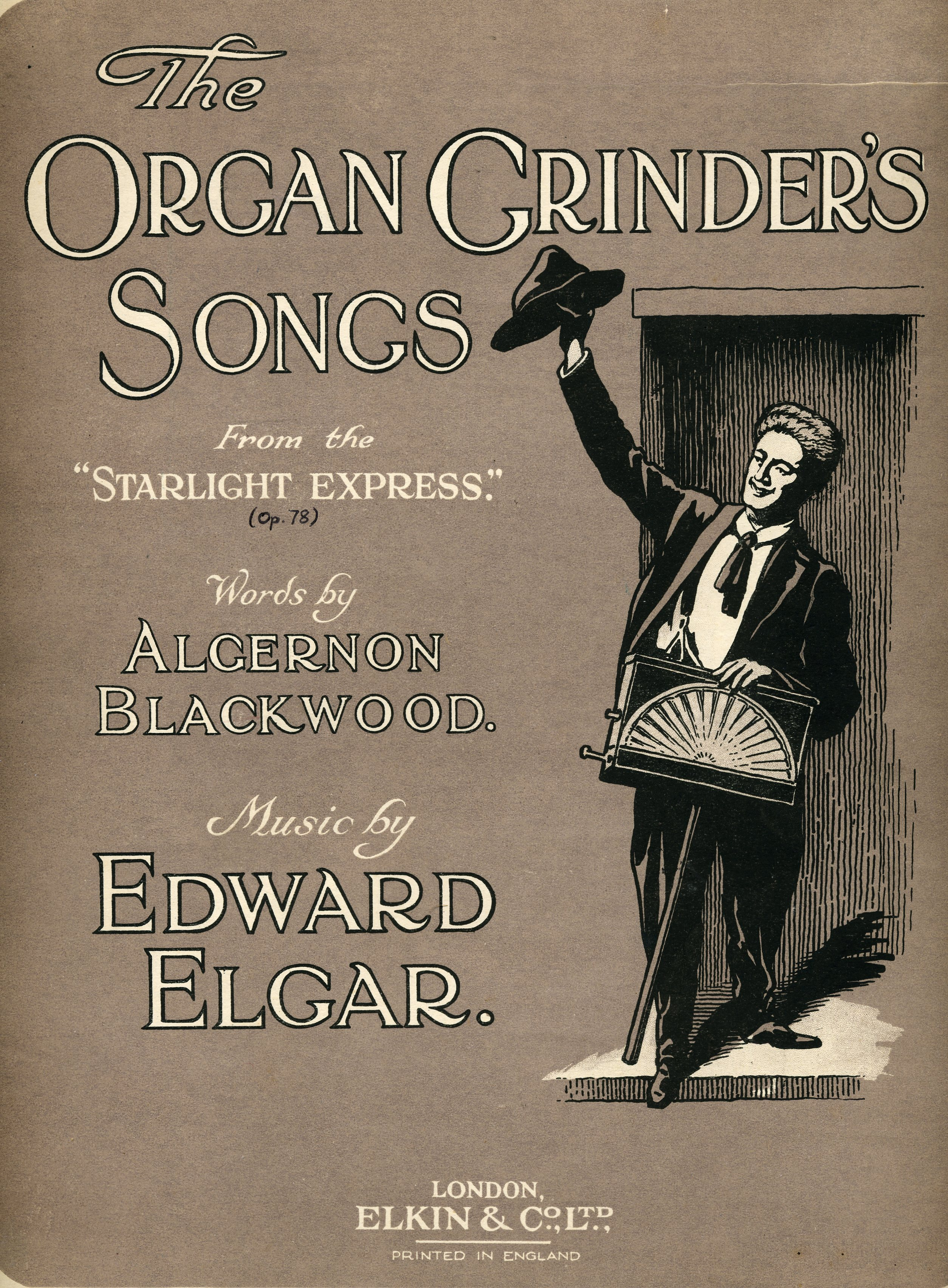
Charles Mott – as the Organ Grinder in Elgar's The Starlight Express

Elgar invited Mott to play the key role of The Organ Grinder in Lena Ashwell's production of The Starlight Express at the Kingsway Theatre, and this was followed by successful performances in Elgar's song cycle on Kipling's poems The Fringes of the Fleet. In 1916 Mott played the part of the Angel of the Agony in Gerontius, alongside Clara Butt and Gervase Elwes, with the composer conducting. There was a run of six performances at Queen's Hall from 8 May and a gala performance on 19 May in the presence of the King and Queen. At the end of that year he sang in Coleridge-Taylor's exotic Scenes of Hiawatha.

He was conscripted into the British Army and joined the Artists Rifles. On 20 May 1918, during the Third Battle of the Aisne, whilst on active service with his comrades in Aveluy Woods, he was mortally wounded by enemy fire. He died of his wounds two days later. There were other singers in the regiment, and he was fondly remembered by one of them, Roy Henderson, for his popularity, unconventionality and light-heartedness. Lance-Corporal Charles James Mott was buried in grave 2, plot 11, row C of Bagneux British Cemetery, south of Gezaincourt (Somme), France. Elgar wrote to a friend:"It is difficult to believe that Charles Mott is dead; dead of wounds in France. I am overwhelmed: a simple, honest GOOD soul."

== Recordings ==
Mott made recordings of The Starlight Express and The Fringes of the Fleet.

- On 18 February 1916, a selection of the songs and music of Elgar's The Starlight Express was recorded at the His Master's Voice studios, Hayes, by The Gramophone Company. The singers were Charles Mott and Agnes Nicholls, with Elgar conducting the orchestra. There were eight 12-inch records: (1) To the Children; (2) The Blue-Eyes Fairy; (3) My Old Tunes; (4) Curfew Song; (5) Come Little Winds and Wind Dance (orchestra); (6) Tears and Laughter and Sunrise Song; (7) The Laugher's Song; (8) Finale – Hearts must be soft-shiny dressed (duet).

== See also ==
- George Butterworth – (English composer, killed in action in 1916)
