= Musical quotation =

Incorporation of a relatively brief segment of existing music in another work

Musical quotation is the practice of directly quoting another work in a new composition. The quotation may be from the same composer's work (self-referential), or from a different composer's work (appropriation).

Sometimes the quotation is done for the purposes of characterization, as in Puccini's use of The Star-Spangled Banner in reference to the American character Lieutenant Pinkerton in his opera Madama Butterfly, or in Tchaikovsky's use of the Russian and French national anthems in the 1812 Overture, which depicted a battle between the Russian and French armies.

Sometimes, there is no explicit characterization involved, as when Luciano Berio used brief quotes from Johann Sebastian Bach, Ludwig van Beethoven, Alban Berg, Pierre Boulez, Gustav Mahler, Claude Debussy, Paul Hindemith, Maurice Ravel, Arnold Schoenberg, Karlheinz Stockhausen, Richard Strauss, Igor Stravinsky, Anton Webern, and others in his Sinfonia.

== Quotation vs. variation ==
Musical quotation is to be distinguished from variation, where a composer takes a theme (their own or another's) and writes variations on it. In that case, the origin of the theme is usually acknowledged in the title (e.g., Johannes Brahms's Variations on a Theme by Haydn).

In the case of quotations, however, an explicit acknowledgment does not generally appear in the score. Some exceptions are found in Robert Schumann's Carnaval:

- in the section "Florestan" he quotes a theme from his earlier work Papillons, Op. 2, and the inscription "(Papillon?)" is written underneath the notes (he quotes the same theme in the final section "Marche des Davidsbündler contre les Philistins", but without acknowledgement)
- in the final section, he also quotes another theme first used in Papillons, the traditional Grossvater Tanz (Grandfather Dance), but this time the inscription is "Thème du XVIIème siècle".

== Examples ==
Examples of musical quotations in classical music include:

- Arnold Bax quoted a theme from Richard Wagner's opera Tristan und Isolde in his 1919 symphonic poem Tintagel

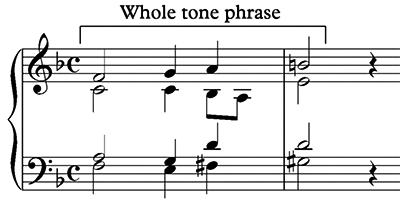
Beginning of Bach's quoted chorale setting

- Alban Berg quoted Johann Sebastian Bach's setting of the chorale "Es ist genug" (It is enough), the closing chorale of Bach's cantata O Ewigkeit, du Donnerwort, BWV 60, with variations in the final movement of his Violin Concerto, subtitled "To the memory of an Angel" in memory of Manon Gropius who died at age 17. In the fourth movement of his Lyric Suite for string quartet, Berg quoted a phrase from the third movement of Alexander von Zemlinsky's Lyric Symphony that originally set the words "Du bist mein eigen, mein eigen" (Thou art mine own, mine own).
- The third movement of Luciano Berio's Sinfonia (1968) is full of quotations that drift in an out of the orchestral and vocal textures. Mahler's scherzo from his Symphony No. 2 is central to the structure of the movement and provides the narrative thread, with further quotations ranging from Bach to Beethoven to Ravel, Richard Strauss and Boulez. At the same time there are many literary quotations in the text. Alex Ross described it as "a surreal collage".
- Georges Bizet used a song "El Arreglito" by Sebastián Iradier as the basis for the "Habanera" (L'amour est un oiseau rebelle) in his opera Carmen, believing it to be an anonymous folk song. When he discovered its true author, who had died only ten years earlier, he made an acknowledgment in the vocal score.
- Johannes Brahms quotes Gaudeamus igitur and other popular university songs in his Academic Festival Overture.
- Benjamin Britten quoted many other works (e.g., Wagner's "Tristan chord") in his opera Albert Herring
- Frédéric Chopin quoted the tenor aria "Vieni fra queste braccia" from Rossini's opera La gazza ladra in his Polonaise in B-flat minor, "Adieu a Guillaume Kolberg", Op. posth; Chopin and Kolberg had seen the opera together
- Brett Dean's work for violin and orchestra, The Lost Art of Letter Writing (2006), includes two quotations from Johannes Brahms: the slow movement of the Fourth Symphony and the Variations on a Theme of Robert Schumann.
- Claude Debussy quoted the opening of Tristan und Isolde disparagingly in the Golliwogg's Cakewalk from his Children's Corner suite for piano
- Sir Edward Elgar quoted The First Nowell and some of his own earlier music in The Starlight Express
- Manuel de Falla quoted the opening of Beethoven's 5th Symphony in his ballet The Three-Cornered Hat.
- Alberto Franchetti quoted widely from German popular songs and from the work of several German composers in his opera Germania, in order to lend the score a German color
- Umberto Giordano quoted the French national anthem La Marseillaise in his opera Andrea Chénier
- Charles Ives was particularly fond of quoting other composers' themes in his works. They can be found in works such as Three Places in New England and his Piano Sonata No. 2
- Wolfgang Amadeus Mozart quoted a theme by his recently deceased mentor Johann Christian Bach in his Piano Concerto No. 12
- Giacomo Puccini quoted the U.S. national anthem The Star-Spangled Banner in his opera Madama Butterfly
- Sergei Rachmaninoff based his song "Fate" on the first two measures of the opening movement of Beethoven's Fifth Symphony
- Franz Schubert used self-quotation to convey an associative meaning, as with his song 'Ave Maria' within the Piano Trio No. 2.
- Robert Schumann quoted La Marseillaise in his song The Two Grenadiers and his Carnival Jest from Vienna; he also quoted two themes from his Papillons, Op. 2 in his later work Carnaval, Op. 9 (one of which was the traditional Grossvater Tanz); further, he quoted Beethoven's An die ferne Geliebte and (more distantly) Seventh Symphony in his Fantasie in C, Op. 17
- Dmitri Shostakovich – quotes from Richard Wagner's opera's Tristan und Isolde and Götterdämmerung, Gioachino Rossini's William Tell Overture, Sergei Rachmaninoff's Symphonic Dances, his own Seventh Symphony and various other sources in his Fifteenth Symphony
- Richard Strauss quoted the funeral march from Beethoven's Eroica symphony (No. 3) in his Metamorphosen for 23 solo strings
- Strauss used many quotes from his own works in his symphonic poem A Hero's Life
- Strauss quoted Luigi Denza's song Funiculì, Funiculà in his symphonic poem Aus Italien, believing it was a folk song
- Igor Stravinsky quoted a theme from Franz Schubert's Marche Militaire No. 1 in D in his Circus Polka.
- Sir Arthur Sullivan did quote actual melodies by Franz Schubert and Johann Sebastian Bach, but he was more adept at deliberately imitating the styles of other composers without actually quoting their works. The styles of Bellini, Bizet, Donizetti, Dvořák, Gounod, Handel, Liszt, Mendelssohn, Rossini, Verdi, Wagner and others can all be found in his works.
- Pyotr Ilyich Tchaikovsky quoted the Russian national anthem (God Save the Tsar!), La Marseillaise, a Russian Orthodox plainchant (God Preserve Thy People), and some Russian folk songs, in his 1812 Overture. He used folk material in other compositions, such as the 4th Symphony and the 1st Piano Concerto. He quoted the traditional Grossvater Tanz in Act I of The Nutcracker. And in Act 2, Scene 2 of The Queen of Spades, he has the Countess sing Laurette's aria "Je crains de lui parler la nuit" from André Grétry's opera Richard Coeur-de-Lion.
- Ernest Tomlinson's orchestral Fantasia on Auld Lang Syne (1976) is a quodlibet which introduces at least 129 well-known tunes from classical and folk sources, often overlapping, as counter melodies to Auld Lang Syne, which is present throughout the 20 minute piece.
- Ralph Vaughan Williams quoted the theme from the Epilogue of the third movement of Arnold Bax's Symphony No. 3 in his Concerto for Two Pianos and Orchestra.
- Giuseppe Verdi quoted the national anthems of France, Italy and the United Kingdom in his 1862 cantata Inno delle nazioni.
- Heitor Villa-Lobos quoted Yara, a schottische composed in 1896 by Anacleto de Medeiros, in his Chôros No. 10 (1926), as well as the text added in 1907 by Catullo da Paixão Cearense, from which Villa-Lobos took the subtitle of his work, "Rasga o coração" (It Rends Your heart").

Quotation is also a tradition in jazz performance, especially of the bebop era. Charlie Parker, for instance, quoted Stravinsky's Rite of Spring in his solo on "Repetition", and "Country Gardens" on his Verve recording of "Lover Man"; Dizzy Gillespie quotes David Raksin's "Laura" on "Hot House" during the Massey Hall concert. Dexter Gordon and Sonny Rollins are especially famed among jazz fans for their addiction to quotation. Often the use of musical quotation has an ironic edge, whether the musician is aiming for an amusing juxtaposition or is making a more pointed commentary (as when a youthful Rollins, playing alongside Charlie Parker on Miles Davis's Collector's Items, throws in a snippet of "Anything You Can Do I Can Do Better," or when the avant-garde saxophonist Ornette Coleman rebuffs a skeptical heckler at the Croydon Hall concert with a snippet of the jazz standard "Cherokee").

Although less common, musical quotations can be found in rock music, for example Barenaked Ladies "Hello City" quotes a stanza from The Housemartins' "Happy Hour". Sampling, a foundation of hip hop music, is the reuse of a portion (or sample) of a sound recording in another recording.

== See also ==
- Contrafact
- Quodlibet
- Variation (music)
- List of variations on a theme by another composer
- Sampling (music)
- Composer tributes (classical music)
- Interpolation (popular music)

== Sources ==
- Nicolas Slonimsky, Richard Kassel eds., Webster's New World Dictionary of Music
