= Siehr =

Siehr is a surname. Notable people with the name include:

- Ernst Siehr (1869–1945), German lawyer and politician
- Gustav Siehr (1837–1896), German Hofoper- and Kammersänger bass
