= The Fringes of the Fleet =

1915 booklet by Rudyard Kipling

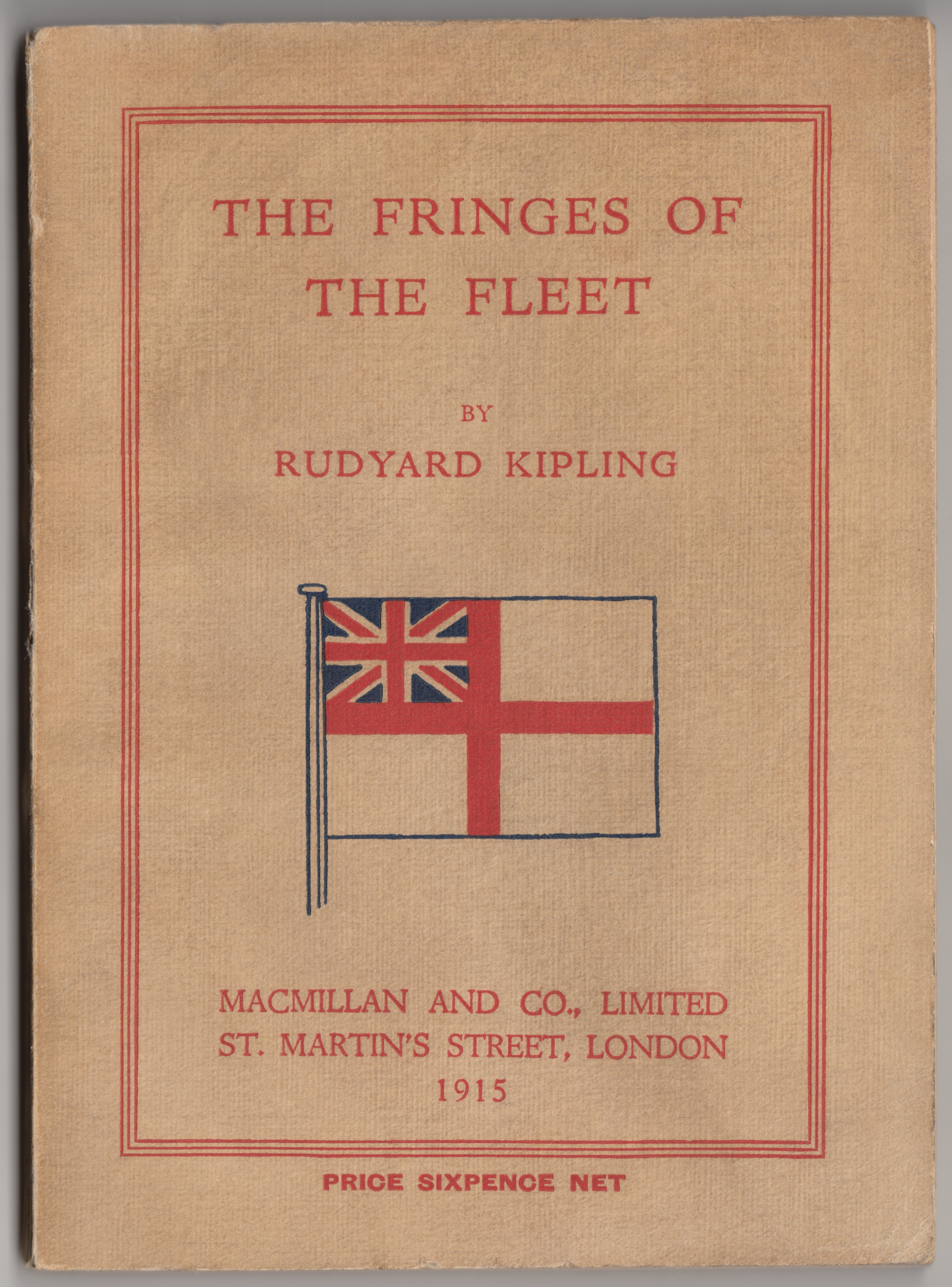
First booklet publication (Macmillan & Co.)

The Fringes of the Fleet is a booklet written in 1915 by Rudyard Kipling (1865–1936). The booklet contains essays and poems about nautical subjects in World War I.

It is also the title of a song-cycle written in 1917 with music by the English composer Edward Elgar and lyrics from poems in Kipling's booklet.

== Kipling's booklet ==
In 1915 Kipling was commissioned by The Daily Telegraph to write a series of six articles on his view of life in less well-known aspects of the defence of the nation on its seas. These were given the general title "The Fringes of the Fleet", and had three sub-titles "The Auxiliaries", "Submarines" and "Patrols", and published between 20 November and 2 December. Each was prefaced by a short poem which did not have a title itself.

Immediately afterwards the poems and essays were re-published in a booklet called "The Fringes of the Fleet".

1. The Auxiliaries – I

The text opens with a poem The Lowestoft Boat which starts with the words "In Lowestoft a boat was laid, / Mark well what I do say!", later given the title "The Lowestoft Boat" and a subtitle "(East Coast Patrols of the War)".

2. The Auxiliaries – II

The text opens with a poem which starts "Dawn off the Foreland – the young flood making / Jumbled and short and steep – ", later titled "Mine Sweepers".

3. Submarines – I

The text opens with a poem which resembles the shanty "Farewell and adieu to you, Spanish Ladies". The original and final title, "Harwich Ladies", was for security reasons at the time changed to "Greenwich Ladies".

4. Submarines – II

The text opens with a very short poem (two verses of four lines) titled "Tin Fish". The poem starts "The ships destroy us above / And ensnare us beneath."

5. Patrols – I

The text opens with a poem entitled "A Song in Storm", which starts with the words "Be well assured that on our side / Our challenged oceans fight."

6. Patrols – II

The final article begins with a poem later called "The North Sea Patrol".

== Elgar's songs ==
In January 1916 Lord Charles Beresford requested Elgar to make songs of some of the verses in Kipling's booklet: Elgar chose four of them, and appropriately set them for four men's voices.

Elgar gave different titles to three of the four poems

- "The Lowestoft Boat" used the words of the poem of the same name
- "Fate's Discourtesy" – the poem "A Song in Storm". The words Fate's discourtesy appear in the refrain to all three verses. Edward German set the same poem to music for voice and piano in 1916, giving it the title of the first phrase "Be well assured".
- "Submarines" – the poem "Tin Fish".
- "The Sweepers" – the poem "Mine Sweepers".

The work was dedicated by the composer "...to my friend Admiral Lord Beresford". The first performance was, at Elgar's suggestion, part of a wartime variety show at the London Coliseum on 11 June 1917, and the singers were baritones Charles Mott (following his performance in The Starlight Express), Harry Barratt, Frederick Henry and Frederick Stewart. The show ran for four weeks with two performances a day and was a great success. In the production the curtain rose on a seaport scene, outside a public house, with the four singers in rough-and-ready merchant-seamen's clothes, seated around a table.

"Inside the Bar", with words by Sir Gilbert Parker, was subsequently added to the cycle and performed by the same singers at the same theatre exactly two weeks later. The songs were so popular that later that year Elgar conducted the songs around British provincial music-halls (Stoke, Manchester, Leicester, and Chiswick), with Charles Mott (who had been called up) replaced by George Parker.

For reasons which Elgar did not understand at the time, when they returned to the Coliseum at the end of that year, Kipling appeared and objected to his songs being performed at music-halls. Kipling was upset by the report that his son John was missing.

Elgar's singer, Charles Mott, was later killed in France in May 1918.

== Recordings ==
- The first recording was made on 4 July 1917, with singers Charles Mott, Frederick Henry, Frederick Stewart and Harry Barratt, and Elgar conducting a 'Symphony Orchestra'. This acoustic recording was made for The Gramophone Company and appeared under the His Master's Voice label, on discs D453-4.
- Songs and Piano Music by Edward Elgar "The Fringes of the Fleet" performed by Peter Savidge (baritone) with Mark Bamping, William Houghton and Edward Whiffin (chorus), and David Owen Norris (playing on Elgar's 1844 Broadwood piano)
- Elgar: War Music Paul Kenyon, Stephen Godward, Simon Theobald, Russell Watson (baritones), Barry Collett (conductor), Rutland Sinfonia
- The CD with the book Oh, My Horses! Elgar and the Great War has many historical recordings including the 1917 recording of Fringes of the Fleet with Charles Mott, Frederick Henry, Frederick Stewart, and Harry Barratt (baritones), conducted by Elgar
- Roderick Williams/Guildford Philharmonic Orchestra/Tom Higgins (Somm) SOMMCD243 This recording by the Guildford Philharmonic was billed as the first fully professional orchestral performance in over 90 years.

== Republication in Sea Warfare ==
In 1916 The Fringes of the Fleet was republished by Macmillan, titled Sea Warfare, with two other sections relating to the Navy and a final poem:

- The Fringes of the Fleet (pages 1–92). Opens with a poem "The Lowestoft Boat"; not titled.
- Tales of "The Trade" (1916) (pages 93–143), about the Submarine Service; opens with a poem titled "The Trade" which starts:

They bear, in place of classic names,
Letters and numbers on their skin.
They play their grisly blindfold games
In little boxes made of tin.

- The Battle of Jutland (1916) (pages 145–220), about the sea battle; opens with a poem which starts:

Have you news of my boy Jack?
Not this tide
When d’you think that he’ll come back?
Not with this wind blowing, and this tide.

- A poem titled "The Neutral" ends the book (pages 221–222):

Brethren, how shall it fare with me
When the war is laid aside,
If it be proved that I am he
For whom a world has died?

== See also ==
- "Big Steamers", a 1918 song on a related subject with words by Kipling and music by Elgar
