= The Lowestoft Boat =

1917 poem written by Rudyard Kipling

"The Lowestoft Boat" is a poem written by Rudyard Kipling, and set to music by the English composer Edward Elgar in 1917, as the first of a set of four war-related songs on nautical subjects for which he chose the title "The Fringes of the Fleet".

The song is sub-titled "A Chanty" and, like the others in the cycle, is intended for four baritone voices: a solo and chorus. It was originally written with orchestral accompaniment, but it was later published to be sung with piano accompaniment.

Kipling prefaced the poem with the words "East Coast Patrols of the War, 1914-18". Lowestoft is on the east coast of England, and at the time was a fishing port and base for wartime patrols.

The words "The Lord knows where!" and the last (repeated) "a-rovin', a-rovin', a-roarin' " are sung by the Chorus. There is a direction that the final words "The Lord knows where!" may be spoken by the soloist.
