= Bernard Levin =

British journalist and writer (1928–2004)

Bernard Levin CBE
- Levin c. 1980
- Born: Henry Bernard Levin; 19 August 1928; London, England
- Died: 7 August 2004 (aged 75); London, England
- Resting place: Brompton Cemetery, London
- Education: Christ's Hospital; London School of Economics
- Occupations: Television presenter; journalist; writer
- Partner: Liz Anderson

Henry Bernard Levin CBE (19 August 1928 – 7 August 2004) was an English journalist, author and broadcaster, described by The Times as "the most famous journalist of his day". The son of a poor Jewish family in London, he won a scholarship to the independent school Christ's Hospital and went on to the London School of Economics, graduating in 1952. After a short spell in a lowly job at the BBC selecting press cuttings for use in programmes, he secured a post as a junior member of the editorial staff of a weekly periodical, Truth, in 1953.

Levin reviewed television for the Manchester Guardian and wrote a weekly political column in The Spectator noted for its irreverence and influence on modern parliamentary sketches. During the 1960s he wrote five columns a week for the Daily Mail on any subject that he chose. After a disagreement with the proprietor of the paper over attempted censorship of his column in 1970, Levin moved to The Times where, with one break of just over a year in 1981–82, he remained as resident columnist until his retirement, covering a wide range of topics, both serious and comic.

Levin became a broadcaster, first on the weekly satirical television show That Was the Week That Was in the early 1960s, then as a panellist on a musical quiz, Face the Music, and finally in three series of travel programmes in the 1980s. He began to write books in the 1970s, publishing 17 between 1970 and 1998. From the early 1990s, Levin developed Alzheimer's disease, which eventually forced him to give up his regular column in 1997, and to stop writing altogether not long afterwards.

== Life and career ==
=== Early years ===
Levin was born on 19 August 1928 in London, the second child and only son of Philip Levin, (Note: The Oxford Dictionary of National Biography spells the name "Philip"; Who Was Who, spells it "Phillip".) a tailor of Jewish Bessarabian descent, and his wife, Rose, née Racklin. Philip Levin abandoned the family when Levin was a child, and the two children were brought up with the help of their maternal grandparents, who had emigrated from Lithuania at the turn of the 20th century. Levin wrote of his childhood, "My home was not a religious one; my grandfather read the scriptures to himself silently and struggled through a little English; my grandmother, who could read no language at all, lit a candle on the appropriate days, as did my mother, though for her it was not really a religious sign. My uncles were quite secular ... and had hardly anything to do with the religion of their father and grandfathers". (Note: One of his uncles, Mark, was killed in the Great War.) In The Guardian after Levin's death, Quentin Crewe wrote, "His illiterate grandparents' stories about life in Russia must have instilled in him the passionate belief in the freedom of the individual that lasted his whole life. In return, as he grew older, he used to read to them. Bernard could not read Hebrew, but he could get by in Yiddish".

Rose Levin was a capable cook, and, though the household was not well off, (Note: Levin recalled that it was "sometimes touch and go" whether there would be enough money to buy food.) Levin was well fed and acquired an interest in food that in adult life became one of the regular themes of his journalism. The cuisine was traditional Jewish, with fried fish as one cornerstone of the repertoire, and chicken as another – boiled, roast, or in soup with lokshen (noodles), kreplach or kneidlach. As an adult Levin retained his love of Jewish cookery along with his passion for French haute cuisine.

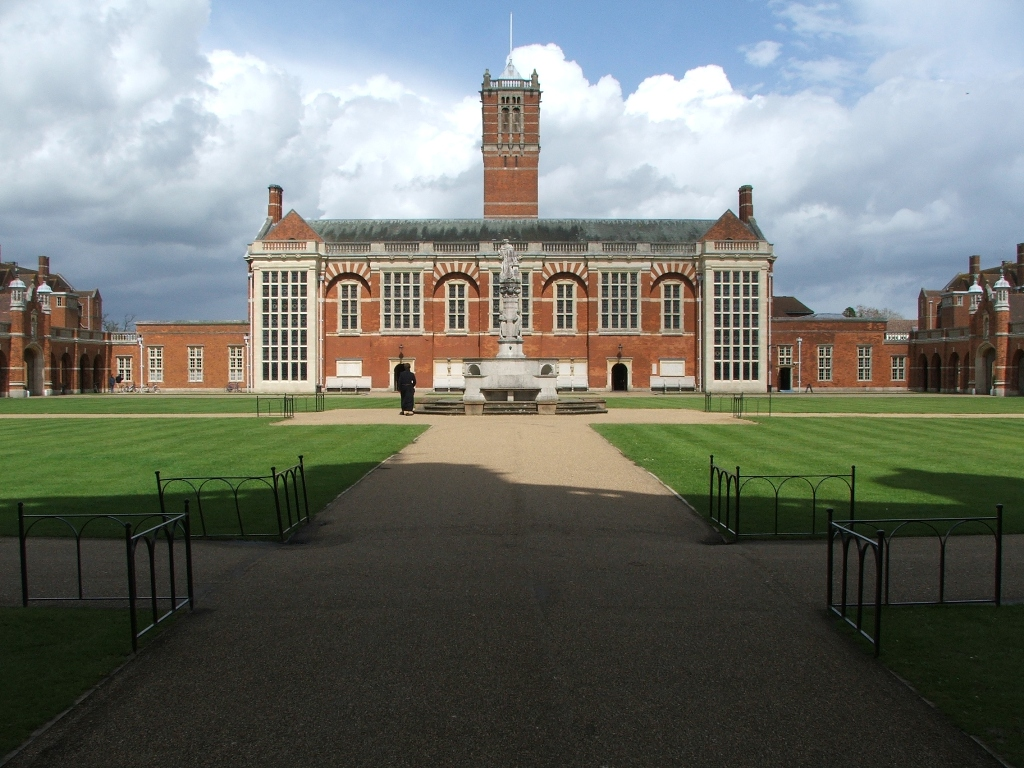
Christ's Hospital school in West Sussex

The Levin household was not especially musical, though it had a piano which Judith was taught to play; Rose Levin bought her son a violin and paid for lessons, convinced that he was "destined to be the next Kreisler or Heifetz". Levin persevered ineptly for two and a half years and then gave up with relief. The experience put him off music for some time, and it was only later that it became one of his passions, a frequent topic in his writing.

Levin was a bright child and, encouraged by his mother, he worked hard enough to win a scholarship to the independent school Christ's Hospital in the countryside near Horsham, West Sussex. His housemaster was D. S. ("Boom") Macnutt, the school's head of Classics. Macnutt was a strict, even bullying, teacher, and was feared rather than loved by his pupils, but Levin learned Classics well, and acquired a lifelong fondness for placing Latin tags and quotations in his writing. He battled on many fronts at Christ's Hospital: he was a Jew at a Church of England establishment; he was from a poor family (although Christ's Hospital is a charity school); he was slight of stature; he was utterly indifferent to sport; he adopted a Marxist stance, hanging the Red Flag from a school window to celebrate the Labour victory in 1945. In the local streets, the school's conspicuous uniform, including a blue coat, knee breeches and yellow socks, attracted unwanted attention. Levin's biographer Bel Mooney writes of this period, "Jeers put iron in his soul". Among the consolations of Christ's Hospital was its thriving musical life. At concerts by the school orchestra (whose members included Levin's contemporary, Colin Davis), Levin listened seriously to music for the first time. The food at the school was no such consolation; according to Levin it was so appalling that there must be something better to be found, and from his late teens he sought out the best restaurants he could afford.

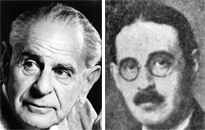
Levin's LSE tutors, Karl Popper (l.) and Harold Laski

Levin hoped to go to the University of Cambridge, but, as his obituarist in The Times wrote, he "was not considered Oxbridge material". He was accepted by the London School of Economics (LSE), where he studied from 1948 to 1952. His talents were recognised and encouraged by LSE tutors including Karl Popper and Harold Laski; Levin's deep affection for both did not prevent his perfecting a comic impersonation of the latter. Levin became a skilled debater; he wrote for the student newspaper The Beaver, on a range of subjects, not least opera, which became one of his lifelong passions.

Having graduated from the LSE in 1952, Levin worked briefly as a tour guide, and then joined the BBC's North American Service. His job was to read all the newspapers and weekly magazines, selecting articles that might be useful for broadcasting.

=== Journalism ===
In 1953, Levin applied for a job on the weekly periodical Truth. The paper had recently been taken over by the liberal publisher Ronald Staples who together with his new editor Vincent Evans was determined to cleanse it of its previous right-wing racist reputation. Levin's noticeably Jewish surname, together with such skills as he had acquired in shorthand and typing, gained him immediate acceptance. He was offered the post of "general editorial dogsbody, which was exactly what I had been looking for". After a year, Evans left and was succeeded by his deputy, George Scott; Levin was promoted in Scott's place. He wrote for the paper under a variety of pseudonyms, including "A. E. Cherryman".

While still at Truth, Levin was invited to write a column in The Manchester Guardian about ITV, Britain's first commercial television channel, launched in 1955. (Note: The Times obituarist notes that Levin's appointment "was for the comically practical reason that [the paper's] regular TV critic lived in Manchester and could not receive the new commercial transmissions from London".) Mooney describes his television reviews as "notably punchy" and The Times commented, "Levin took out his shotgun and let loose with both barrels". Levin gave the opening programmes a kindly review, but by the fourth day of commercial television he was beginning to baulk: "There has been nothing to get our teeth into apart from three different brands of cake-mix and a patent doughnut". Thereafter, he did not spare the network: "cliché succeeded to cliché"; "a mentally defective aborigine who was deaf in both ears would have little difficulty in leaving Double Your Money £32 richer than when he entered"; and after the network's first hundred days he attributed its viewing figures to the "number of people who are sufficiently stupid to derive pleasure from such programmes".

=== The Spectator ===
In 1956, Levin found himself in irreconcilable disagreement with Truth's support of the Anglo-French military action in the Suez Crisis. The proprietor and editor of the long-established weekly The Spectator, Ian Gilmour, invited Levin to join his staff. Levin left Truth and became the political correspondent of The Spectator. He declared that he was no expert in politics, but Gilmour advised him, "review it as you would review television". Levin wrote his column under the pseudonym "Taper", from the name of a corrupt political insider in Disraeli's 1844 novel Coningsby. (Note: Taper is one of a pair of such characters in Coningsby; the other is called Tadpole, a pseudonym never adopted by Levin. Brian Inglis, assistant editor of The Spectator at the time of Levin's appointment, later said that the by-line "Taper" had been chosen for the column in case Levin turned out to be unsatisfactory and had to be replaced.) He followed Gilmour's advice, becoming, as The Guardian's Simon Hoggart said, "the father of the modern parliamentary sketch":

Until then sketch writers were basically on the side of the MPs. Their job was to convey to voters the majesty of our legislators' oratory, to remind us of the surpassing importance of their deliberations. A predecessor of mine published his collected works as The Glory of Parliament. Levin had truck with none of that nonsense. As he said later, he treated the old place as if it were a theatre. 'I was watching a farce, from the front row of the stalls, with a glass of champagne in my hand.' (Note: The obituarist of The Daily Telegraph, however, wrote that "Colin Welch, in The Telegraph, had already set a new style for the Parliamentary sketch, treating the view of the Commons from the Press Gallery as though he were looking on to the stage from the stalls and reviewing a performance which was part high drama and part cabaret".)

Levin made no pretence of even-handedness. There were politicians he liked and politicians he did not like. For those in the latter category, "Taper's lacerations wounded". He invented unflattering nicknames; he wrote later, "I did not (though I wish I had) think of calling Sir Hartley Shawcross Sir Shortly Floorcross, but I did call Sir Reginald Manningham-Buller Sir Reginald Bullying-Manner". When the latter was elevated to the peerage as Lord Dilhorne, Levin renamed him Lord Stillborn.

Taper was not Levin's only work for The Spectator. He wrote on a wide range of subjects, from a campaign for the release of three Arabs imprisoned by the British authorities, to supporting publication of the banned novel Lady Chatterley's Lover, (Note: D. H. Lawrence's 1928 novel, published in other countries but never, until 1960, in Britain, tells of a love affair between the wife of an English landowner and his gamekeeper. Lawrence gives the latter a blunt Anglo-Saxon vocabulary with regard to the sexual act and the relevant body parts for which Penguin Books, as publisher, was prosecuted unsuccessfully for obscenity. The prosecutor, Mervyn Griffith-Jones, famously made himself look foolish by asking the jury if they would want their wives or servants to read the book.) and denunciation of the former Lord Chief Justice, Lord Goddard. The last led to a secret meeting of more than 20 senior judges to see whether Levin could be prosecuted for criminal libel; there was no prosecution, and according to The Times his accusations about Goddard's vindictiveness, deceit and bias were accepted orthodoxy. In 1959, Gilmour, while remaining as proprietor, stepped down as editor and was succeeded by his deputy, Brian Inglis; Levin took over from Inglis as assistant editor. Later in that year, after the general election victory of another of his bêtes noires, Harold Macmillan, Levin gave up the Taper column, professing himself to be in despair.

Concurrently with his work at The Spectator, Levin was the drama critic of The Daily Express from 1959, offending many in theatrical circles by his outspoken verdicts. He modelled his reviewing style on that of Bernard Shaw's musical reviews of the late 19th century. He gave a fellow-critic an edition of Shaw's collected criticism, writing inside the cover, "'In the hope that when you come across the phrases I have already stolen you will keep quiet about it".

Gilmour discouraged any hopes Levin might have had of succeeding Inglis as editor and in 1962, Levin left both The Spectator and The Daily Express, becoming drama critic of The Daily Mail. He remained there for eight years, and for the last five of them also wrote five columns a week on any subject of his choice.

=== Television and The Pendulum Years ===
Although by the early 1960s, Levin was becoming a well-known name, his was not yet a well-known face. Meeting him in London the publisher Rupert Hart-Davis did not immediately recognise him: "He looks about sixteen, and at first I thought he was someone's little boy brought along to see the fun – very Jewish, with wavy fairish hair, very intelligent and agreeable to talk to". Levin was invited to appear regularly on BBC television's new weekly late-night satirical revue, That Was the Week That Was, where he delivered monologues to camera about his pet hates and conducted interviews, appearing as "a tiny figure taking on assorted noisy giants in debate". The programme, which had a short but much-discussed run, was transmitted live; this added to its edginess and impact, but also made it prone to disruption. Levin was twice assaulted on air, once by the husband of an actress whose show Levin had reviewed severely, (Note: The actress was Agnes Bernelle; her husband was Desmond Leslie) and once by a woman astrologer who squirted him with water.

In 1966, BBC television screened a new musical quiz, Face the Music presented by Joseph Cooper. It ran intermittently until 1984. Levin was a frequent panel member along with, among others, Robin Ray, Joyce Grenfell, David Attenborough and Richard Baker.

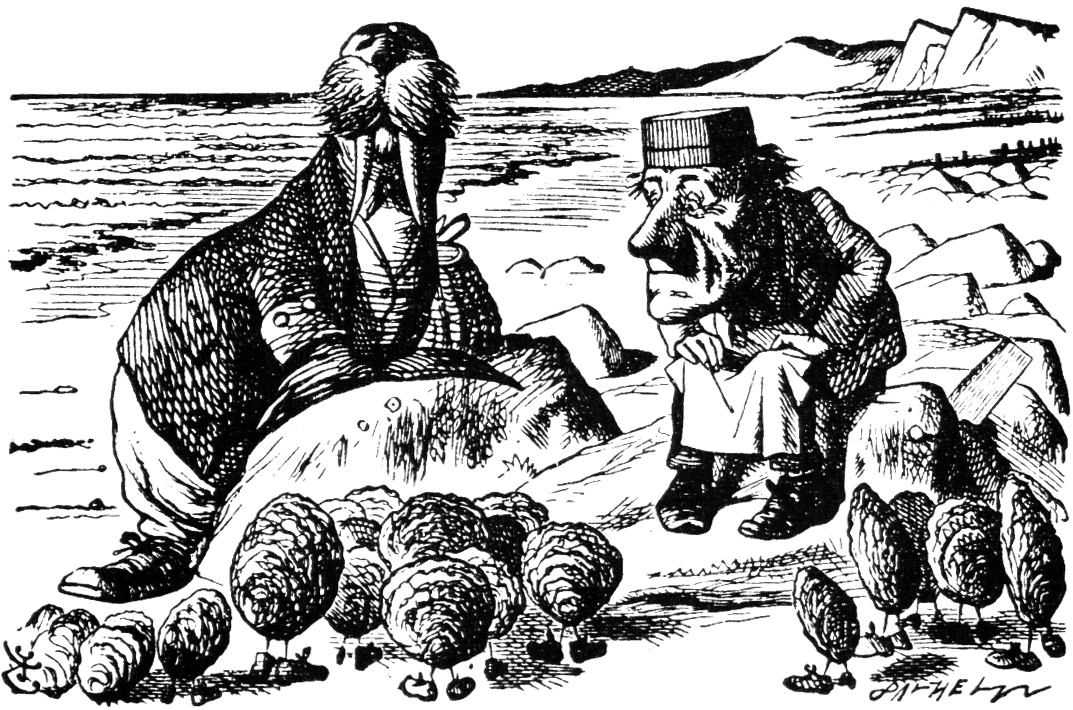
Lewis Carroll's The Walrus and the Carpenter (1871), borrowed by Levin as nicknames for Harold Macmillan and Harold Wilson; illustration by John Tenniel

Levin published his first book in 1970. Called The Pendulum Years, (Note: In the US it was published under the title Run it Down the Flagpole) its subtitle, Britain and the Sixties, summed up its subject. In 22 self-contained chapters, Levin considered various aspects of British life during the decade. Among his topics were prominent people including Harold Macmillan and Harold Wilson – dubbed the Walrus and the Carpenter by Levin – and institutions such as the monarchy, the churches and the British Empire in its last days. Among the individual events examined in the book were the 1968 student riots and the prosecution for obscenity of the publishers of Lady Chatterley's Lover.

Levin's interest in indexes developed from his work on The Pendulum Years. He compiled his own index for the book, "and swore a mighty oath, when I had finished the task, that I would rather die, and in a particularly unpleasant manner, than do it again". He contrived to include in his index an obscene joke at the expense of the hapless prosecutor in the Chatterley trial, (Note: It reads :"'cunt': see Griffith-Jones, Mervyn; 'four-letter words'".) but found the difficulty of indexing so great that he became a champion of the Society of Indexers. He wrote several articles on the subject, and when reviewing books made a point of praising good indexes and condemning bad ones.

=== The Times ===
In June 1970, during the general election campaign, Levin fell out with the proprietors of The Daily Mail, Lord Rothermere and his son Vere Harmsworth. Levin's contract guaranteed him absolute freedom to write whatever he chose, but Harmsworth, an unswerving Conservative, attempted to censor Levin's support for the other major party, Labour. Levin resigned, and immediately received offers from The Guardian and The Times to join them as a columnist. He found both tempting, and at one point "even had a wild notion of suggesting that I should write for both simultaneously". In the end, he chose The Times, giving as his reason that though the liberal Guardian was more in line with his own politics than the conservative Times, "I wrote more comfortably against the grain of the paper I worked for rather than with it". His obituarist in The Times added that the decision may also have been swayed by the better remuneration offered by the paper.

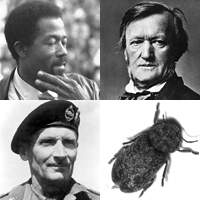
Among Levin's many topics – top Eldridge Cleaver, Wagner; below Field Marshal Montgomery and a Death watch beetle

Among the perquisites of the Times appointment were a company car and a large and splendid office at the paper's building in Printing House Square, London. Levin accepted neither; he could not drive and he hated to be isolated. He commandeered a desk in the anteroom to the editor's office, a location that kept him closely in touch with the daily affairs of the paper. It also gave him ready access to the editor, William Rees Mogg, with whom he developed a good friendship. Levin's brief was to write two columns a week (later three) on any subject that he wished. His range was prodigious; he published nine volumes of his selected journalism of which the first, Taking Sides, covered subjects as diverse as the death watch beetle, Field Marshal Montgomery, Wagner, homophobia, censorship, Eldridge Cleaver, arachnophobia, theatrical nudity, and the North Thames Gas Board.

Within weeks of joining The Times Levin provoked a lawsuit and a strident controversy. The first was in March 1971, in an article titled "Profit and dishonour in Fleet Street", accusing Rothermere of underhand conduct and personal avarice during the merger of The Daily Mail and The Daily Sketch. The libel action brought by Rothermere was settled out of court, at substantial cost to the proprietor of The Times, Lord Thomson. Two months later, controversy followed Levin's renewed condemnation of Lord Goddard immediately after the latter's death in May 1971. The legal profession closed ranks and defended Goddard's reputation against Levin's attacks. Among those denouncing Levin were Lords Denning, Devlin, Hodson, Parker, Shawcross and Stow Hill. After Levin's death The Times published an article opining that information made public since 1971 "strongly supported" his criticisms of Goddard. At the time, the lawyers took revenge on Levin by ensuring that his candidacy for membership of the Garrick, a London club much favoured by lawyers and journalists, was blackballed.

At The Daily Mail, Levin had generally been restricted to 600 words for his articles. At The Times he had more licence to spread himself. He appeared in The Guinness Book of Records for the longest sentence ever to appear in a newspaper – 1,667 words. He was proud of this, and affected to be outraged when "some bugger in India wrote a sentence very considerably longer". He maintained that he could construct impromptu a sentence of up to 40 subordinate clauses "and many a native of these islands, speaking English as to the manner born, has followed me trustingly into the labyrinth only to perish miserably trying to find the way out".

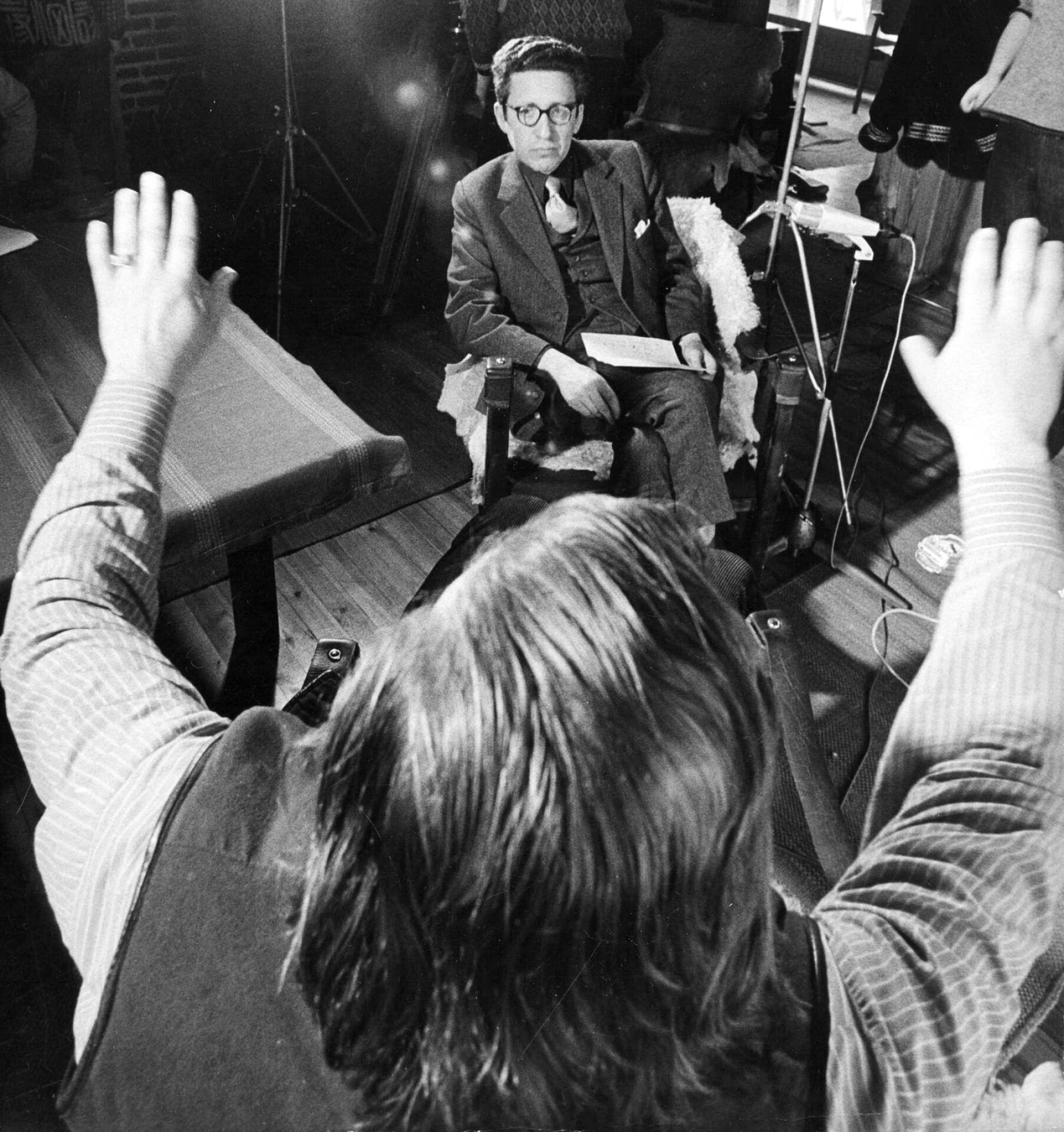
Levin interviewing the Wagnerian bass Martti Talvela for the BBC in 1972

Sometimes Levin wrote about frivolous, even farcical matters, such as a series of mock-indignant articles about the sex-lives of mosquitoes. (Note: An extract from one of these reads, "Full details of the evidence I would blush to give; lest you should think, however, that I am exaggerating, I append a sample of the less disgusting matter: '... the males either attached their claspers to a female's cerci or else clasped her terminal sternum, and in either case only lightly. Often the males made a series of rapid thrusts with their terminalia in the direction of the female's terminalium without actually clasping any structures of the female.' After a good deal more of such filth ('two males were seen attempting to copulate simultaneously with one female in 14 cases ... ') Dr. Bughouse concludes that 'while Aedes aegypti may copulate repeatedly with only one male over a period of days under strictly monogamous conditions, under normal laboratory conditions this species is a polygamous insect'. In other words, mosquitoes don't mind varying the straight and narrow with a bit on the side when they can get it: not, you will agree, an attitude entirely confined to mosquitoes".) At other times he wrote about matters of grave moral importance, unfailingly denouncing authoritarian regimes whether of the left or the right. He observed, "I am barred by the governments concerned from entering the Soviet Union and the lands of her empire on the one hand and South Africa on the other. These decrees constitute a pair of campaign medals that I wear with considerable pleasure and I have a profound suspicion of those who rebuke me for partisanship while wearing only one". He wrote regularly about the arts. Music was a recurrent theme; he was notorious for his addiction to Wagner, (Note: Levin was happy to make fun of his obsession with Wagner; in a 1989 piece not concerned with music but about racism he began, "Will everybody please keep calm; this is not going to be about Wagner, however ominous the evidence. Not long ago, as I was going into the theatre for Scottish Opera's excellent new production of Das Rheingold (keep calm, have I ever lied to you?)...") and other favourite composers included Schubert and Mozart. (Note: One of his most popular articles was about Mozart's operas, playfully categorising admirers of Così fan tutte as pessimistic, those of Don Giovanni as romantic, those of The Magic Flute as spiritual, and those of The Marriage of Figaro as humanitarian.) He wrote about performers he admired, including Otto Klemperer, Alfred Brendel, and Kiri Te Kanawa. He turned less regularly to the visual arts, but when he did his views were clear-cut and trenchantly expressed. He wrote of a Pre-Raphaelite exhibition in 1984, "Never, in all my life, not even at the exclusively Millais exhibition in 1967, have I seen so much sickening rubbish in one place at one time". His knowledge and love of literature were reflected in many of his writings; among his best-known pieces is a long paragraph about the influence of Shakespeare on everyday discourse. It begins:

If you cannot understand my argument, and declare 'It's Greek to me', you are quoting Shakespeare; if you claim to be more sinned against than sinning, you are quoting Shakespeare; if you recall your salad days, you are quoting Shakespeare; if you act more in sorrow than in anger, if your wish is father to the thought, if your lost property has vanished into thin air, you are quoting Shakespeare". (Note: The piece contains a further 55 phrases from Shakespeare familiar in regular conversation, as well as one – "but me no buts" – misattributed to Shakespeare by Levin, but in fact from Susanna Centlivre's The Busie Body (1709), later used in Fielding's Rape upon Rape (1730) and popularised by Scott's The Antiquary (1816).)

=== Arianna Stassinopoulos (Huffington) ===
In 1971, Levin appeared in an edition of Face the Music along with a new panellist, Arianna Stassinopoulos (later known as Arianna Huffington). He was 42; she was 21. A relationship developed, of which she wrote after his death: "He wasn't just the big love of my life, he was a mentor as a writer and a role model as a thinker".

Although Levin had rejected Judaism when a youth, he quested after spirituality. Such religious sympathies as he had, he said, were "with quietist faiths, like Buddhism, on the one hand, and with a straightforward message of salvation, like Christianity, on the other". With the help of Stassinopoulos he continued to search after spiritual truth. She later wrote, "He tried therapy, he tried Insight, a self-awareness seminar that I had helped to bring to London, he tried a stint in an ashram in India. Lesser souls would have avoided the ridicule that was heaped on him for his spiritual 'search' by simply keeping it to himself. But he didn't, because anything he was touched by he had to write about". In 1980 he wrote extensive accounts in his column about his visit to the Indian commune of the meditation teacher Osho.

Levin was commissioned by the BBC to visit musical festivals around the world, broadcasting a series of talks about them. Together with Stassinopoulos, he visited festivals in Britain, Ireland, continental Europe and Australia. He later wrote a book, Conducted Tour (1982) on the same subject. (Note: Reviewing the book in The Musical Times, Arthur Jacobs wrote, "Should anyone enquire why Bernard Levin's festival-hopping gets into book form, and not that of the professional music critics, the answer is (if I may speak as one of those critics) that he writes better. ... Enjoying himself, he conveys that enjoyment with unrivalled flair and enthusiasm".) By the time it was published he and Stassinopoulos were no longer together. At the age of 30, she remained deeply in love with him but longed to have children; Levin never wanted to marry or be a father. She concluded that she must break away, and moved to New York in 1980.

In later years, Liz Anderson (Elisabeth Anderson) was Bernard Levin's partner. Like Arianna Stassinopoulos, she was also Levin's junior by more than 20 years.

=== 1980s ===
In 1981 Levin took a sabbatical from The Times after Rupert Murdoch bought the paper and Harold Evans succeeded Rees-Mogg as editor. Evans and Levin were friends, but Levin had publicly stated his preference that Charles Douglas-Home should be appointed. Within a year Evans and Murdoch fell out and Evans left in 1982; Douglas-Home became editor, and coaxed Levin back, to write two columns a week. On returning to the paper in October 1982, he began his column with the words, "And another thing". This mirrored his opening gambit when publication of The Times resumed in 1979 after a printers' strike lasting nearly a year: his first column then had begun with the word "Moreover".

By the 1980s, Levin was sufficiently well known to be the subject of satire himself. The satirical ITV show Spitting Image caricatured him in high-flown discussion with another well-known intellectual in a sketch entitled "Bernard Levin and Jonathan Miller Talk Bollocks". By now, Levin's political views were moving to the right, and he was no longer writing so much against the grain of his newspaper. He had come to admire Margaret Thatcher, though not the rest of her party: "But there is one, and only one, political position that, through all the years and all my changing views and feelings, has never altered, never come into question, never seemed too simple for a complex world. It is my profound and unwavering contempt for the Conservative Party".

Levin never published an autobiography, but his book Enthusiasms, published in 1983, consists of chapters on his principal pleasures: books, pictures, cities, walking, Shakespeare, music, food and drink, and spiritual mystery. The book is dedicated "To Arianna, with much more than enthusiasm" – they remained loving friends for the rest of his life. It contains a sentence that far outdoes his earlier 1,667 word effort in The Times, starting on page 212 and ending four pages later; it lists the restaurants most esteemed by Levin in Europe, Asia and America. It also briefly mentions Levin's battle against depression, akin to bipolar disorder.

In the 1980s, Levin made three television series for Channel 4. The first, Hannibal's Footsteps, screened in 1985, showed Levin walking the presumed route taken by Hannibal when he invaded Italy in 218 BC. The programme followed Levin's 320-mile journey from Aigues-Mortes to the crossing into Italy in the Queyras valley in the French Alps. He remained true to his declared intention of eschewing all forms of vehicular transport, and walked all the way, with the exception of his crossing the Rhone, rowing himself in a small boat. He followed this with To the End of the Rhine in 1987, following the Rhine from its two sources, the Hinterrhein and the Vorderrhein, in Switzerland, to its estuary at Rotterdam, 1,233 km (766 mi) to the north. In between he joined the Swiss citizen army on manoeuvres, visited Liechtenstein bankers, zig-zagged the Swiss–German border at Lake Constance, attended the Schubertiade at Hohenems and the opera at Bregenz, took the waters at Baden-Baden, visited the manufacturers of eau de Cologne, and paid tribute to Erasmus at Basel.

The last of the three series was in 1989, A Walk up Fifth Avenue in New York, from Washington Square to the Harlem River. In this series he encountered extremes of wealth and poverty, and met a wide variety of people, some famous (such as Jacqueline Kennedy Onassis and Donald Trump) and some not (including a sword-swallowing unicyclist, and a bag lady in Central Park). He wrote books based on each of the three series, published in 1985, 1987 and 1989 respectively.

=== Last years ===
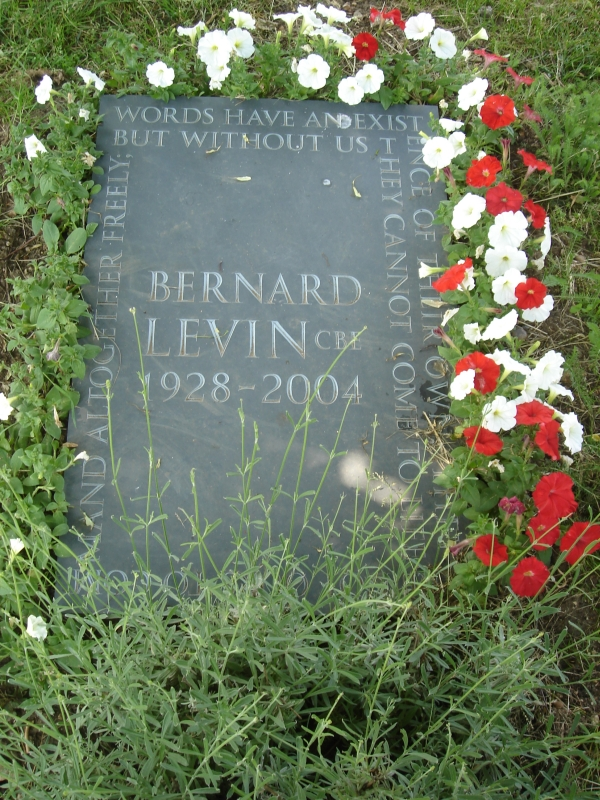
Funerary monument, Brompton Cemetery, London

Levin began to have difficulty with his balance as early as 1988, although Alzheimer's disease was not diagnosed until the early 1990s. From September 1995, his Times column appeared once weekly instead of twice, and in January 1997 the editor, Peter Stothard, concluded, despite a great admiration for Levin, that the weekly column should cease. Levin retired, though he continued to write for the paper occasionally over the next year.

On 7 August 2004, he died in Westminster, London, aged 75. He is buried in Brompton Cemetery, London. A memorial service was held at the church of St Martin-in-the-Fields at which Sir David Frost, delivering the eulogy, described Levin as "a faithful crusader for tolerance and against injustice who had declared, 'The pen is mightier than the sword – and much easier to write with'".

== Honours and commemorations ==
Levin was appointed CBE for services to journalism in 1990. The Society of Indexers has instituted an award in Levin's name; it is given to "a journalist and author whose writings show untiring and eloquent support for indexers and indexing". He was president of the English Association, 1984–85, and vice-president 1985–88. He was an honorary fellow of the LSE from 1977, and a member of the Order of Polonia Restituta, conferred by the Polish government-in-exile in 1976. In its obituary tribute to him, The Times described Levin as "the most famous journalist of his day".

== Bibliography ==
- The Pendulum Years: Britain in the Sixties (Jonathan Cape, 1970) ISBN 0-224-61963-2 (2003 reprint, ISBN 1-84046-418-6)
  - published in the USA as: Run it down the Flagpole: Britain in the Sixties (Atheneum, New York, 1971)
- Taking Sides (Jonathan Cape, 1979) ISBN 0-330-26203-3
- Conducted Tour (Jonathan Cape, 1981) ISBN 0-224-01896-5; 1983, ISBN 0-340-32359-0
- Speaking Up (Jonathan Cape, 1982) ISBN 0-224-01729-2
- Enthusiasms (Jonathan Cape, 1983) ISBN 0-224-02114-1
- The Way We Live Now (Jonathan Cape, 1984) ISBN 0-224-02272-5
- A Shakespeare Mystery (The English Association Presidential Address, 1984) ISBN 0-900232-15-3
- Hannibal's Footsteps (Jonathan Cape, 1985) ISBN 0-224-02273-3 (reprinted 1987 & 1992)
  - reissued as: From the Camargue to the Alps: A Walk Across France in Hannibal's Footsteps (2009) ISBN 1-84024-742-8)
- In These Times (Jonathan Cape, 1986) ISBN 0-340-42434-6
- To the End of the Rhine (Jonathan Cape, 1987) ISBN 0-340-49360-7
- All Things Considered (Jonathan Cape, 1988) ISBN 0-224-02589-9
- A Walk Up Fifth Avenue (Jonathan Cape, 1989) ISBN 0-340-53127-4
- Now Read On (Jonathan Cape, 1990) ISBN 0-340-55983-7
- If You Want My Opinion (Jonathan Cape, 1992) ISBN 0-340-58923-X
- A World Elsewhere (Jonathan Cape, 1994) ISBN 0-340-63264-X
- I Should Say So (Jonathan Cape, 1995) ISBN 0-340-67187-4
- Enough Said (Jonathan Cape, 1998) ISBN 978-0-224-05169-9

== Sources ==
- Hart-Davis, Rupert; George Lyttelton (1987) [1983 and 1984]. The Lyttelton/Hart-Davis Letters, Volumes 5 and 6 (second ed.). London: John Murray. ISBN 0-7195-4381-9.
- Levin, Bernard (1970). The Pendulum Years: Britain in the Sixties. London: Jonathan Cape. ISBN 0-224-61963-2.
- Levin, Bernard (1980) [1979]. Taking Sides (second ed.). London: Pan. ISBN 0-330-26203-3.
- Levin, Bernard (1983) [1982]. Conducted Tour (second ed.). London: Sceptre. ISBN 0-340-40488-4.
- Levin, Bernard (1985) [1983]. Enthusiasms (second ed.). London: Coronet. ISBN 0-340-36927-2.
- Levin, Bernard (1987) [1986]. Hannibal's Footsteps (second ed.). London: Sceptre. ISBN 0-340-40433-7.
- Levin, Bernard (1988) [1986]. In These Times (second ed.). London: Sceptre. ISBN 0-340-42434-6.
- Levin, Bernard (1989) [1987]. To the End of the Rhine (second ed.). London: Sceptre. ISBN 0-340-49360-7.
- Levin, Bernard (1991) [1989]. A Walk Up Fifth Avenue (second ed.). London: Sceptre. ISBN 0-340-53127-4.
