= Submarines (poem) =

Poem written by Rudyard Kipling

Song
- Published: 1917
- Genre: Orchestral song
- Composer: Edward Elgar
- Lyricist: Rudyard Kipling

"Submarines" is a poem written by Rudyard Kipling (1865-1936), and set to music by the English composer Edward Elgar in 1917, as the third of a set of four war-related songs on nautical subjects for which he chose the title "The Fringes of the Fleet".

Like the others in the cycle, is intended for four baritone voices. It was originally written with orchestral accompaniment, but it was later published to be sung with piano accompaniment.

The composer does not make clear which sections of the song, if any, are to be sung solo or in chorus.

The poem was titled by Kipling Tin Fish.

== Poem ==
The ships destroy us above
And ensnare us beneath.
We arise, we lie down, and we move
In the belly of Death.

The ships have a thousand eyes
To mark where we come...
But the mirth of a seaport dies
When our blow gets home.

The musical setting repeats the first stanza.

== The Fringes of the Fleet ==
- Kipling's book Sea Warfare (1916) republished The Fringes of the Fleet (1915) and included a section Tales of "The Trade" about the Submarine Service. It included a poem titled "The Trade" which begins:

They bear, in place of classic names,
Letters and numbers on their skin.
They play their grisly blindfold games
In little boxes made of tin.

— lines 1-4
