= Symphony No. 3 (Bax) =

Symphony by Arnold Bax

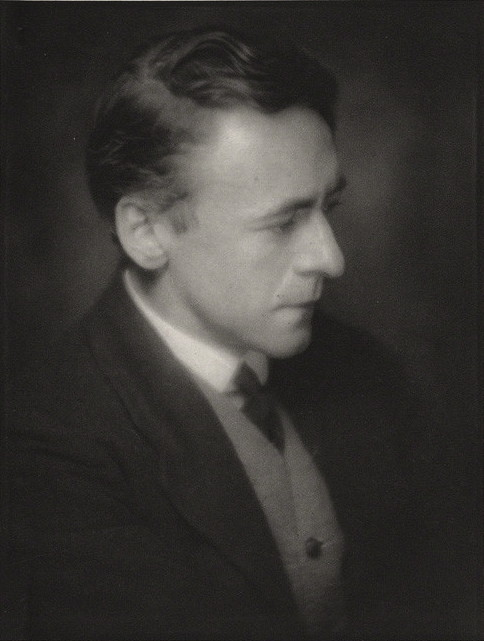
Arnold Bax in 1922

The Symphony No. 3 by Arnold Bax was completed in 1929. It was dedicated to Sir Henry Wood and is perhaps the most performed and most immediately approachable of Bax's symphonies. Unlike his first two symphonies, the third is "gentle rather than somber in character, dominated by the spirit of Northern legends which, Bax acknowledges, influenced him subconsciously".

It was the first symphony Bax completed at the Station Hotel, Morar, in the West Highlands of Scotland. A New York premiere was given by Sir Thomas Beecham in 1936. The first recording was by the Hallé Orchestra under John Barbirolli in 1944.

In addition to the Barbirolli recording, the symphony has been recorded by the London Symphony Orchestra under Sir Edward Downes (RCA), the London Philharmonic Orchestra under Bryden Thomson (Chandos), the BBC Philharmonic with Vernon Handley (Chandos) and the Royal Scottish National Orchestra conducted by David Lloyd-Jones (Naxos). The original Barbirolli recording has been reissued several times by EMI Classics, and latterly by Dutton Vocalion.

== Music ==
It is scored for 3 flutes (1 doubling piccolo), 2 oboes, 4 clarinets, 1 bass clarinet, 2 bassoons, 1 double bassoon, 4 horns, 3 trumpets, 3 trombones, tuba, percussion (timpani, bass drum, tenor drum, snare drum, tambourine, cymbals, gong, xylophone, glockenspiel, celesta, and anvil), 2 harps and strings.

It is in three movements:

1. Lento moderato – Allegro moderato – Lento moderato – Allegro moderato
2. Lento
3. Moderato – Piu mosso – Tempo I – Epilogue

The opening movement begins with a soft bassoon solo which introduces the main melodic theme. The clarinet then joins the bassoon, followed by other instruments of the woodwind section in a relatively short lento moderato opening section. An accelerando then introduces the allegro moderato section which is based upon the opening melody from the bassoon. There is a long slow section in the middle of the movement before the allegro moderato material eventually returns at the conclusion. Unusually, Bax calls for a single anvil strike at the climax of this movement (his original intention had been more conventional, with a cymbal clash).

The dreamy and calm second movement begins with a solo horn introducing the main motive. Throughout the movement there are many other brass solos (particularly trumpet), and the form of the movement is relatively simple. It closes peacefully and beautifully.

The finale opens with a gong and repeated notes from the strings and woodwinds, which is then transformed into the main theme. It ends in an epilogue which closes the first three symphonies—which are in many ways linked, and are a cycle of their own.

For the second movement of his Concerto for Two Pianos and Orchestra, Ralph Vaughan Williams quoted the theme from the Epilogue of the third movement of Bax's symphony.

== Score ==
=== First Movement ===
The symphony opens with an extended solo for bassoon:

Slowly more woodwinds are introduced and as the movement progresses more of the instruments make their appearances. Then a 2nd theme is presented by woodwinds and brass, and recapitulated by the strings:

After some ascending string measures and an accelerando, we are presented with frenetic woodwinds and brass and then an altered version of the original theme. Here is an extended passage with more instruments:
