= Face the Music (British game show) =

British TV panel game show (1967–1984)

- Genre: Panel game show
- Created by: Walter Todds
- Presented by: Joseph Cooper
- Country of origin: United Kingdom
- Original language: English
- No. of series: 12
- No. of episodes: 127

Production
- Running time: 30 minutes

Original release
- Network: BBC2 (1966–79); BBC1 (1983–84)
- Release: 26 December 1966 – 16 December 1984

Face the Music is a British panel game show revolving around classical music which originally aired on BBC2 from 26 December 1966 to 25 December 1979 and then moved to BBC1 from 17 April 1983 to 16 December 1984 with Joseph Cooper hosting the entire run.

The theme music for the show was the Popular Song from the Façade suite by Sir William Walton (who was a guest on the programme in his 70th birthday year). During its most popular period, the programme had a weekly audience of over 4 million.

== Format ==
The programme, chaired by Joseph Cooper, took the form of a quiz about classical music, with a panel of three music-loving celebrities, but without scoring or any winner. Each week there would be a special guest, who would also have to answer questions, with the focus being on topics that related to the guest's life and career, so as to lead to amusing anecdotes. The questions to the panel were asked in a series of rounds, each with a theme, such as "The Face, The Music", in which the panel would have to identify a composer from their picture, as well as the composer of the music played along with it.

The most demanding round was the "Dummy Keyboard", in which Cooper would play a famous piece on a dummy (soundless) instrument, requiring the panel to identify it from hand movements alone. For the benefit of the audience at home, the music in question – which Cooper was hearing through earphones for the purpose of synchronisation – would be slowly faded in as the piece progressed.

Another round was "Hidden Melody", in which Cooper would perform a popular tune in the style of a famous composer, while including extracts of works by that composer to help the listeners. Robin Ray, if a member of that week's panel, would typically identify the opus number of the quoted works.

For opera lovers, the panel were shown a filmed performance of one opera with the soundtrack of a different one, and asked to identify both.

Apart from Ray (the most prolific panellist) other regulars were Bernard Levin, Joyce Grenfell and Richard Baker.

== Transmissions ==
=== Series ===
| Series | Start date | End date | Episodes |
|---|---|---|---|
| Pilot | 26 December 1966 | | 1 |
| 1 | 3 August 1967 | 31 August 1967 | 5 |
| 2 | 16 September 1970 | 21 October 1970 | 6 |
| 3 | 22 March 1971 | 7 June 1971 | 12 |
| 4 | 14 February 1972 | 29 May 1972 | 16 |
| 5 | 14 May 1973 | 27 August 1973 | 16 |
| 6 | 6 May 1974 | 19 August 1974 | 16 |
| 7 | 24 September 1975 | 17 December 1975 | 13 |
| 8 | 24 October 1976 | 19 December 1976 | 8 |
| 9 | 5 August 1979 | 21 October 1979 | 12 |
| 10 | 3 April 1983 | 22 May 1983 | 8 |
| 11 | 28 October 1984 | 16 December 1984 | 8 |

=== Specials ===
| Date | Entitle |
|---|---|
| 26 December 1967 | Christmas Special |
| 24 December 1972 | Christmas Special |
| 25 December 1973 | Christmas Special |
| 25 December 1974 | Christmas Special |
| 20 December 1975 | Christmas Special |
| 26 December 1976 | Christmas Special |
| 2 January 1977 | 100th Episode |
| 25 December 1979 | Christmas Special |
