= Big Steamers =

1911 poem by Rudyard Kipling

"Big Steamers" is a poem by Rudyard Kipling, first published in 1911 as one of his twenty-three poems written specially for C. R. L. Fletcher's "A School History of England". It appears in the last chapter of the book. It is intended for children, with the verses responding with facts and humour to their curiosity about the 'big steamers' - as the merchant ships are called.

== Songs ==
The poem has been set to music by two English composers: Edward German and Edward Elgar. The poem was also put to music by English folk singer and Kipling Society Fellow Peter Bellamy.

German's setting was for baritone voice with piano accompaniment, and published by Cramer in 1911.

Elgar set the poem to music late in World War I, with the permission of Kipling, and it was published in "The Teacher's World", June 19, 1918. This was in response to a request from the Ministry of Food Control to set the poem to music, with the intention that it would be sung in schools and bring to the attention of children the importance of merchant ships - at a time when many ships had been lost to German U-boats and food rationing had just been introduced. It was a simple song with piano accompaniment, suitable for children, and the first music Elgar had written for about a year. Elgar wrote to Lord Rhondda:

"The occasion seemed to call for something exceptionally simple and direct, and I have endeavoured to bring the little piece within the comprehension of very small people indeed."

== Verses ==
There are seven verses. The first six verses begin with the children's questions and suggestions, each of which has a response from the personified Big Steamers:

1. "Oh, where are you going to, all you Big Steamers,

2. "And where will you fetch if from, all you Big Steamers,

3. "But if anything happened to all you Big Steamers,

4. "Then I'll pray for fine weather for all you Big Steamers,

5. "Then I'll build a new lighthouse for all you Big Steamers,

6. "Then what can I do for all you Big Steamers,

At the last line the children are reminded of what was, at the time, a serious possibility:

7. ... And if anyone hinders our coming, you'll starve."

== Recordings ==
- Choir and piano: Big Steamers and other music by Elgar, performed by Barry Collett (piano) and Tudor Choir. On CD - The Unknown Elgar - Pearl SHECD9635
- Roderick Williams, Nicholas Lester, Laurence Meikle and Duncan Rock/Guildford Philharmonic/Tom Higgins: Somm SOMMCD243 Higgins' arrangement of Elgar's song for four unaccompanied baritones, and his arrangement of German's song for baritone solo (Williams) and orchestra
- A version of the Peter Bellamy setting of the poem appears on the 2012 album 'Diversions Volume 3: Songs From The Shipyards' by The Unthanks

== See also ==
- Elgar's settings of four poems from Rudyard Kipling's The Fringes of the Fleet, composed earlier during the war
