= Großvatertanz =

17th-century German traditional dance folk tune

The "Großvatertanz" (Grandfather Dance) is a 17th-century German traditional dance folk tune from the region of Saxony.

== History ==
The song was first mentioned in print in 1717 by the German ballet master Gottfried Taubert (1670–1746), but it was known before.

New lyrics to the first part of the tune were written by Klamer Eberhard Karl Schmidt in 1794 and August Friedrich Ernst Langbein in 1812, both "lengthy and dull pieces of ornate poetry" (Franz Magnus Böhme, 1886). Carl Gottlieb Hering (1766–1853) in 1823 composed a new tune to Langbein's lyrics, for which he has erroneously been claimed to be the real author.

For many years, it was regularly played and danced at the end of wedding celebrations, and became known as the Kehraus ("finale", lit. turn-out).

== Melody and text ==
The original melody has three parts:

1. 8 bars in 3/8 time, slow
2. 4 bars of a different theme in 2/4 time, fast (repeated)
3. 4 bars, a variation of the second theme (repeated).

And when grandfather took grandmother
grandfather was a groom,
and grandmother was a bride,
they were both married together.

With you and me into the featherbed,
with you and me into the hay;
no feather will pierce you there
nor will a flea bite you.

== Quotations ==
J. S. Bach quoted the fast part of the tune in the duet "Nu, Mieke, gib dein Guschel immer her" (Saxon dialect for "Now, Mary, give me your mouth") in the 1742 Bauernkantate (Peasant Cantata), BWV 212, to illustrate the girl's reservations about the man's presumed further intentions ("With you and me into the featherbed").

The tune became so associated with marriage that when Louis Spohr wrote a Festival March for the wedding of Princess Marie of Hesse to the Duke of Saxe-Meiningen in 1825, he was required to quote the "Großvatertanz" in it.

Robert Schumann quoted the "Großvatertanz" in a number of works, among them:

- the final section of Papillons, Op. 2 (1831)
- the final section ("Marche des Davidsbündler contre les Philistins") of Carnaval, Op. 9 (1834–35), where he labels the theme Thème du XVIIème siècle (Theme from the 17th century).

Pyotr Ilyich Tchaikovsky also quotes the tune in act 1 of his ballet The Nutcracker (1892). It appears at the end of the Christmas party. Tchaikovsky was a great admirer of Schumann's music, but it is not clear whether this was meant as some sort of tribute to Schumann or simply as an appropriate tune to use in music depicting the winding up of a happy family event.

More recently, the German composer Jörg Widmann has used the "Großvatertanz" in his Third String Quartet, "Jagdquartett" (2003), to evoke a hunt.
