= Carnaval (Schumann) =

Work for piano composed by Robert Schumann

- Scènes mignonnes sur quatre notes
- Cycle of piano pieces by Robert Schumann
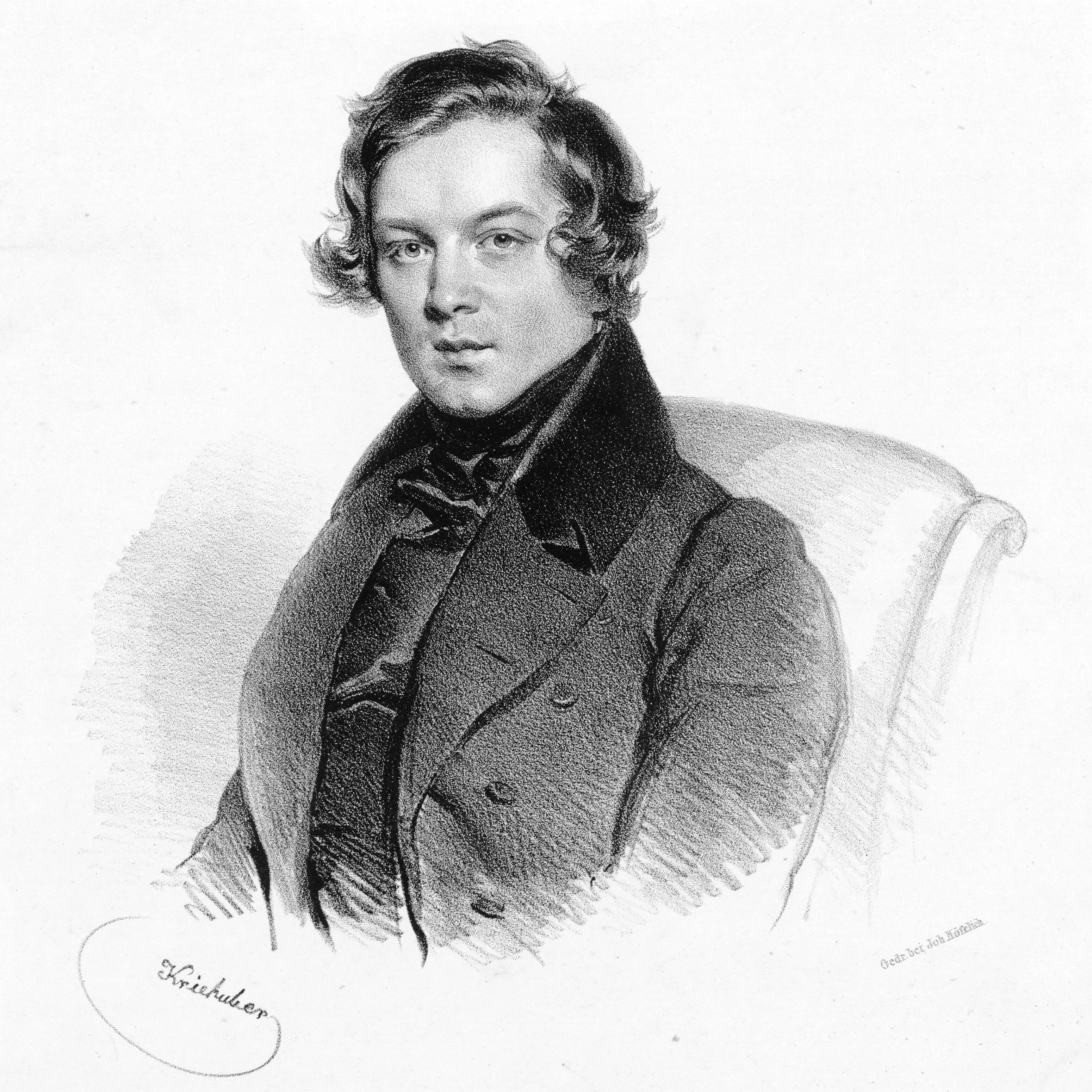
- Robert Schumann, lithograph by Josef Kriehuber (1839)
- Opus: 9
- Based on: Masked revelers at Carnival
- Composed: 1834–35
- Dedication: Karol Lipiński
- Movements: 21 short pieces
- Scoring: Solo piano

Carnaval (complete)
Performed by Sergei Rachmaninoff

Carnaval, Op. 9, is a work by Robert Schumann for piano solo, written in 1834–1835 and subtitled Scènes mignonnes sur quatre notes (Little Scenes on Four Notes). It consists of 21 short pieces representing masked revelers at Carnival, a festival before Lent. Schumann gives musical expression to himself, his friends and colleagues, and characters from improvised Italian comedy (commedia dell'arte). He dedicated the work to the violinist Karol Lipiński.

The work depicts Pierrot and Arlequin, two Zanni characters from commedia dell'arte. They were typically depicted as astute servants and tricksters. The Zanni came from the countryside and represented the typical "dispossessed immigrant worker". (Note: "Immigrant" in Italy at the time of the city-states did not mean someone from outside of Italy but rather someone from outside the city, an itinerant worker.)

== Background ==
Carnaval had its origin in a set of variations on a Sehnsuchtswalzer by Franz Schubert, whose music Schumann had discovered only in 1827. The catalyst for writing the variations may have been a work for piano and orchestra by Schumann's close friend Ludwig Schuncke, a set of variations on the same Schubert theme. Schumann felt that Schuncke's heroic treatment was an inappropriate reflection of the tender nature of the Schubert piece, so he set out to approach his variations in a more intimate way, working on them in 1833 and 1834.

Schumann's work was never completed, however, and Schuncke died in December 1834, but he did re-use the opening 24 measures for the opening of Carnaval. Pianist Andreas Boyde has since reconstructed the original set of variations from Schumann's manuscript (published by Hofmeister Musikverlag), premiered this reconstruction in New York and recorded it for Athene Records. Romanian pianist Herbert Schuch has also recorded this reconstruction, with his own editorial emendations, for the Oehms Classics label.

The 21 pieces are connected by a recurring motif. The four notes are encoded puzzles, and Schumann predicted that "deciphering my masked ball will be a real game for you." In each section of Carnaval there appears one or both of two series of musical notes. These are musical cryptograms, as follows:

- A, E♭, C, B – German: A–Es–C–H (the Es is pronounced as a word for the letter S)
- A♭, C, B – German: As–C–H
- E♭, C, B, A – German: as Es–C–H–A

The first two spell the German name for the town of Asch (now Aš in the Czech Republic), in which Schumann's then fiancée, Ernestine von Fricken, was born. The sequence of letters also appears in the German word Fasching, meaning carnival. In addition, Asch is German for "Ash", as in Ash Wednesday, the first day of Lent. Lastly, it encodes a version of the composer's name, Robert Alexander Schumann. The third series, S–C–H–A, encodes the composer's name again with the musical letters appearing in Schumann, in their correct order.

Heinz Dill has mentioned Schumann's use of musical quotes and codes in this work. Eric Sams has discussed literary allusions in the work, such as to novels of Jean Paul.

In Carnaval, Schumann goes further musically than in Papillons, Op. 2, for he himself conceives the story for which it serves as a musical illustration. Each piece has a title, and the work as a whole is a musical representation of an elaborate and imaginative masked ball during carnival season. Carnaval remains famous for its resplendent chordal passages and its use of rhythmic displacement and has long been a staple of the pianist's repertoire.

Both Schumann and his wife Clara considered his solo piano works too difficult for the general public. (Frédéric Chopin is reported to have said that Carnaval was not music at all. Chopin did not warm to Schumann on the two occasions they met briefly and had a generally low opinion of his music.) Consequently, the works for solo piano were rarely performed in public during Schumann's lifetime, although Franz Liszt performed selections from Carnaval in Leipzig in March 1840, omitting certain movements with Schumann's consent. Six months after Schumann's death, Liszt would write to Wilhelm Joseph von Wasielewski, Schumann's future biographer, that Carnaval was a work "that will assume its natural place in the public eye alongside Beethoven's Diabelli Variations, which in my opinion it even surpasses in melodic invention and conciseness".

== Sections ==
The work has 21 sections, plus a separate line in between the 8th and 9th sections, titled Sphinxs, that contains a description of the aforementioned musical codes. Sections 16 and 17 are actually a single piece with the middle section having its own title; they are commonly numbered separately.

1. Préambule (A♭ major; Quasi maestoso)

The Préambule is one of the few pieces in the set not explicitly organized around the A–S–C–H idea. It was taken from the incomplete Variations on a Theme of Schubert. The theme was Schubert's Sehnsuchtswalzer, Op. 9/2, D. 365.

2. Pierrot (E♭ major; Moderato)

This is a depiction of Pierrot, a character from the commedia dell'arte, commonly represented in costume at a ball.

3. Arlequin (B♭ major; Vivo)

This is a depiction of Harlequin, another character from the commedia dell'arte.

4. Valse noble (B♭ major; Un poco maestoso)

5. Eusebius (E♭ major; Adagio)

Depicting the composer's calm, deliberate side.

6. Florestan (G minor; Passionato)

Depicting the composer's fiery, impetuous side. Schumann quotes the main waltz theme from his earlier work Papillons, Op. 2, in this movement.

7. Coquette (B♭ major; Vivo)

Depicting a flirtatious girl.

8. Replique (B♭ major – G minor; L'istesso tempo)

A 'reply' to the coquette.

—. Sphinxs

This consists of three sections, each consisting of one bar on a single staff in bass (F) clef, with no key, tempo, or dynamic indications. The notes are written as breves or double whole notes. The pitches given are the notes E♭C B A (SCHA) and A♭C B (AsCH) and A E♭C B (ASCH). Many pianists and editors, including Clara Schumann, advocate for omitting the Sphinxs in performance.

9. Papillons (B♭ major; Prestissimo)

This piece is unrelated to his earlier work of the same name.

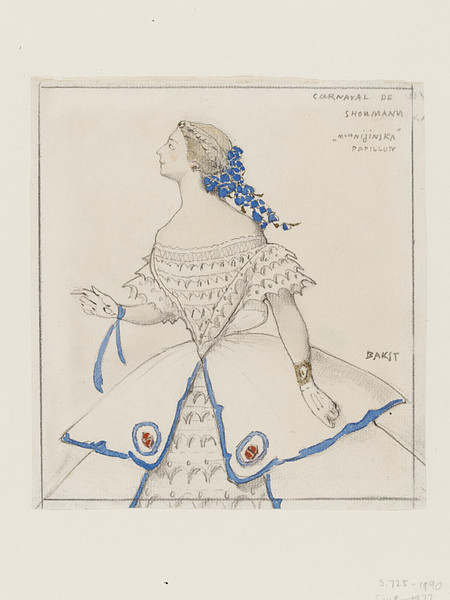
Costume design by Bakst

10. A.S.C.H. S.C.H.A. (Lettres Dansantes) (E♭ major; Presto)

Despite the title, the pattern used is As–C–H.

11. Chiarina (C minor; Passionato)

A depiction of Clara Schumann.

12. Chopin (A♭ major; Agitato)

An evocation of his colleague Frédéric Chopin.

13. Estrella (F minor; Con affetto)

Depicting Ernestine von Fricken.

14. Reconnaissance (A♭ major; Animato)

Likely depicting Schumann and Ernestine recognizing each other at the ball.

15. Pantalon et Colombine (F minor (ends in F major); Presto)

The characters Pantalone and Columbina from the commedia dell'arte.

16–17. Valse allemande – Paganini (A♭ major – F minor – A♭ major; Molto vivace – Intermezzo: Presto)

A German waltz, with an evocation of Niccolò Paganini in the middle. 16 and 17 are actually a single piece in ABA form: #16 consisting of the initial A-part (Molto vivace) entitled "Valse Allemande", followed by #17 the B-part (Intermezzo: Presto) entitled "Paganini" and a reprise of the entire Valse A-part again (Tempo I: ma più vivo).

18. Aveu (F minor – A♭ major; Passionato)

Depicting a confession of love.

19. Promenade (D♭ major; Con moto)

20. Pause (A♭ major; Vivo)

A short introduction and a quote of the first section Préambule, leads into the final section.

21. Marche des "Davidsbündler" contre les Philistins (A♭ major; Non allegro)

Quotations from a number of the previous sections fleetingly reappear; the Großvatertanz, identified by Schumann in the score as a "Theme from the 17th century" and intended to represent those holding to old-fashioned, outdated and inartistic ideals (i.e., Philistines) is quoted from his earlier work Papillons, Op. 2. Near the end of the piece, there is also a quotation of a theme from the last movement of Beethoven's Emperor Concerto. The comparison of two themes is shown below:

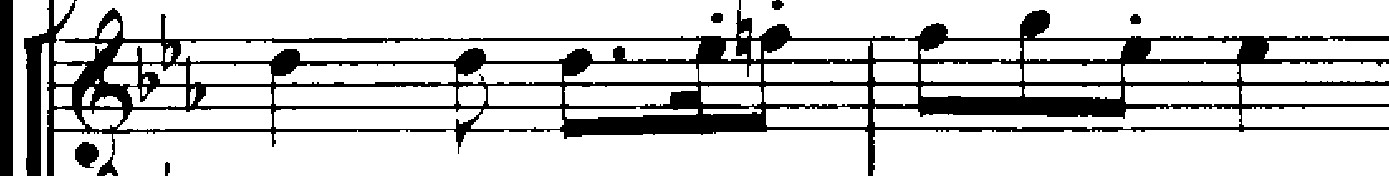
Motif from the last movement of Beethoven's Emperor Concerto.

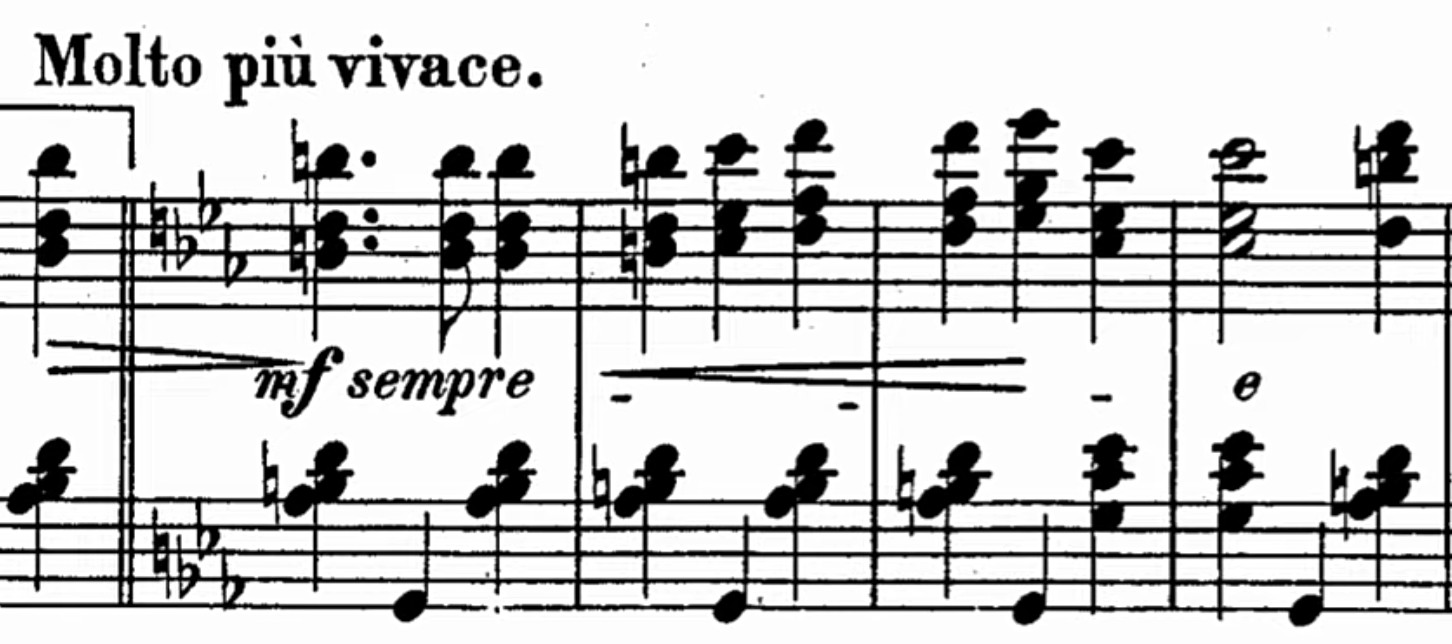
A motif from the last section of Carnaval.

== Orchestrations ==
In 1910, Michel Fokine choreographed Carnaval for a production by Sergei Diaghilev's Ballets Russes, with orchestration written collaboratively by Alexander Glazunov, Nikolai Rimsky-Korsakov, Anatoly Lyadov and Alexander Tcherepnin.

Among others who have orchestrated Carnaval are Maurice Ravel (1914) and Giampaolo Testoni (1995).
