= A Song in Storm =

Poem written by Rudyard Kipling

"A Song in Storm" is a poem written by Rudyard Kipling (1865-1936).

It has been set to music by two English composers Edward German and Edward Elgar.

German set the poem for voice and piano in 1916, with the title "Be well assured", which is the first phrase of the poem.

Elgar set the poem in 1917, with the title "Fate's Discourtesy", as the second of a set of four war-related verses by Kipling on nautical subjects for which he chose the title "The Fringes of the Fleet". The phrase "Fate's discourtesy" leads in the refrain to all three verses of the poem. Like the other songs in the cycle, is intended for four baritone voices: a solo and chorus. It was originally written with orchestral accompaniment, but it was later published to be sung with piano accompaniment.

T. S. Eliot included the poem in his 1941 collection A Choice of Kipling's Verse.
