= Papillons =

Piano cycle by Robert Schumann

- Suite by Robert Schumann
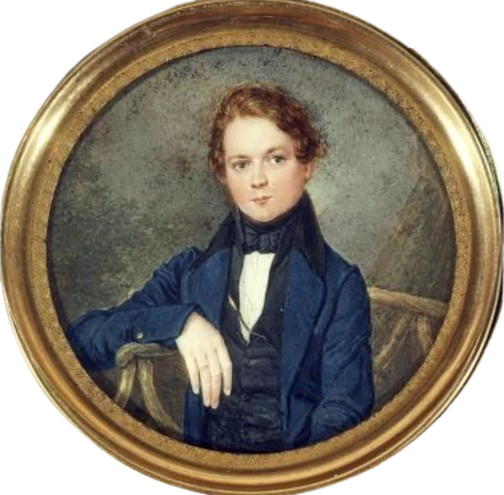
- Schumann at age sixteen, before composing this work
- English: Butterflies
- Opus: 2
- Composed: 1831
- Duration: 15 minutes
- Movements: 12
- Scoring: Solo piano

Papillons (French for "butterflies"), Op. 2, is a suite of piano pieces written in 1831 by Robert Schumann when he was 21 years old. The work is meant to represent a masked ball and was inspired by Jean Paul's novel Flegeljahre (The Awkward Age). A 12-year-old Clara Wieck premiered the piece.

The suite begins with a six-measure introduction before launching into a variety of dance-like movements. Each movement is unrelated to the preceding ones, except that the second, A major, theme of the sixth movement recurs in G major in the tenth movement, and the theme of the first movement returns in the finale. Eric Jensen notes that the 11th movement is appropriately a polonaise because the novel's character Wina is Polish. The last movement starts out by quoting the theme of the traditional "Großvatertanz" (Grandfather's Dance), which was always played at the end of a wedding or similar celebration. Repeated notes near the end of the piece suggest a clock striking, signifying the end of the ball.

The autograph manuscript of the work is preserved in the Bibliothèque nationale de France.

A typical performance lasts fifteen minutes.

== Structure ==
The composition's twelve movements are:

Introduction. Moderato (D major)

1. Waltz (D major)
2. Waltz – Prestissimo (E♭ major)
3. Waltz – Pomposo (F♯ minor)
4. Waltz – Allegretto vivace (A major)
5. Polonaise – Allegretto cantabile (B♭ major)
6. Waltz – Allegro molto (D minor)
7. Waltz – Semplice (F minor)
8. Waltz – Allegro con brio (C♯ minor)
9. Waltz – Prestissimo (B♭ minor)
10. Waltz – Vivo (C major)
11. Polonaise – Allegro con spirito (D major)
12. Finale (D major)

== Related works ==
Schumann quoted some themes from Papillons in his later work, Carnaval, Op. 9, but none of them appear in section no. 9 of that work titled "Papillons". The main waltz theme from the first movement in Papillons was quoted in the section "Florestan", with an explicit acknowledgement written in the score, and again in the final section, "Marche des Davidsbündler contre les Philistins", but without acknowledgement. The "Großvatertanz" also appears in the final section, with the inscription "Thème du XVIIème siècle".

Jörg Widmann quotes the first eight bars of the finale at the beginning of his third string quartet 'The Hunt':

"Großvatertanz" (Grandfather's Dance)

== Ballet ==
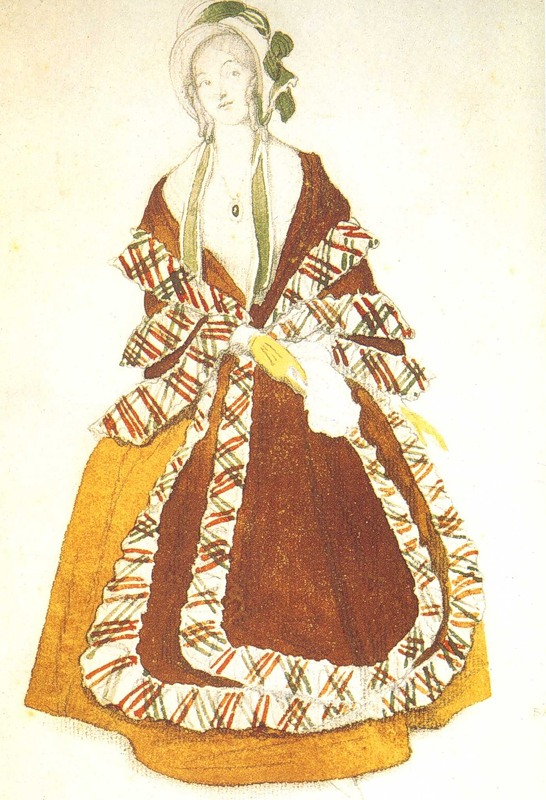
Costume design by Bakst

Schumann's score (arranged Tcherepnin) was used for a ballet by Fokine. It had costumes by Léon Bakst.
