= Josiah Booth =

English organist and composer

Josiah Booth (27 March 1852 – 29 December 1929) was an English organist and composer, known chiefly for his hymn-tunes.

Booth was born in Coventry, where he was taught music by Edward Simms, and subsequently studied at the Royal Academy of Music, under Henry Brinley Richards and George Alexander Macfarren. In 1868 he became organist at Banbury's Wesleyan Chapel. Several of his tunes were included in the 1887 Congregational Church Hymnal. One of his works was performed at the National Fete of the Independent Order of Grand Templars at Crystal Palace in 1884.

Booth's own pupils included G. D. Cunningham and Charles James Mott.
