= Gustav Siehr =

German operatic bass

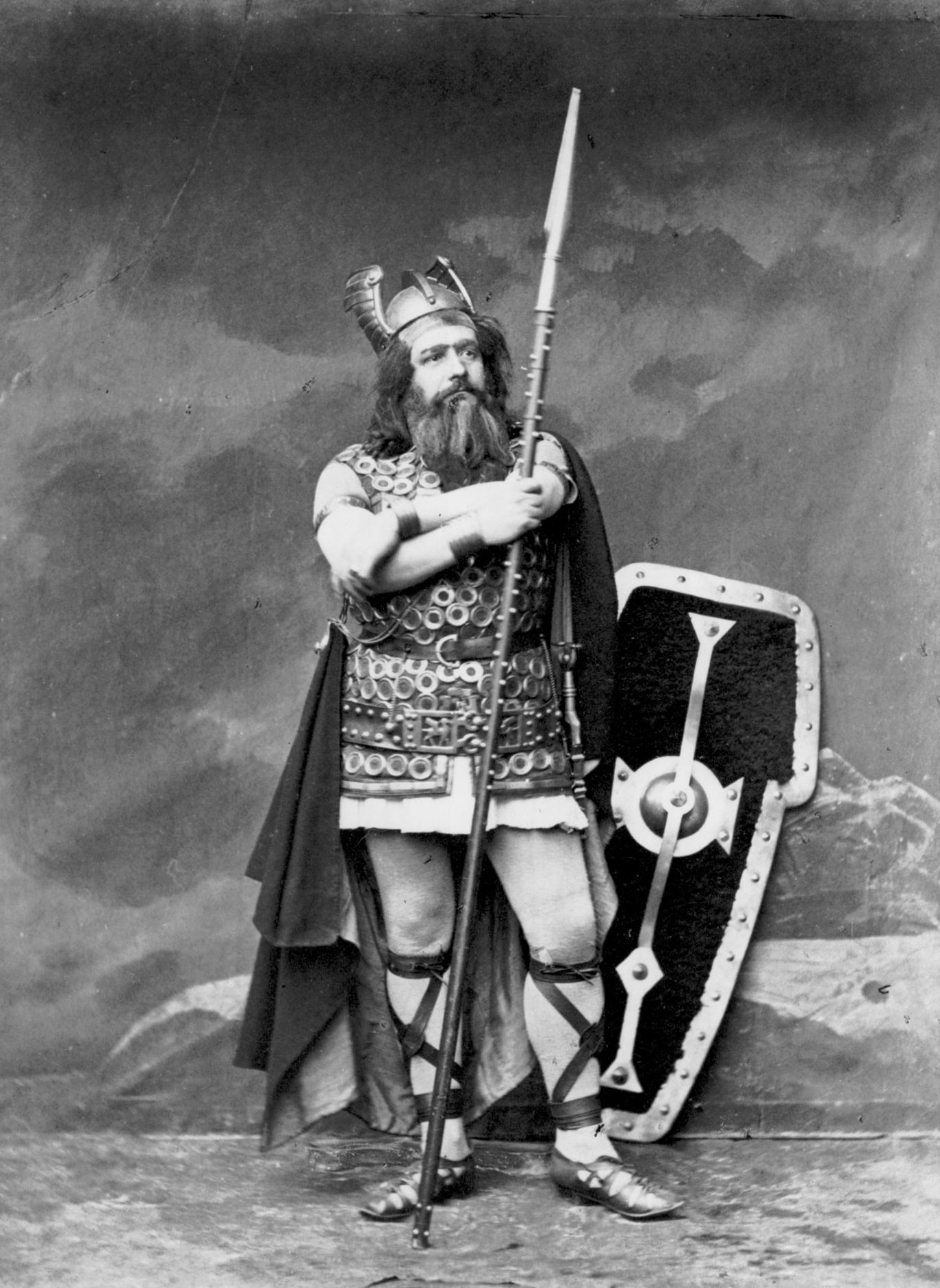
Gustav Siehr as Hagen in Wagners Götterdämmerung, Bayreuth Festival 1876 (picture: Joseph Albert)

Gustav Siehr (17 September 1837 – 18 May 1896) was a German Hofoper- and Kammersänger bass.

== Life ==
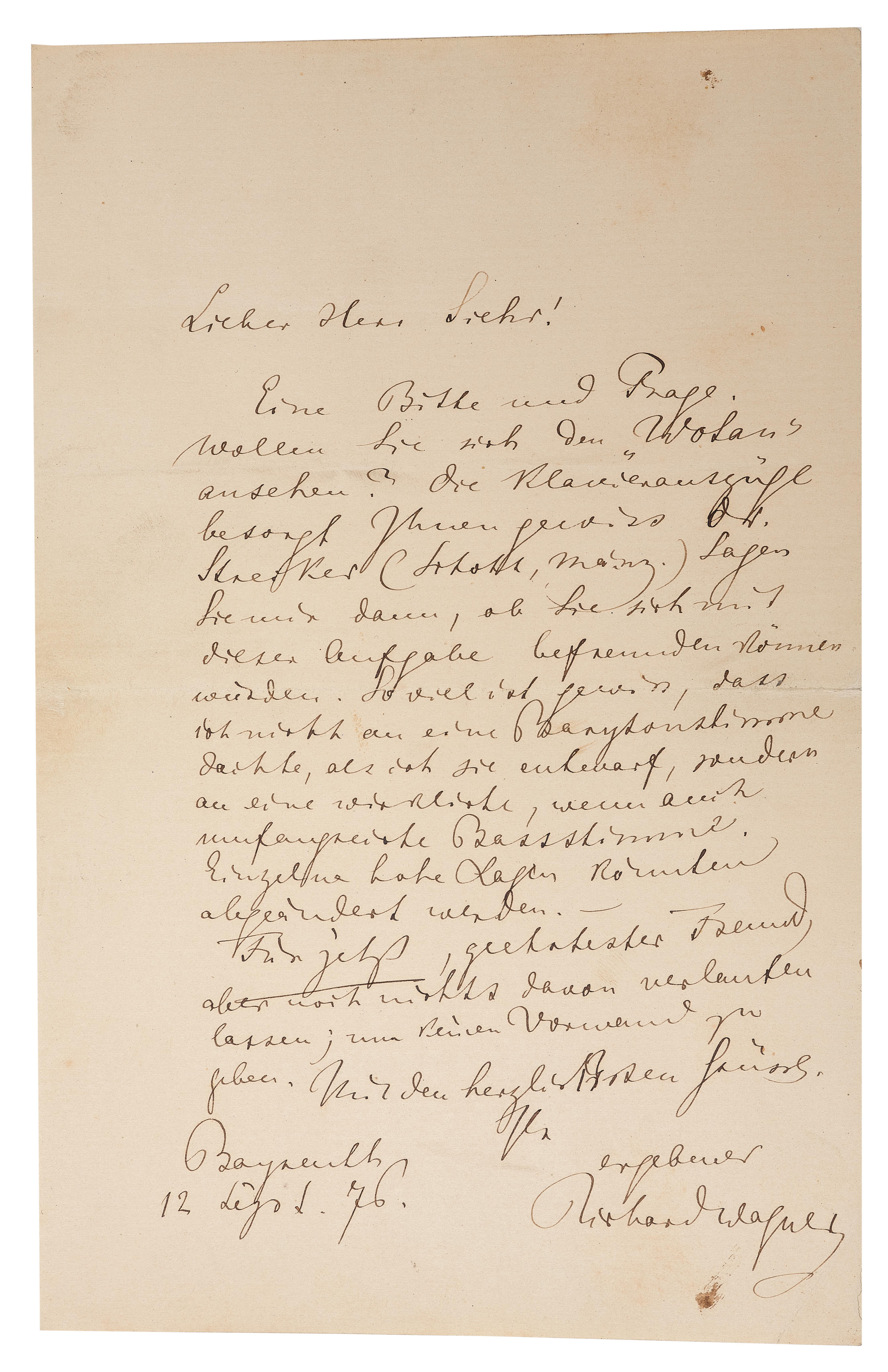
A Letter from Richard Wagner to Gustav Siehr, 12 September 1876. Excerpt: A request and question. Would you like to see the "Wotan"?

Born in Arnsberg, Province of Westphalia, as the son of a senior government councillor, Siehr first studied medicine at University of Königsberg. In 1858, he became a member of the Corps Littuania. As an inaktive, he moved to the University of Jena and the Humboldt University of Berlin. In Berlin, he decided to train his voice with Julius Krause and Heinrich Dorn.

In 1863, Siehr made his debut at the Landestheater Neustrelitz as Oroveso in Bellini's Norma. In 1864–65, he was at the Gothenburg German Opera House, in 1865–70 at the German Theatre Prague, and in 1870–81 at the Hessisches Staatstheater Wiesbaden. At this latter theatre he starred in the world premiere of Jules de Swert's Die Albigenser in 1878.

In 1881, he went to the Bayerische Staatsoper, of which he remained a member until the end of his life. Siehr was considered a great interpreter of the operas of Richard Wagner. He sang repeatedly at the Bayreuth Festivals, roles such as Hagen in the world premiere of Götterdämmerung on 17 August 1876 at the first Festival, Gurnemanz in Parsifal at the 1882–84, 1886 and 1889 festivals, and as King Marke in the Bayreuth premiere cast of Tristan und Isolde at the 1886 Festival. He also sang Gurnemanz in the Privataufführungen for the Bavarian King Ludwig II of Bavaria at the National Theatre Munich. Wagner held the singer in high esteem. He described his vocal delivery and art of characterisation as outstanding.

Siehr died in Munich on May 18, 1896 at the age of 58.
