= Joseph Cooper (broadcaster) =

English pianist and TV presenter

Joseph Elliott Needham Cooper, OBE (7 October 1912 – 4 August 2001) was an English pianist and broadcaster. He was best known as the chairman of the BBC's long-running television panel game Face the Music.

== Early career ==
Cooper was born at Westbury-on-Trym, near Bristol, England, the son of a bank manager. He was educated at Clifton College, and then at Keble College, Oxford, where he was an organ scholar. During the 1930s he worked initially as a church organist and piano teacher before joining the GPO Film Unit, where he wrote incidental music for documentaries, including Mony a Pickle (1938) and A Midsummer Day's Work (1939). Here his colleagues included W. H. Auden and Benjamin Britten.

Cooper had already embarked on career as a concert pianist when the outbreak of the Second World War forced him to give up performing for the duration of hostilities. He resumed his career in 1946, studying briefly with Egon Petri, and making his London debut in 1947. As a concert pianist, Cooper made a number of successful recordings (including some for the World Record Club), and also began broadcasting on radio. In 1946 he assisted Ralph Vaughan Williams with the arrangement of Concerto for Two Pianos and Orchestra.

== Broadcasting compère ==
In 1954, Cooper accepted an invitation to work on the BBC radio quiz show Call the Tune. In 1966, the show transferred to television under the title Face the Music. Transmitted on BBC2 and repeated on BBC1, it ran until 1979 and was briefly revived in 1983–84. The show kept Cooper in the public eye, and the "Hidden Melody" round, a regular feature of the show in which he improvised in the style of a composer and cloaked a well-known tune in his elaborate extemporization, served as a vehicle for his pianistic talent. Face the Music also featured the Dummy Keyboard, in which Cooper played a well-known piano piece on a silent keyboard and the panel had to identify it. The music was gradually faded in for viewers at home. The panellists included Joyce Grenfell, Robin Ray (who had an encyclopedic memory for opus numbers), John Julius Norwich and occasionally Bernard Levin, David Attenborough and Patrick Moore. Cooper's work on Face the Music was captured on a recording by CRD Records, which was released in 1973.

During the 1960s Cooper occasionally appeared as one of the presenters of Here Today, a daily 15-minute light current affairs programme broadcast by TWW. He became known for his acerbic interviewing style and for regularly playing out the programme with a gentle piano piece.

Cooper was appointed OBE in 1982. He was married twice, to Jean Greig (daughter of Louis Greig; from 1947 until her death in 1973) and then Carol Borg (from 1975 until her death in 1996). "He adored sailing (occasionally sailing down the Thames to the Festival Hall for a concert)" and church architecture.

Cooper died in 2001 at Ranmore, near Dorking, leaving an estate valued at over one million pounds.

== Sources ==
- Radio Times, 1954–1984
- Obituary of Joseph Cooper, The Independent, 15 August 2001
