= Concerto for Two Pianos and Orchestra (Vaughan Williams) =

Composition by Ralph Vaughan Williams

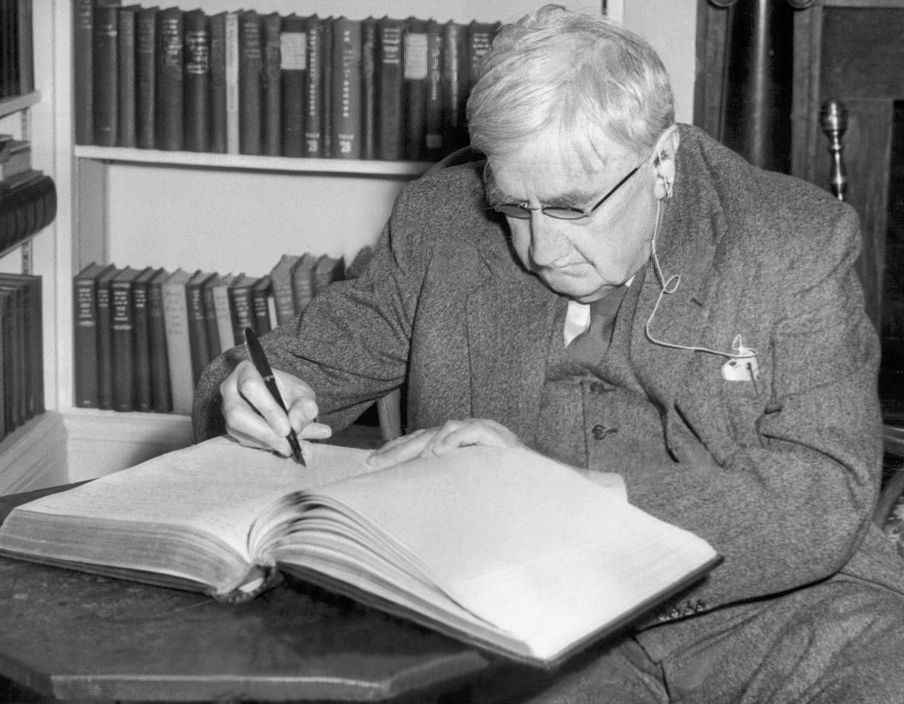
Ralph Vaughan Williams in 1954

The Concerto for Two Pianos and Orchestra is a piano concerto by the British composer Ralph Vaughan Williams. He wrote his solo Piano Concerto in the years between 1926 and 1930, which was first performed in 1933 under Adrian Boult. The piece gained a reputation for being too difficult and demanding, so Vaughan Williams reworked the piece for two pianos with the assistance of Joseph Cooper. This revised edition premiered in 1946.

The piece is difficult, and the piano parts are often percussive and dissonant.

The concerto is in three movements:

1. Toccata: Allegro moderato
2. Romanza: Lento
3. Fuga chromatica (Allegro), con finale alla tedesca

The piece lasts about 25 minutes.
