= Hofoper =

Hofoper is German for a court opera house or company, particularly for imperial, royal, electoral, or princely courts. Many of these have since been renamed Staatsoper ("State Opera") or Städtische Oper ("Municipal Opera") as the courts went defunct.

Hofoper may specifically refer to:

- Berliner Hofoper (before 1844), now the Berlin State Opera (after 1844)
- Hofoper Dresden, now the Semperoper, Dresden
- Mannheim Palace, Mannheim
- Münchner Hofoper, now the Bavarian State Opera, Munich
- Schwetzingen Hofoper, now the Schlosstheater Schwetzingen, Schwetzingen
- Wiener Hofoper (before 1920), now Vienna State Opera
