= The Starlight Express =

1915 play

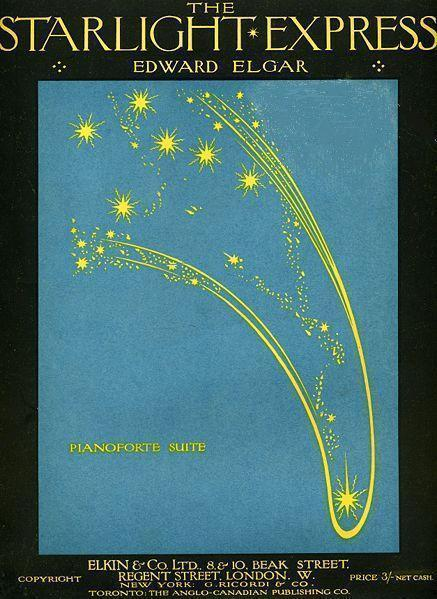
The Starlight Express: cover from 1916

The Starlight Express is a children's play by Violet Pearn, based on the imaginative novel A Prisoner in Fairyland by Algernon Blackwood, with songs and incidental music written by the English composer Sir Edward Elgar in 1915.

== Production ==
On 9 November 1915, Sir Edward Elgar was invited by Robin Legge, music critic of The Daily Telegraph, to write the music for a children's fantasy play to be produced at the Kingsway Theatre that Christmas. The play was The Starlight Express, an adaptation of a novel by Algernon Blackwood called A Prisoner in Fairyland, by Blackwood and Violet Pearn. The baritone and composer Clive Carey had already started his own setting, but abandoned it when Elgar was commissioned.

The producer was to be Basil Dean: but since he had been called up for army service in France, he was replaced by the actress Lena Ashwell. Elgar was soon shown the script by Ashwell and had successful meetings with her and with Blackwood. The story appealed to Elgar because of its similarities to the private fantasy world of his own childhood which he had depicted in the music he wrote for "The Wand of Youth"; his first thought was to re-use that music, and he wove many reminiscences of it into the score. He worked on it enthusiastically, and in just over a month had produced over 300 pages of score – songs and incidental music – in time for the rehearsals. On 6 December the two chosen singers, the Australian-born soprano Clytie Hine and baritone Charles Mott, rehearsed with Elgar.

The Starlight Express was produced by Lena Ashwell at the Kingsway Theatre in London, as one of her high-quality wartime entertainments. The production was announced in The Times, mentioning that the small orchestra pit of the theatre would be enlarged to accommodate a full orchestra. It opened on 29 December 1915. The premiere was to have been the conducted by the composer, but because Lady Elgar had suffered concussion a few days before as the result of a traffic accident, he stayed at home with her, and the conductor was the young Julius Harrison. It ran for only one month, closing on 29 January 1916.

The reasons for the failure were inappropriate design of the characters and scenery by Henry Wilson (who had been chosen and his work approved by Lena Ashwell), and the difficulty Pearn had in making something theatrical with her adaptation of the book. Both Blackwood and Elgar had expressed misgivings about the design, and Blackwood had considered using his right to object and get a new artist. Blackwood objected to "this murder of my simple little Play ... Arts & Crafts pretentious rubbish stitched onto your music by a silly crank who has never read the play". Elgar agreed. This would have meant postponement of the opening. The critics who reported their view of the opening night, while praising the music and particular performers, remarked on the lack of substance to the story. The music did not deserve to be forgotten. Elgar negotiated with The Gramophone Company, and on 18 February 1916, the music was recorded on eight sides, with the songs performed by Agnes Nicholls and Charles Mott. Later that year the three Organ Grinder's Songs were published by Elkin, with a piano accompaniment arranged by Julius Harrison.

== Plot ==
A simplistic version of Blackwood's novel. According to the elgar.org website, "A family of children, trapped in the oppressive world of adults, forms a secret society whose members collect stardust and live in star caves. They seek to rescue their parents from an earthly existence and eventually succeed, taking them also to a star cave."

== Cast of characters ==
Cast list:

- Daddy ("John Henry Campden", an author)
- Mother (his wife "Henrietta")
- Jane Anne ("Jinny", their eldest daughter, aged 17)
- Monkey (their youngest daughter, aged 12)
- Jimbo (their son, aged 10)
- Grannie (Irish mother of Henrietta)
- Cousin Henry ("Henry Rogers", cousin of Daddy)
- Madame Jequier (a Widow, owner of the Pension Wistaria)
- Organ-Grinder (may also be the Tramp)
- Children ('Street Arabs') who accompany the Organ-Grinder before the curtain
- Miss Waghorn and three other retired Governesses
- The Pleiades (dancers)
- Sprites: Tramp, Lamplighter, Gardener, Dustman, Sweep, Woman-of-the-Haystack, Little Winds and Laugher

== Songs ==
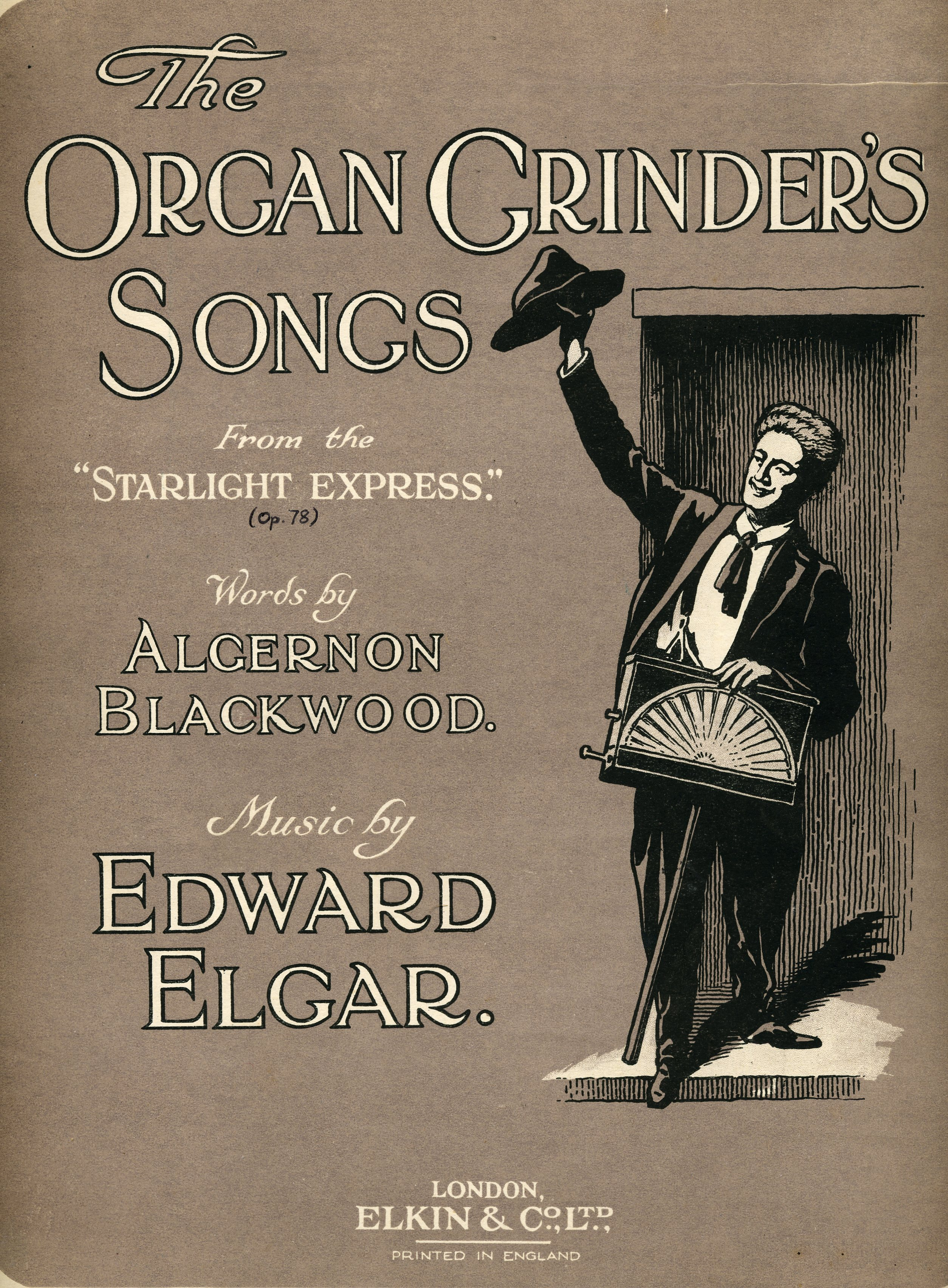
Charles Mott as the Organ Grinder

Act I

1. Organ Grinder (Baritone): "To the Children" – "O children, open your arms to me,"

Act II

2. Organ Grinder: "The Blue-Eyes Fairy" – "There's a fairy that hides"

Act II Scene 1

3. Organ Grinder: "Curfew Song" (Orion) – "The sun has gone"

4. Laugher (Soprano): "The Laugher's Song" – "I'm ev'rywhere"

5. Organ Grinder: "Come Little Winds" – "Wake up you little night winds"

Act II Scene 3

6. Laugher: "Tears and Laughter" – "Oh! stars shine brightly!"

7. Jane Anne (Soprano): "Sunrise Song" (or "Dawn Song") – "We shall meet the morning spiders"

Act III

8. Organ Grinder: "My Old Tunes" – "My old tunes are rather broken"

Act III Scene 1

9. Jane Anne: – "Dandelions, daffodils"

Act III Scene 2

10. Laugher: – "Laugh a little ev'ry day"

11. Organ Grinder: "The Dawn" – "They're all soft-shiny now"

12. Jane Anne: – "Oh, think Beauty"

Act III Finale

13. Jane Anne & Cousin Henry, duet: "Hearts must be soft-shiny dressed" – "Dustman, Laugher, Tramp and busy Sweep"

== Musical quotations ==
From Elgar's The Wand of Youth Suites

- The Little Bells (Scherzino) – in all Acts
- Fairy Pipers – in all Acts
- Sun Dance – interlude at the end of Act II
- Moths and Butterflies – introduction to Act II Scene 3
- March – in Act III

From Elgar's The Music Makers

- a sequence in Jane Anne's song at the end of Act II Scene 2

From the Christmas Carol The First Nowell

- at the end of Act III

== Publications ==
- Piano Suite, arranged by Albert Ketèlbey, pub. Elkin & Co. Ltd. London & New York, 1916
  - To the Children (Organ-Grinder's Song)
  - Dance of the Pleiades
  - Sunrise Song
  - In the Forest
  - "The Blue-Eyes Fairy" (Organ-Grinder's Song)
  - Finale
- Organ Grinder's Songs, piano accompaniment arranged by Julius Harrison, pub. Elkin & Co. Ltd. London & New York, 1916
  - 1. "To the Children"
  - 2. "The Blue-Eyes Fairy"
  - 3. "My Old Tunes"

== Synopsis ==
=== Act I ===
After a short musical overture, the Organ grinder appears in front of the curtain and sings "To the Children". The Song (first at the words "eyes; Let me sleep a moment") includes self-quotations of "The Little Bells" music from "The Wand of Youth".

Song

1. The Organ Grinder: "To the Children"

O children, open your arms to me,
Let your hair fall over my eyes;
Let me sleep a moment – and then awake
In your garden of sweet surprise !
For the grown up folk are a wearisome folk,
And they laugh all my fancies to scorn,
The grown up folk are a wearisome folk,
And they laugh all my fancies to scorn,
They laugh all my fancies to scorn.

O children, open your hearts to me,
And tell me your wonder thoughts,
Who lives in the palace inside your brain?
Who plays in its outer courts?
Who hides in the hours To-morrow holds?
Who sleeps in your Yesterdays?
Who tip-toes along past the curtained folds
Of the shadow that Twilight lays?

O children, open your eyes to me,
And tell me your visions too.
Who squeezes the sponge when the salt tears flow
To dim their magical blue?
Who brushes the fringe of their lace-veined lids?
Who trims their innocent light?
Who draws up the blinds when the sun peeps in?
Who fastens them down at night?

O children, I pray you speak low to me,
And cover my eyes with your hands.
O kiss me again till I sleep and dream
That I'm lost in your fairy-lands;
That I'm lost in your fairy-lands;
For the grown-up folk are a troublesome folk,
And the book of their childhood is torn!
Is blotted, and crumpled, and torn!

The music continues through the curtain rise on the first scene.

==== Scene 1 ====
The curtain rises on a family living in a pension in the mountains of Switzerland, showing grown-ups with problems which are first expressed unaccompanied by music: there is Daddy (an unsuccessful author), Mother (with domestic problems), the pension manager Widow Jequier with residents that do not pay, old Miss Waghorn always searching for her long-lost brother, and Cousin Henry. The children identify with star constellations: Jane Anne the Pleiades, Jimbo the Pole Star, and Monkey with the Great and Little Bear. Cousin Henry is Orion. The children are concerned that the adults who have become 'wumbled' (worried/muddled) need 'sympathy' in the form of star-dust. There is incidental music but there are no songs in this act, which has only one scene.

=== Act II ===
Before the curtain opens, there is a short musical prelude, and the Organ Grinder sings the waltz-song "The Blue-Eyes Fairy".

Song

2. The Organ Grinder: "The Blue-Eyes Fairy"

There's a fairy that hides in the beautiful eyes
Of the children who treat her well;
In the little round hole where the eyeball lies
She weaves her magical Spell.
She is awfully tiny and shy to the sight,
But her magic's past believing,
For she fills you with light and with laughter,
It's the spell of her own sweet weaving.

But! the eyes must be blue,
And the heart must be true,
And the child must be better than gold!
And then if you'll let her,
The quicker the better
She'll make you forget that you're old.

So, if such a child you should chance to see,
Or with such a child to play,
No matter how tired or dull you be,
Nor how many tons you weigh
You will suddenly find that you're young again,
And your movements light and airy
And you'll try to be solemn and stiff in vain-
It's the spell of the Blue-Eyes Fairy.

The scene is concluded by an Entr’acte "In the Forest".

==== Scene 1 ====
Scene 1 – Part 1

The curtain rises during the Entr’acte music. Cousin Henry, Monkey and Jimbo are outside the Star-Cave at the edge of a pine-forest. The cave is too narrow for them to enter. They fall asleep. The Sprites appear and Night falls. The Organ-Grinder sings the Curfew Song. The Sprites hide.

Song

3. The Organ Grinder: "The Curfew Song"

The sun has gone;
The tide of stars is setting all our way,
The Pleiades call softly to Orion,
As nightly they have called these million years;
The children lie asleep; now let them out,
And, over-hearing,
We waft the fairy call into your dreams,
That you may swim upon that tide of gold
And list'ning in your hearts,
Just over-hear
That deep tremendous thunder
Signalling reply:
All's well!
Orion answering the Pleiades!

There is the Dance of the Pleiades as the curtain falls.

Scene 1 – Part 2

The curtain rises. It is now night-time and the children are awake. The introduction includes a violin and harp duet, and the "Little Bells" music from "The Wand of Youth". The Sprites descend from the Starlight Express: they are the Organ Grinder, the Sweep who sweeps worries away, the Dustman with the stardust of sympathy, the Lamplighter who lights up hope (and the stars), the Head Gardener who makes things grow, the Tramp with instinctive simplicity, and the 'Laugher' who sings troubles into joy. The Woman-of-the-Haystack is the mother of them all, borne on the winds.

Song

4. The Laugher: "I'm everywhere"

(laughs)
I'm everywhere,
The universal solvent of despair,
(laughs)
Ah! that sings away the half
Of ev'ry care because I laugh!
I laugh

Song

5. The Organ Grinder: "Come Little Winds"

Wake up, you little Night Winds :
Blow your best !
We want you all -
Ha-ha! that's East and West,
The North Wind too,
She always blows the strongest:
You all must draw your deepest breath and longest,
With open mouth!

Now go and blow the Haystack out of bed!
Whistle her dreams of straw across the sky
And whirl her canvas skirts about her head -
You can but try!
Go, sweep her to'ards the Cave, and break her trance:
Thick Mother of the Sprites -
She must get in:
Even a Haystack's elephantine dance
Is somewhere thin!
Is somewhere thin!

Interlude

The "Sun Dance" and "Moths and Butterflies" music from the "Wand of Youth"

==== Scene 2 ====
Prelude

The prelude includes a quotation from the "Fairy Pipers" of "The Wand of Youth". The Sprites enter the cave and scatter stardust on the sleeping villagers. The Dustman scatters the finest dust on the ancient Miss Waghorn, who rests from the search for her brother. The Lamplighter exits to tend "the fires that are going out round the world."

==== Scene 3 ====
The Introduction while the curtain rises includes "Moths and Butterflies" from "The Wand of Youth".

Song

6. The Laugher: "Tears and Laughter"

Oh! stars shine brightly!
He's sleeping tightly !
His pattern's pouring through!

Oh! Sprites come swiftly!
Unwumble deftly!
The world has need of you!
They'll listen to my song
And understand
That, exiled over long,
From Fairyland,
The weary world has rather lost its way!
Rather lost its way!
My secret's double,
For tears of trouble
Are really tears of laughter gone astray.

Song

7. Soprano (Jane Anne's song): "Dawn Song"

We shall meet the morning spiders,
The fairy cotton riders,
Each mounted, each mounted on a star's reflected ray.
With their tiny nets of feather.
They collect our thoughts together,
And on strips of windy weather bring the Day,
And on strips of windy weather bring the Day!

The curtain falls at the end of the scene.

=== Act III ===
After a short prelude which includes part of the "March" from "The Wand of Youth", The Organ Grinder sings "My Old Tunes".

Song

8. The Organ Grinder: "My Old Tunes"

My old tunes are rather broken
And they come from far away,
Bring just a little token
Of a long-forgotten day;
When the children came to listen,
T'other side the garden fence,
And my heart leapt out of prison
At the gift – of seven pence!

Just beyond the Haystack's shadow,
Long ago, that leafy June,
How they danced about the meadow
At the rising of the moon!
While from out a railway carriage,
Standing ready and alight,
Stepped their guests as to a marriage -
Asked to dine – and stay the night!

Sweep and Laugher danced together,
And a man who had a lamp
Capered lightly as a feather
With a lazy-looking Tramp;
When a Voice disturbed the Lancers:
"Children, come, it's time for bed"
Railway carriage, Sprites and Dancers
Flew up to the stars instead!

Now I am a Constellation,
Free from ev'ry earthly care,
Playing nightly at my station
For the Big and Little Bear.
But my tunes are still entrancing
As that night in leafy June,
When I caught the children dancing
With the Sprites beneath the moon!

Still the children come to hear me
In the lane or dingy street;
Still the heavy pavement near me
Flutters to their happy feet;
For my tunes are ne'er forgotten,
And they bring the scent of musk:
Grown-up folk may call 'em rotten,
But I'm looked for when it's dusk!

==== Scene 1 ====
The curtain rises on Jane Anne.

Song

9. Jane Anne: "Dandelions, daffodils"

Dandelions, daffodils,
Sheets of yaller roses,
Goldenrods and Marigolds,
Buttercups for posies!

The curtain closes for the Entr’acte which is the "Blue-Eyes Fairy" Waltz, and this is followed by the "Dance of the Pleiades".

==== Scene 2 ====
The final scene is the Pine forest by night, before the Star Cave.

Madame Jequier rejoices because Cousin Henry has secretly paid all the debts of her pension. Daddy enters, speaking through the "Starlight" music:

...The source of our life is hid with Beauty very, very far away. Our real continuous life is spiritual. The bodily life uses what it can bring over from this enormous under-running sea of universal consciousness where we are all together, splendid, free, untamed; where thinking is creation, and where we see and know each other face to face...

Song

10. The Laugher: "Laugh a little ev'ry day"

Laugh a little ev'ry day
At yourself, that is to say.
Plan it, seed it.
Millions want it.
Hark! Their dreams
Have split the seams.

Song

11. Organ Grinder: "The Dawn"

They're all soft-shiny now
The time draws near;
Their hearts are dusted
And the path's swept clear!
The tide of stars is setting all one way,
Bring on the dawn – yet not the dawn of day!

Incidental music, including the "Dance of the Pleides" and "Fairy Pipers" from "The Wand of Youth".

Song

12. Jane Anne: "Oh, think Beauty"

Oh, think Beauty,
It's your duty.
Ev'ry loving gentle thought
Of this fairy brilliance wrought.
While the busy Pleiades,
Sisters to the Hyades,
Seven by seven,
Across the Heaven.

=== Finale ===
The stone is rolled away from the Star-cave. The scene is brightened by the entrance of the Sprites, and the humans enter. The ghost of Miss Waghorn enters 'clothed in light'.

Song

13. Jane Anne and Cousin Henry (Organ Grinder):

Jane Anne (Laugher):

Dustman, Laugher, Tramp and busy Sweep,
Head Gardener too,
The world now waking from her heavy sleep
Has need of You!
Gypsy, Lampman, come! take of our best,
Our sweetest dust
And sow earth's little gardens of unrest
With joy and trust -
For ev'ry hour
A golden flower,
For ev'ry hour
A golden flower,
Love, Laughter, Courage, Hope, and all the

Duet

Jane Anne and Cousin Henry (Organ Grinder):

JA ( rest – - – - – -. . . . . . . . . . . . . . . . .)
CH( Hearts must be soft-shiny dressed )

( . . . . . . . . . . . . . . . . . . . . .)
( With your softest, sweetest )

( With your softest, sweetest best. )
( best – - – . . . . . . . . . . . . . . . . . . )

( Dust, that comes from very )
( . . . . . . . . . . . . . . . . . . . . )

( far. Ah! – - – - – - – - – - – - – - – - – -)
( Daddy's pattern, heart and brain )

( - – - – - – - – - – - – - – - – - – - – - – - -)
( Sprinkle with the golden, golden )

( Hearts must be soft-shiny dressed . .)
( rain, with your softest, sweetest best )

( With your softest, sweetest golden dust! )
( - – dust, With your softest, sweetest, . . . )

( For the rising of the star.)
( For the rising of the star.)

The Star of Bethlehem rises while the melody of the Christmas carol "The First Nowell" merges into the music.

== Contemporary review ==
Review from the weekly magazine "Punch", 5 January 1916. The reviewer, the drama critic Joseph Thorp, used to sign himself "T".

Curiously, Clytie Hine, 'The Laugher', gets no mention. The Musical Times thought well of her.

The Starlight Express

Daddy .............. O. B. Clarence

Mother ............. Ruth Maitland

Grannie ............ Una O'Connor

Jimbo ............... Ronald Hammond

Monkey ............ Elsie Hall

Jane Anne ........ Mercia Cameron

Cousin Henry .... Owen Roughwood

Mme Jequier ..... Juliette Mylo

Miss Waghorn ... Mary Barton

Tramp ............... Charles Mott

It would be uncandid to pretend that Mr. ALGERNON BLACKWOOD gets everything he has to say in The Starlight Express safely across the footlights – those fateful barriers that trap so many excellent intentions. But he so evidently has something to say, and the saying is so gallantly attempted, that he must emphatically be credited with something done – something well done really. The little play has beautiful moments – and that is to say a great deal.

The novelist turned playwright wishes to make you see that "the Earth's forgotten it's a Star". In plainer words he wants to present you with a cure for "wumbledness": people who look at the black side of things, who think chiefly of themselves – those are the wumbled. The cure is stardust – which is sympathy. The treatment was discovered by the children of a poor author in a cheap Swiss pension and by "Cousin Henry" a successful business man of quite an unusual sort. You have to get out into the cave where the starlight is stored, gather it – with the help of the Organ Grinder, who loves all children and sings his cheery way to the stars; and the Gardener who makes good things grow and picks up all the weeds; and the Lamplighter who lights up heads and hearts and stars impartially; and the Sweep, who sweeps away all blacks and blues over the edge of the world; and the Dustman, with his sack of Dream Dust that is Star Dust (or isn't it?) and so forth.

Then you sprinkle the precious stuff on people and they become miracles of content and unselfishness (The fact that life isn't in the very least like that is a thing you have just got to make yourself forget for three hours or so).

The author was well served by his associates. SIR EDWARD ELGAR wove a delightfully patterned music of mysterious import through the queer tangle of the scenes and gave us an atmosphere loaded with the finest stardust. Lighting and setting were admirably contrived; and the grouping of the little prologue scenes, where that kindly handsome giant of an organ-grinder (MR. CHARLES MOTT), with the superbly cut corduroys, sang so tunefully to as sweet a flock of little maids as one would wish to see, was particularly effective.

Of the players I would especially commend the delicately sensitive performance of MISS MERCIA CAMERON (a name and talent quite new to me) as Jane Anne, the chief opponent of wumbledom. She was, I think, responsible more than any other for getting some of the mystery of the authentic Blackwood craft across to the audience. The jolly spontaneity of RONALD HAMMOND as young Bimbo was a pleasant thing, and ELSIE HALL, concealing less successfully her careful training in the part, prettily co-operated as his sister Monkey. The part of Daddy, the congested author who was either "going to light the world or burst" was in O. B. CLARENCE'S clever sympathetic hands. MR OWEN ROUGHWOOD gave you a sense of his belief in the efficacy of stardust. On what a difficult rail our author was occasionally driving his express you may judge, when he makes this excellent but not particularly fragile British type exclaim "I am melting down in dew". The flippant hearer has always to be inhibiting irreverent speculations occasioned by such speeches.

I couldn't guess if the children in the audience liked it. I hope they didn't feel they had been spoofed, as MAETERLINCK so basely spoofed them in The Blue Bird, by offering them a grown-up's play "sicklied o'er with the pale cast of thought". But the bigger children gave the piece a good welcome and called and acclaimed the shrinking author.

== Legacy ==
- The Starlight Express was not the only collaboration of Blackwood and Pearn. Note

Karma: A Re-Incarnation Play in Prologue, Epilogue & Three Acts. London: Macmillan, 1918 and New York: E.P. Dutton, 1918. "A love story re-enacted through four existences."
Through The Crack (an adaptation of The Education of Uncle Paul by Blackwood). London and New York: Samuel French. Produced at Christmas 1920, then in 1925.

- On 22 May 1918, Lance Corporal Charles James Mott, the successful singer in that first production of The Starlight Express was in the London Regiment (Artists' Rifles) when he was mortally wounded by a German shell-burst. He was 37. Elgar, writing to a friend, said "It is difficult to believe that Charles Mott is dead; dead of wounds in France. I am overwhelmed: a simple, honest GOOD soul."
- In 1933 the conductor Joseph Lewis constructed from the score a 40-minute selection from The Starlight Express which he conducted in several BBC radio broadcasts. But his score and other valuable BBC material was destroyed in an air-raid in 1940.
- In September 1940 the Kingsway Theatre was damaged by fire in an air raid. All The Starlight Express stage props and music (conductor's score and orchestra parts) was destroyed. However, Elgar had left his manuscript full score of the music with the publishers, Messrs Elkin & Co., and apart from memories and reviews, this became the only surviving remnant. Fortunately this score also contained many of his own written notes on the performance. The score is signed "Edward Elgar, Finis, A.E. December 1915" – A. E. was his wife's initials, and Elgar, typically doubled the pun with the inscription "AE 15" (abbreviated Latin "AETATIS 15", English "Age 15"): he was a child again!
- In 1984 Richard Adams provided a 'performing narrative' to accompany a performance of Elgar's score in the Netherlands. The narrator for the occasion was composer Michael Berkeley.

== Recordings ==
- On 18–19 February 1916, a selection of the songs and music were given an acoustic recording at the studios of His Master's Voice, Hayes, by The Gramophone Company. The singers were Charles Mott and Agnes Nicholls, and Elgar conducted the "Symphony Orchestra". There were four 12-inch records (D455-8): (1) To the Children and The Blue-Eyes Fairy (Mott); (2) My Old Tunes and Curfew Song (Mott); (3) Come Little Winds (Mott), Wind Dance (orchestra), Tears and Laughter and Sunrise Song (Nicholls); (4) The Laugher's Song (Nicholls) and Finale – Hearts must be soft-shiny dressed (Nicholls and Mott).
- In December 1935, four of the songs were recorded at the studios of His Master's Voice, Hayes, by The Gramophone Company. The singers were Stuart Robertson and his wife Alice Moxon. It is not known who conducted the orchestra. The songs were To the Children, The Laugher's Song, The Blue-Eyes Fairy and My Old Tunes.
- On 26 September 1946, two of the Organ Grinder's songs (My old tunes and To the Children) were recorded at Decca Studios in London. The singer was Henry Cummings, with an orchestra conducted by Charles Groves (in his first recording session).
- In 1964 EMI/His Master's Voice released The Miniature Elgar inspired by the BBC-TV Monitor film. It included the songs My old Tunes and To the Children, performed by Frederick Harvey with the Royal Philharmonic Orchestra conducted by Lawrance Collingwood.
- In 1973, Chandos Records recorded some of the songs, performed by John Lawrenson and Cynthia Glover, with Michael Austin (organ) and the Bournemouth Sinfonietta conducted by George Hurst. The songs were To the Children, The Blue-Eyes Fairy, The Laugher's Song, Tears and Laughter, The Dawn Song, My Old Tunes, Jane Anne's song and Finale.
- In 1974–1975, a complete recording was made by EMI/His Master's Voice on 28/29 November and 20/22 December 1974 and 22 October 1975, at Abbey Road Studios, London. The singers were Derek Hammond-Stroud and Valerie Masterson, with the London Philharmonic Orchestra conducted by Vernon Handley.
- In December 1990 some of the songs were recorded by Decca Records at the Brangwyn Hall, Swansea. The singers were Bryn Terfel and Alison Hagley, with the Welsh National Opera Chorus and Welsh National Opera Orchestra conducted by Sir Charles Mackerras. The songs were To the Children, The Blue-Eyes Fairy, The Laugher's Song, Come Little Winds, Tears and Laughter, The Dawn Song, My Old Tunes, Jane Anne's song and Finale. This was remastered in 1997.
- A 1992 Koss Classics release of lesser-known works by Elgar, performed by the Indianapolis Symphony Orchestra under the direction of Raymond Leppard, included the orchestral Overture and Finale.
