= Wedding of Prince George and Princess Marina =

1934 British royal wedding

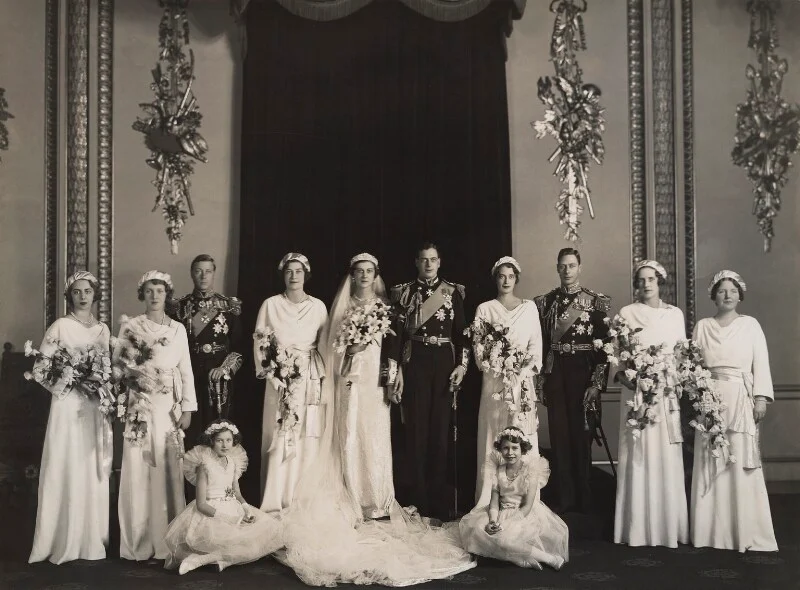
- George and Marina with their bridesmaids and groomsmen
- Date: 29 November 1934; 91 years ago
- Venue: Westminster Abbey; Buckingham Palace
- Location: London, England
- Participants: Prince George, Duke of Kent; Princess Marina of Greece and Denmark

The wedding of Prince George, Duke of Kent, and Princess Marina of Greece and Denmark took place on Thursday, 29 November 1934, at Westminster Abbey. The Duke of Kent was the fourth son of King George V and Queen Mary (née Princess Victoria Mary of Teck), while Princess Marina was the youngest daughter of Prince Nicholas of Greece and Denmark and Grand Duchess Elena Vladimirovna of Russia. The couple were second cousins through mutual descent from King Christian IX of Denmark.

As Princess Marina's cousin, Prince Philip, renounced his Greek and Danish titles prior to marrying Prince George's niece, then Princess Elizabeth, this is the most recent example of a marriage between a British prince or princess and a titled member of a foreign dynasty.

== Engagement ==
The engagement between the Duke of Kent and Princess Marina of Greece and Denmark was announced on 28 August 1934. The news came as a surprise to the British public. The couple began courting after reconnecting at the home of Princess Marina's brother-in-law, Prince Paul of Yugoslavia, on Lake Bohinj in present-day Slovenia. The Duke presented Princess Marina with a platinum ring with a 7-carat square Kashmir sapphire with two baguette diamonds on either side. A first for a royal couple, they spoke to Movietone News shortly after announcing their engagement.

Princess Marina and her parents arrived in Dover on board the ferry TSS Canterbury on 22 November. met by Prince George. The Princess and her parents, accompanied by Prince George, travelled to London where they were met at Victoria Station by the King and Queen, the Prince of Wales and the Duke and Duchess of York.

On the eve of the wedding, the couple and their parents attended a performance of the play Theatre Royal by George S. Kaufman and Edna Ferber at the Lyric Theatre.

== Wedding ==
The Duke of Kent and Princess Marina were married first in an Anglican service according to the Book of Common Prayer conducted by Cosmo Gordon Lang, Archbishop of Canterbury, assisted by William Foxley Norris, Dean of Westminster. A second Greek Orthodox service was performed by Germanos Strenopoulos, Archbishop of Thyateira and Great Britain, in the Private Chapel at Buckingham Palace.

=== Attendants ===
The Duke of Kent was supported by his two eldest brothers, the Prince of Wales and the Duke of York. Princess Marina was attended by eight bridesmaids:

- Princess Irene of Greece and Denmark, a cousin of the bride
- Princess Katherine of Greece and Denmark, a cousin of the bride
- Princess Eugénie of Greece and Denmark, a cousin of the bride
- Grand Duchess Kira Kirillovna of Russia, a cousin of the bride
- Princess Juliana of the Netherlands, first half-cousin once removed of the bride
- Lady Iris Mountbatten, a paternal cousin once removed of the groom
- Princess Elizabeth of York, a niece of the groom
- Lady Mary Cambridge, a maternal cousin once removed of the groom

=== Attire ===
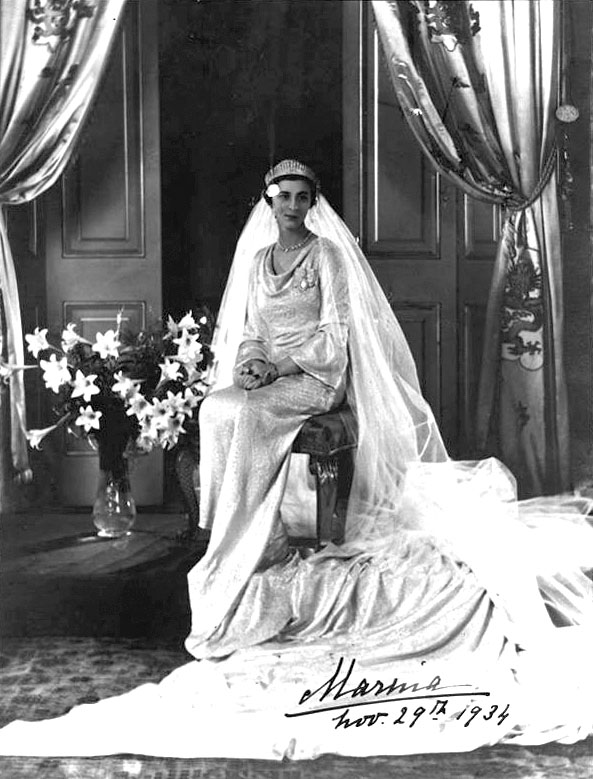
Princess Marina on her wedding day

Marina's wedding dress was designed by Edward Molyneux, who had worked with her previously. The dress was made from white silk and silver lamé brocade, with a raised English rose design. The dress's simplicity was praised in Vogue: "the sum of that simple perfection which distinguishes her whole Molyneux trousseau, and which only a fine personal taste could have achieved." Marina wore an ermine cape, given to her by the King, over her dress en route to the Abbey and on the balcony of Buckingham Palace.

The Duke of Kent wore ceremonial day dress of the Royal Navy with the insignia of the Order of the Garter, Order of St Michael and St George and the Royal Victorian Order.

=== Music ===
Prior to the service, works by Bach, Handel and Elgar were played on the organ. During the arrival of the groom, Trumpet Tune and Airs by Henry Purcell was played. The bride walked down the aisle to Sir Hubert Parry's bridal march from The Birds. Hymns sung during the service include "Praise, my soul, the King of heaven." Ernest Bullock composed a new anthem specially for the wedding. The ceremony finished with Felix Mendelssohn's "Wedding March"

=== Guests ===
==== Relatives of the groom ====
- The King and Queen, the groom's parents
  - The Prince of Wales, the groom's brother
  - The Duke and Duchess of York, the groom's brother and sister-in-law
    - Princess Elizabeth of York, the groom's niece
    - Princess Margaret of York, the groom's niece
  - The Princess Royal and the Earl of Harewood, the groom's sister and brother-in-law
  - The Duke of Gloucester, the groom's brother
- The Princess Victoria, the groom's paternal aunt
- The Queen and King of Norway, the groom's paternal aunt and uncle
- Princess Helena Victoria, the groom's paternal first cousin once removed
- The Duke of Connaught and Strathearn, the groom's paternal great-uncle
  - Prince and Princess Arthur of Connaught, the groom's paternal first cousin once removed and paternal first cousin
- The Earl of Athlone and Princess Alice, Countess of Athlone, the groom's maternal uncle and aunt (also paternal first cousin once removed)
- The Princess Beatrice, the groom's paternal great-aunt
  - The Marquess of Carisbrooke's family:
    - Lady Iris Mountbatten, the groom's paternal second cousin
- The Marquess and Marchioness of Cambridge, the groom's maternal first cousin and his wife
  - Lady Mary Cambridge, the groom's maternal first cousin once removed

==== Relatives of the bride ====
- Prince and Princess Nicholas of Greece and Denmark, the bride's parents
  - Princess and Prince Paul of Yugoslavia, the bride's sister and brother-in-law
    - Prince Nicholas of Yugoslavia, the bride’s nephew
  - Princess Elizabeth, Countess of Törring-Jettenbach and the Count of Törring-Jettenbach, the bride's sister and brother-in-law
- King George II of the Hellenes, the bride's paternal first cousin
- Princess Helen of Romania, the bride's paternal first cousin
- Princess Irene of Greece and Denmark, the bride's paternal first cousin
- Princess Katherine of Greece and Denmark, the bride's paternal first cousin
- Prince and Princess George of Greece and Denmark, the bride's paternal uncle and aunt
  - Prince Peter of Greece and Denmark, the bride's paternal first cousin
  - Princess Eugénie of Greece and Denmark, the bride's paternal first cousin
- The Hereditary Princess and Hereditary Prince of Hohenlohe-Langenburg, the bride’s paternal first cousin and her husband, the groom’s paternal second cousin
- The Hereditary Grand Duchess and Hereditary Grand Duke of Hesse and by Rhine, the bride’s paternal first cousin and her husband, the groom’s paternal second cousin
- Prince Philip of Greece and Denmark, the bride's paternal first cousin
- Prince and Princess Christopher of Greece and Denmark, the bride's paternal uncle and aunt
- Grand Duke Kirill Vladimirovich and Grand Duchess Victoria Feodorovna of Russia, the bride's maternal uncle and aunt (also the groom's paternal first cousin once removed)
  - Grand Duchess Kira Kirillovna of Russia, the bride's maternal first cousin
  - Grand Duke Vladimir Kirillovich of Russia, the bride’s maternal first cousin
- Princess Catherine Alexandrovna Yurievskaya, the bride's maternal half-grandaunt

==== Foreign royal guests ====
- The King and Queen of Denmark and Iceland, the bride and groom's mutual first cousin once removed, and his wife, the bride's maternal first cousin once removed
- Prince Valdemar of Denmark, the bride and groom's mutual granduncle
- The Count of Flanders, the groom's paternal third cousin once removed
- Princess Juliana of the Netherlands, the bride's maternal half-first cousin once removed
- The Duke of Östergötland, the bride and groom’s mutual paternal second cousin
- Infante Juan of Spain, the groom’s paternal second cousin

==== Other notable guests ====
- The Rt Hon. Ramsay MacDonald, Prime Minister of the United Kingdom
- The Rt Hon. Stanley Baldwin, Lord President of the Council
- The Rt Hon. David Lloyd George, former Prime Minister of the United Kingdom
- Ernest and Wallis Simpson

=== Gifts ===
King George V presented his new daughter-in-law with a 36-stone diamond collet necklace which she wore on her wedding day. From Queen Mary, Princess Marina received a historic diamond and sapphire parure which had belonged to the Duchess of Cambridge. The City of London gave Princess Marina a diamond fringe tiara. Princess Nicholas gave her daughter a large diamond bow brooch. The Australian Government sent two small cups made of Australian gold. The Royal School of Needlework made a quilt for Princess Marina and the Duke of Kent. The gifts were displayed at St James's Palace.

=== Reception ===
A reception was held afterwards in the State Rooms of Buckingham Palace. Music at the reception was provided by the Royal Artillery Band.

The couple received congratulations from various world leaders, including Adolf Hitler.

=== Coverage ===
It was the first British royal wedding to be broadcast live on the radio. With the use of other technology, such as microphones—the control room was located underneath the Unknown Warrior's tomb of Westminster Abbey. The service was broadcast locally and abroad to other nations, and loudspeakers allowed spectators from outside the abbey to hear the proceedings.

== Honeymoon ==
The couple spent their honeymoon at Himley Hall in Staffordshire.
