= Mike Bryan (musician) =

American jazz guitarist

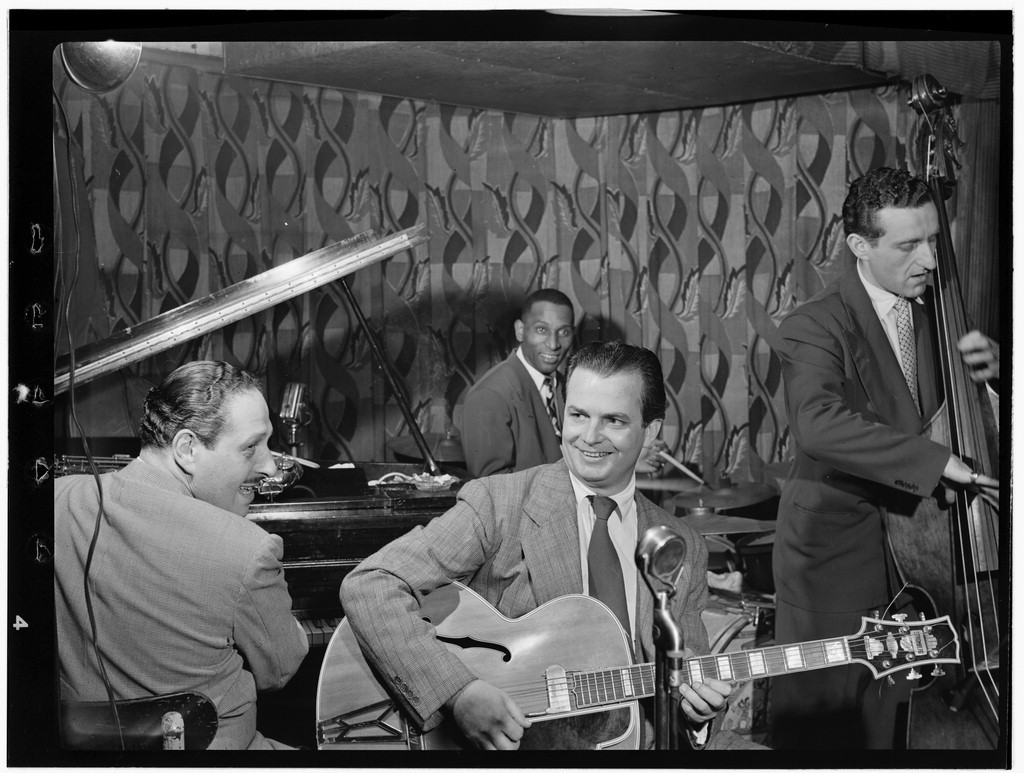
- Bryan with Sanford Gold, Cozy Cole, and Jack Lesberg at the Famous Door, New York City, c. October 1947

Background information
- Born: Michael Neely Bryan; August 9, 1916; Byhalia, Mississippi, U.S.
- Died: August 20, 1972 (aged 56) Glendale, California, U.S.
- Genres: Jazz, swing, big band
- Occupation: Musician
- Instrument: Guitar
- Years active: 1934–1972
- Spouse: Iris Mountbatten (m. 1957; div. 1957)

Michael Neely Bryan (August 9, 1916 – August 20, 1972) was an American jazz guitarist.

== Biography ==
Bryan was a self-taught guitarist born in Byhalia, Mississippi on August 9, 1916. Bryan is best known for his time playing with Benny Goodman and his contribution to a series of television documentaries sponsored by the Goodyear Tire Company featuring jazz musicians. He began his career playing in the Memphis area until 1935 when he joined Red Nichols in Chicago. After that, he led his own band in Greenwood, Mississippi from 1938 to 1939. From November 1940 until May 1941, Bryan worked with Benny Goodman and played with the big bands of Bob Chester, Jan Savitt, and Artie Shaw until he joined the United States Army from March 1942 until November 1944.

In December 1942, author Ursula Parrott became the subject of national coverage when she was brought up on federal charges of attempting to help Bryan escape from the Miami Beach Army stockade. However, she was acquitted by the jury at her trial.

After his time in the military, Bryan worked with some emerging bebop musicians like Dizzy Gillespie and Charlie Parker in their small groups. He rejoined Benny Goodman from January 1945 until September 1946 and recorded with both the sextet and the orchestra. Bryan spent several years doing studio work in California. In addition he produced a series of foreign television documentaries for the Goodyear Tire Company featuring jazz musicians such as Louis Armstrong and Duke Ellington.

In 1962, he toured Europe as music director of a band also sponsored by Goodyear. In 1966, he toured Vietnam with Martha Raye. On 5 May 1957 he married Lady Iris Mountbatten, only child of Alexander Mountbatten, 1st Marquess of Carisbrooke and a great-granddaughter of Queen Victoria. They divorced months later and had one child, Robin Alexander Bryan (born Mount Sinai Hospital, Manhattan, New York City, 20 December 1957), who has three natural children from three different women. He died of leukemia at Glendale Hospital in 1972.

== Bibliography ==
- Chilton, John (1985). Who's Who of Jazz: Storyville to Swing Street. New York NY, Da Capo Press.
- Claghorn, Charles Eugene (1982). Biographical Dictionary of Jazz. Englewood Cliffs NJ, Prentice-Hall, Inc: 53.
- Feather, Leonard and Gitler, Ira (1999). The Biographical Encyclopedia of Jazz. New York NY, Oxford University Press: 90.
- Kernfeld, Barry (2002). The New Grove Dictionary of Jazz. Taunton MA, Macmillan Publishers Limited. 1:336.
- Larkin, Colin (1999). The Virgin Encyclopedia of Jazz. London, Virgin Books: 131–132.
