= Irene Mountbatten, Marchioness of Carisbrooke =

British noblewoman (1890–1956)

The Most Honourable The Marchioness of Carisbrooke GBE, DStJ
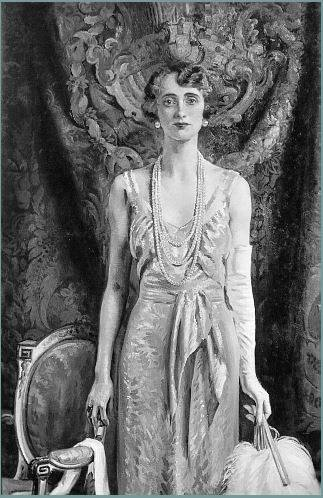
- Marchioness of Carisbrooke, William Bruce Ellis Ranken, c. 1930
- Born: 4 July 1890; London, England
- Died: 16 July 1956 (aged 66); London, England
- Resting place: Ashes interred at St. Mildred's Church, Whippingham, Isle of Wight
- Spouse: Alexander Mountbatten, 1st Marquess of Carisbrooke (m. 1917)
- Children: Lady Iris Mountbatten
- Parent(s): William Denison, 2nd Earl of Londesborough; Lady Grace Fane

Coat of arms of the Marchioness of Carisbrooke as dame of the Royal Order of Noble Ladies of Queen Maria Luisa

Irene Frances Adza Mountbatten, Marchioness of Carisbrooke (née Denison; 4 July 1890 – 16 July 1956) was a British aristocrat and society figure. She was the daughter of William Francis Henry Denison, 2nd Earl of Londesborough, and Lady Grace Adelaide Denison, daughter of Francis Fane, 12th Earl of Westmorland. Through her marriage, she became a member of the extended British royal family.

In 1917, Irene married Alexander Mountbatten, 1st Marquess of Carisbrooke, a grandson of Queen Victoria in the female line and a member of the Mountbatten family. Upon her husband's elevation to the marquessate, she assumed the title of Marchioness of Carisbrooke.

Lady Irene was also notable for her involvement in women's organisations. In 1929, she became the first president of the Women's Automobile and Sports Association, reflecting her interest in the advancement of women's participation in motoring and competitive sport.

== Marriage and issue ==
She married Alexander, 1st Marquess of Carisbrooke, son of Prince Henry of Battenberg and Princess Beatrice of the United Kingdom, on 19 July 1917 at the Chapel Royal, St. James's Palace, London.

Lady Irene and Alexander, 1st Marquess of Carisbrooke had one child, a daughter:

- Lady Iris Victoria Beatrice Grace Mountbatten (13 January 1920 – 1 September 1982)

== Awards ==
She was invested as a Dame Grand Cross of the Order of the British Empire (GBE) and invested as a Dame of Justice of the Order of St John of Jerusalem (DStJ). In Spain, she was invested as a Dame of the Order of Queen Maria Luisa.

She succeeded Princess Beatrice of the United Kingdom as President of the Frank James Memorial Hospital at East Cowes in 1946, carrying on the role until it was taken over by the National Health Service in 1948.

== Death ==
She died on 16 July 1956, aged 66, in London. Her ashes were interred at St. Mildred's Church, Whippingham, Isle of Wight.

== Honours ==
=== British ===
- Dame Grand Cross of the Most Excellent Order of the British Empire
- Dame of Justice of the Most Venerable Order of the Hospital of St John of Jerusalem
- Recipient of the King George VI Coronation Medal

=== Foreign ===
- Spain: 1080th Dame of the Royal Order of Noble Ladies of Queen Maria Luisa

== Citations ==
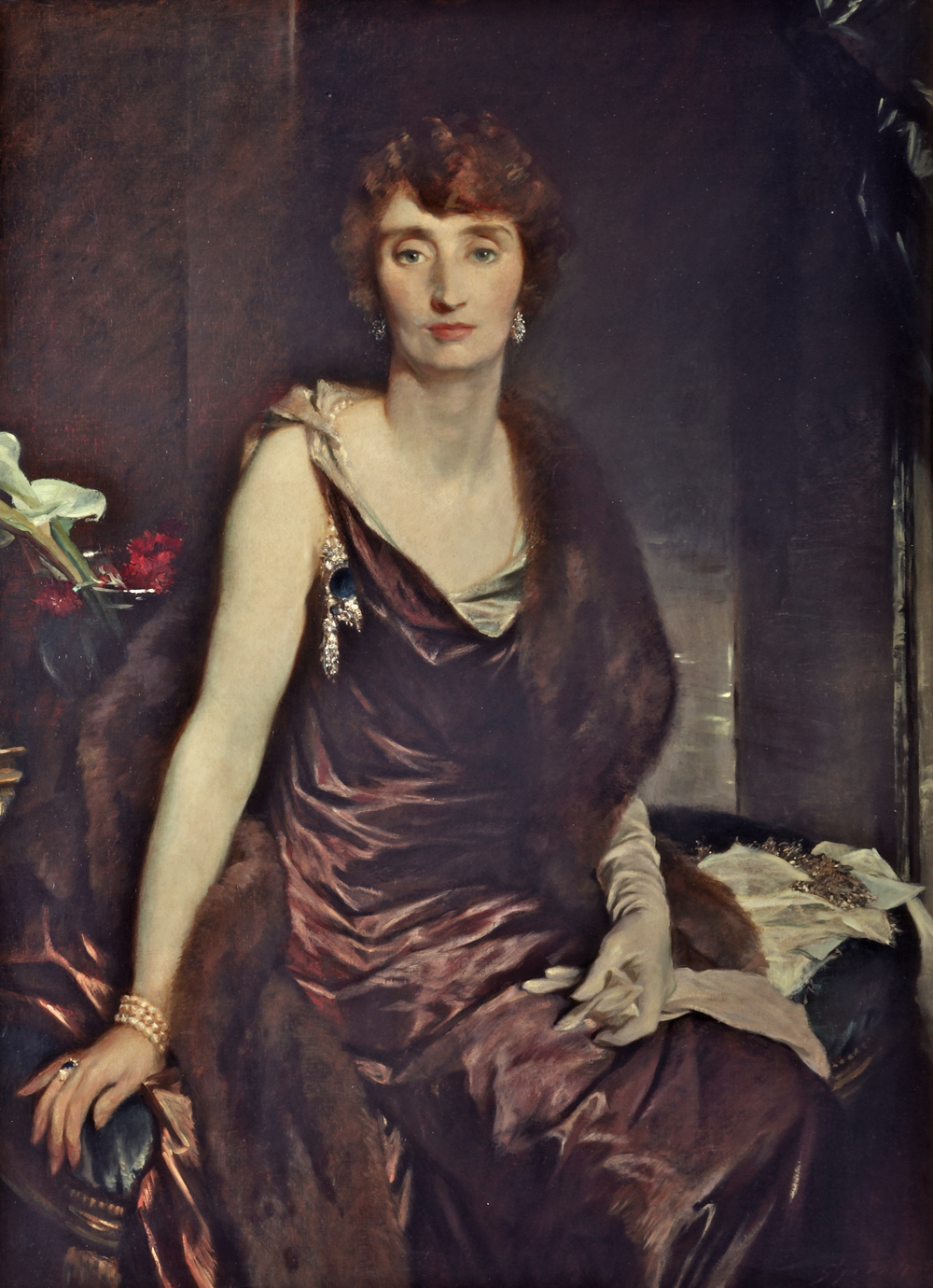
Irene Mountbatten, Marchioness of Carisbrooke, 1925, by Glyn Philpot

- McNaughton, Arnold (1973). The Book of Kings: A Royal Genealogy. Vol. 1. London: Garnstone Press. p. 155. ISBN 978-0-900391-19-4.
- Pine, L. G. (1972). The New Extinct Peerage, 1884-1971: Containing Extinct, Abeyant, Dormant & Suspended Peerages with Genealogies and Arms. London: Heraldry Today. p. 52. ISBN 978-0-900455-23-0. OCLC 628799.
- Cokayne, George E. (1940). Doubleday, H.A.; de Walden, Lord Howard (eds.). The Complete Peerage of England, Scotland, Ireland, Great Britain and the United Kingdom, Extant, Extinct and Dormant. Vol. XIII (2 ed.). London: St. Catherine Press. p. 262. LCCN 10020917. OCLC 1114291328.
