= Saint George's Memorial Church, Ypres =

Church building in Ypres, Belgium

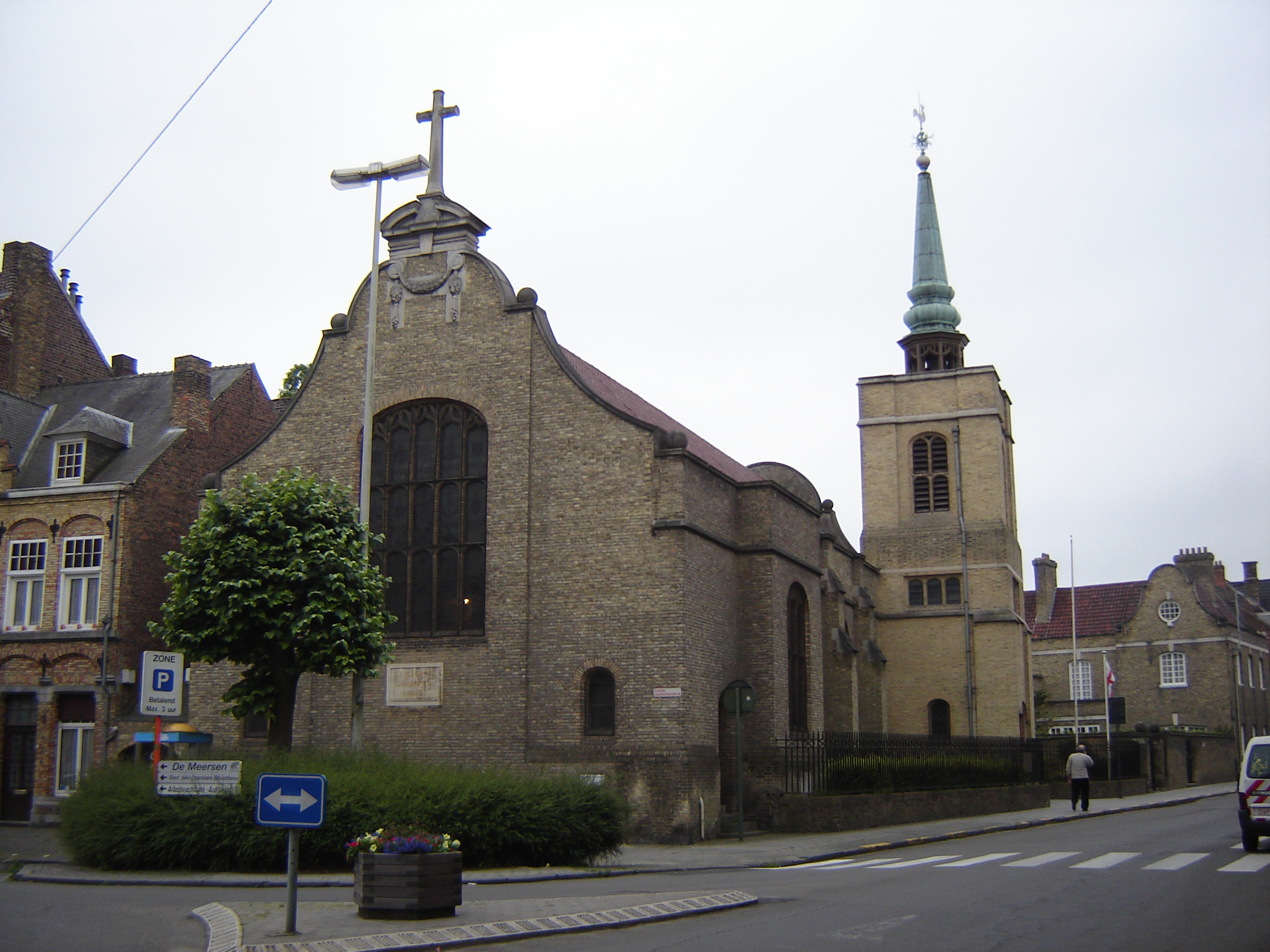
Saint George's Memorial Church in Ieper, West Flanders, Belgium

Saint George's Memorial Church, Ypres (Ieper), Belgium, was built to commemorate over 500,000 British and Commonwealth troops, who had died in the three battles fought for the Ypres Salient, during World War I. It was completed in 1929.

The church was built following an appeal led by The Ypres League and its President Field Marshal Sir John French, Earl of Ypres, for a British memorial church to be built. Land was given by the town, and the foundation stone was laid by Field Marshal Lord Plumer on 24 July 1927. The church was consecrated by the Bishop of Fulham on 24 March 1929. The architect was Sir Reginald Blomfield whose work included the Menin Gate (1922) and other war memorials.

The church is part of the Diocese in Europe of the Church of England and is also a Belgian national monument. The church is open every day from 8:30 am until 7 pm (6 pm in winter).

The church has many plaques and memorials to regiments, associations and individuals.

== Bells ==
In 2016, as part of the First World War centenary commemorations, a project to install a ring of bells was launched. The church was originally planned to include a ring, but there was insufficient funding available.

By September 2017, the church was able to pay for a new ring of change-ringing bells, cast by John Taylor & Co of Loughborough. They are the first of their kind in Belgium. In January 2018, the bell-ringing guild of Ypres was looking for people to perform on the eight new bells.

On 10 January 2018, a team of eight bell-ringers from the UK managed to score a peal of 5088 Ypres Surprise Major, in two hours and forty two minutes. It was the first full peal ever rung on church bells in continental Europe, and was also the first full peal on the bells.

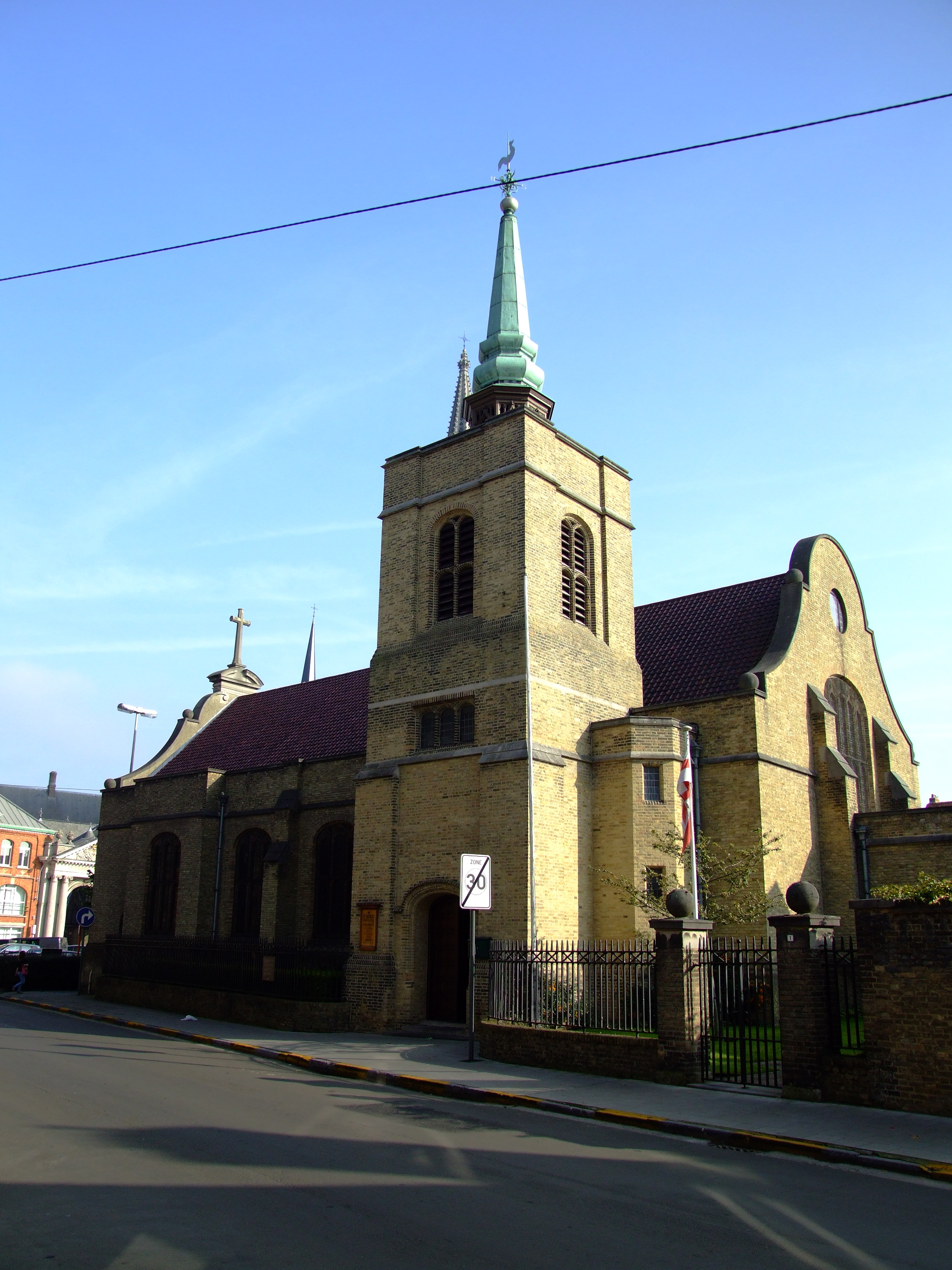

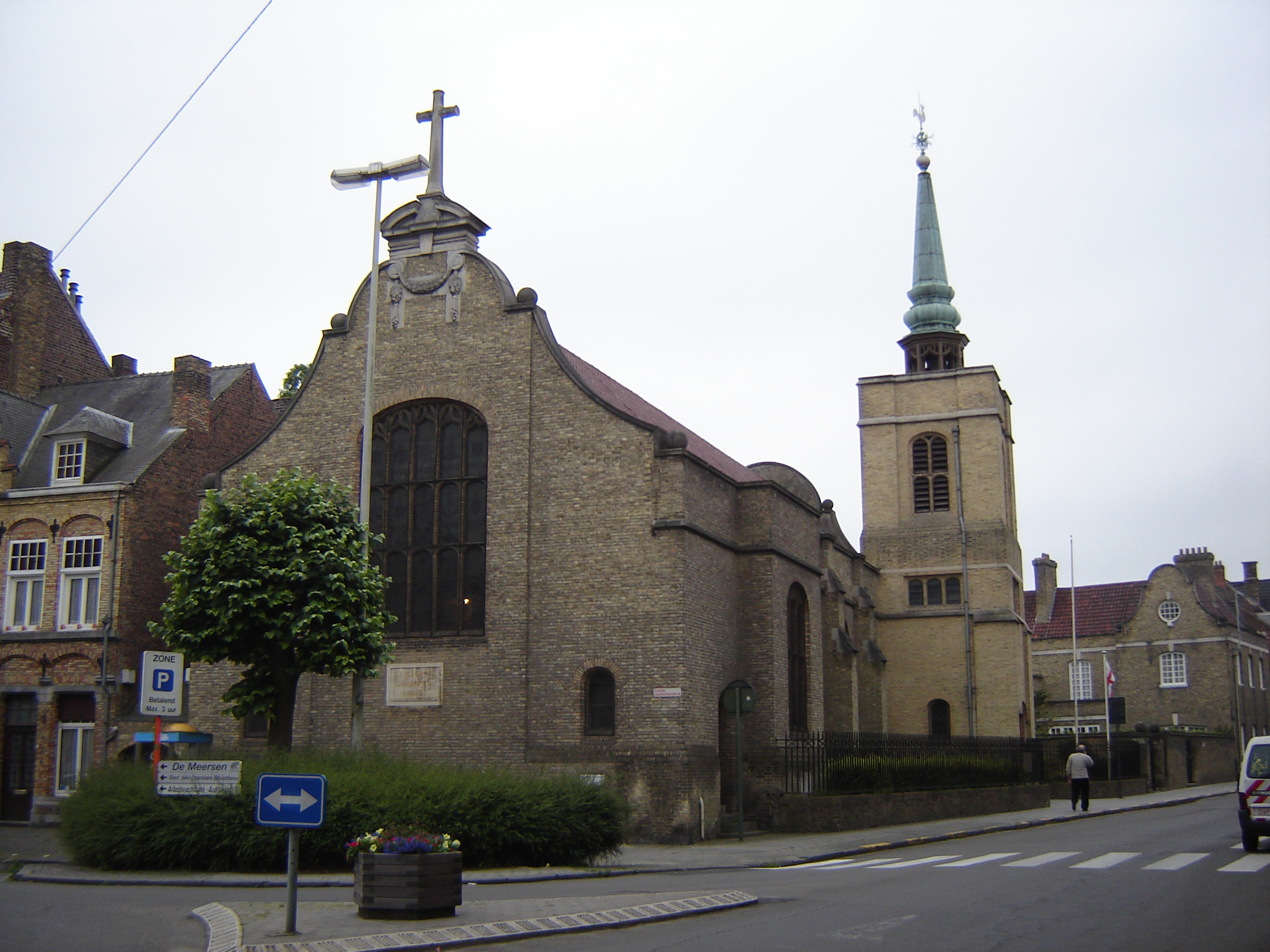

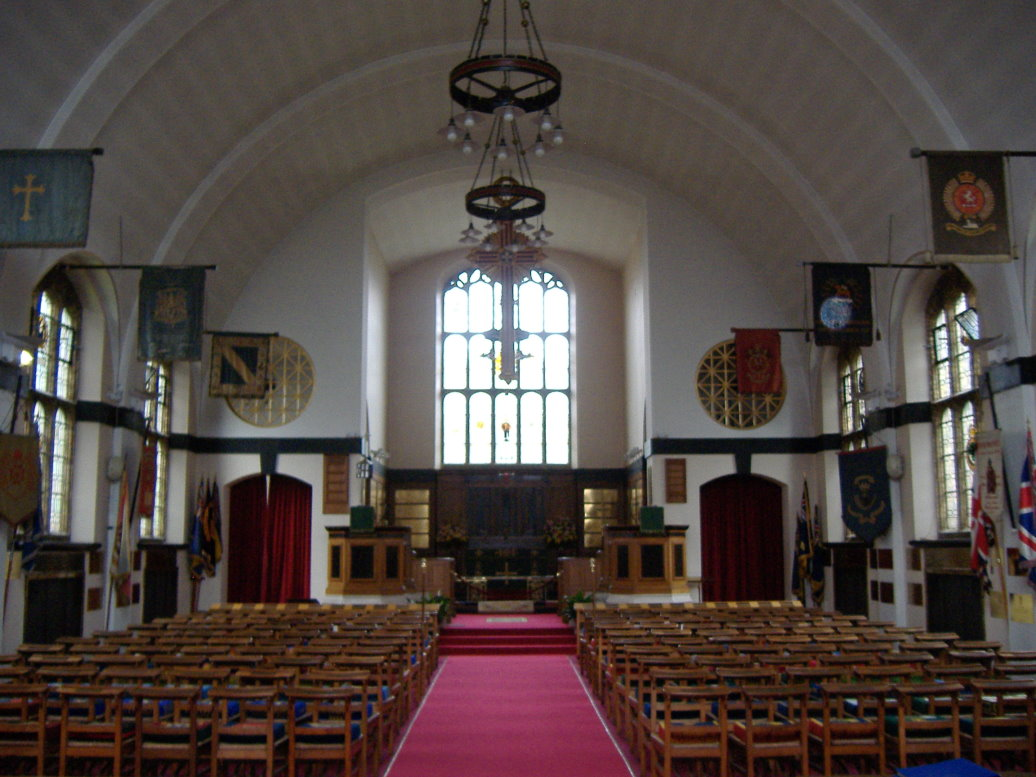

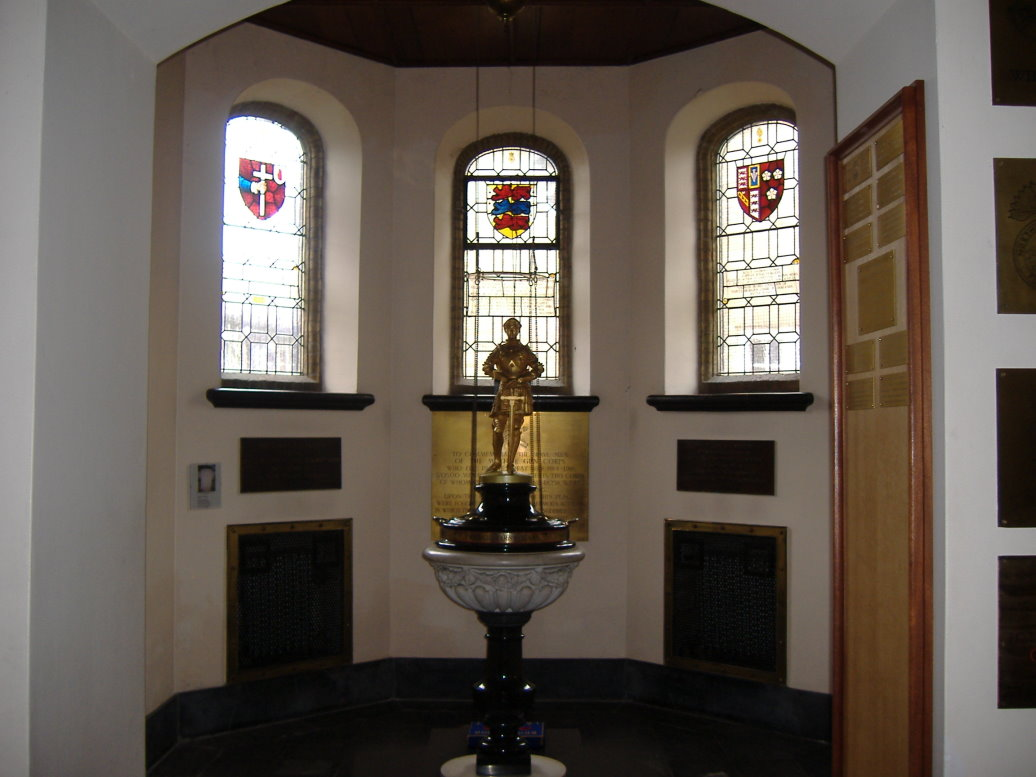

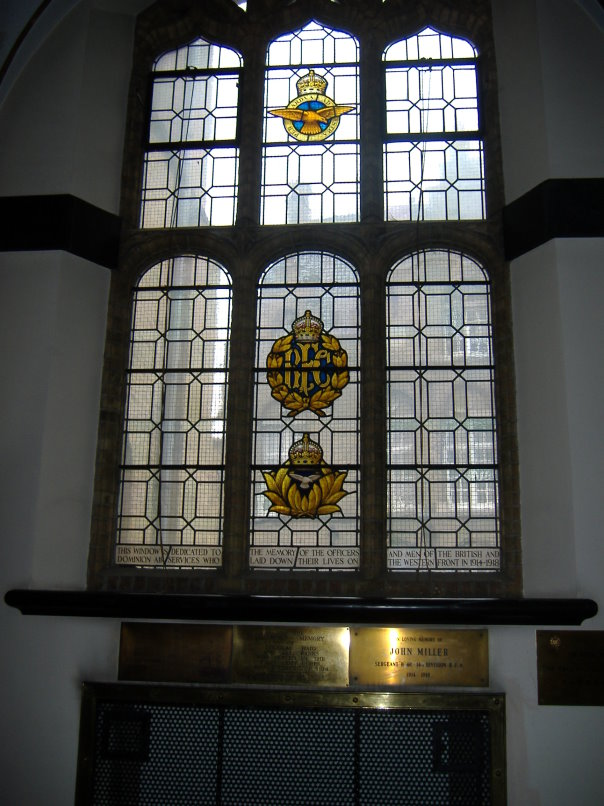

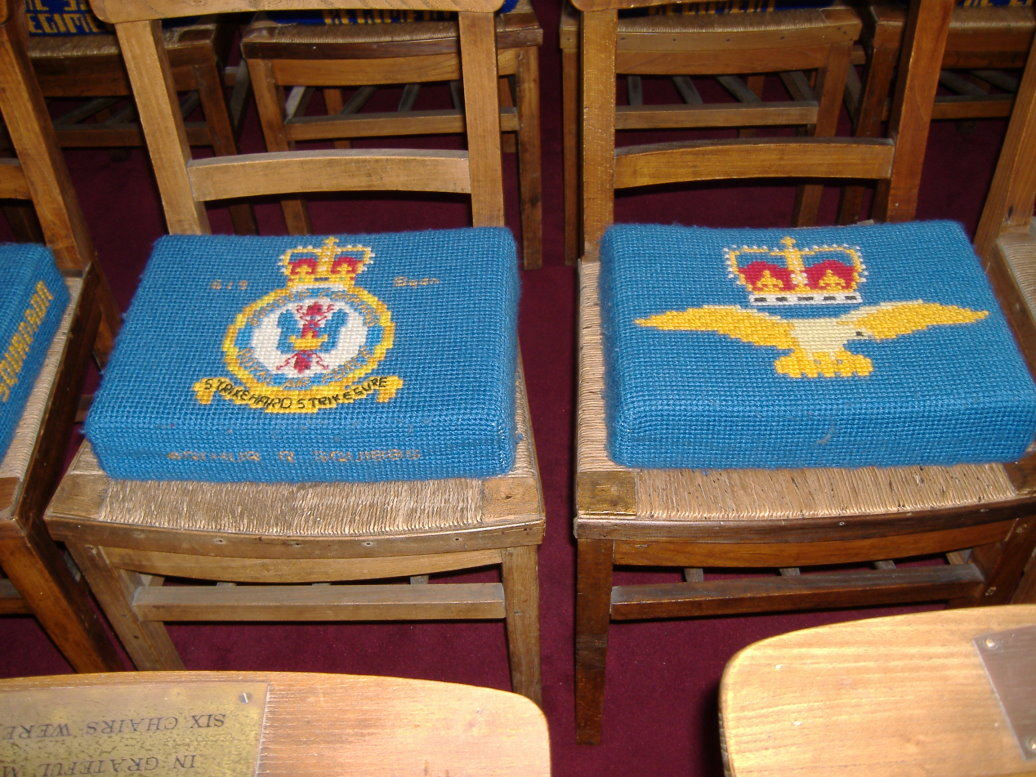

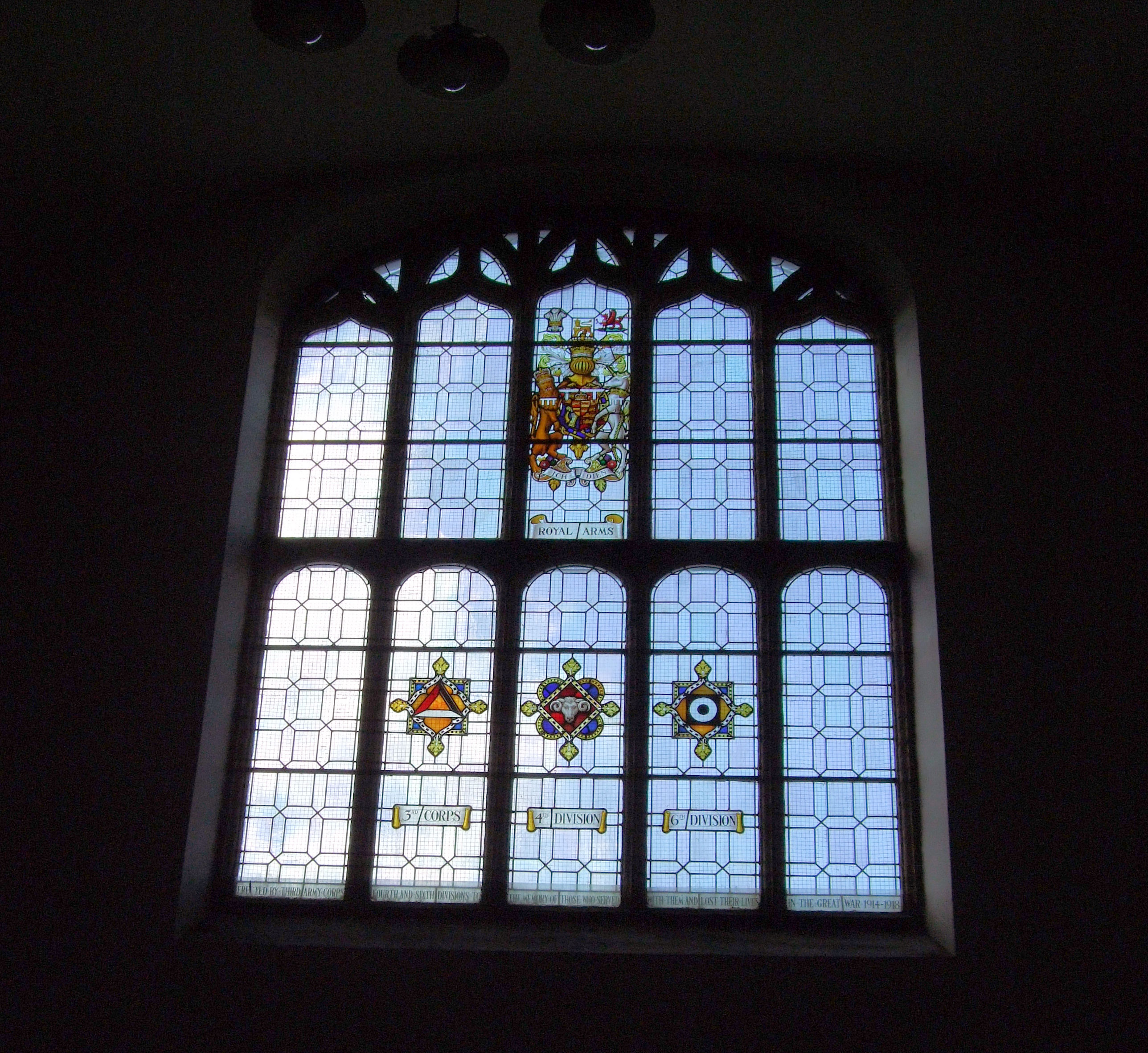

Location: 50.8523°N 2.8831°E

== See also ==
- List of churches under the patronage of Saint George
