= The Ypres League =

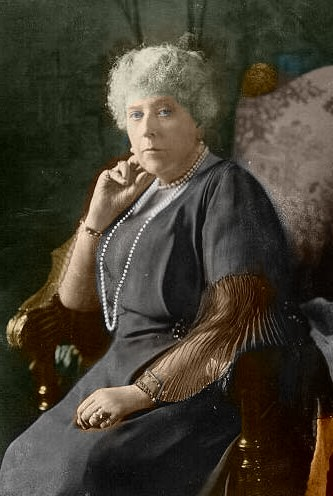
Princess Beatrice, a mother bereaved when her son was killed at Ypres, was a patron of the League

The Ypres League was a British World War I veterans and remembrance society. It was founded on 28 September 1920 to act as a brotherhood for veterans of the battles of the Ypres Salient, to remember those who died there, and to aid pilgrims traveling to the battlefields. It later became an incorporated society, based in London. It produced a quarterly newsletter and a guide book to Ypres, and provided a variety of services to its members, including specially designed membership certificates. It also worked to successfully erect a memorial church at Ypres. International branches were established, and the League celebrated its tenth anniversary in 1930. Publication of its newsletter continued well into the 1930s, and branches were still active in the 1940s.

== Founding members ==
The founder of the League was a Canadian Ypres veteran, Colonel Beckles Willson. By December 1920, King George V had agreed to become the League's patron. By 1925, there were three patrons: the King, Edward, Prince of Wales and Princess Beatrice. Beatrice, the youngest daughter of Queen Victoria, was herself a mother bereaved by the fighting at Ypres, as her son, Prince Maurice of Battenberg, had been killed in action in 1914 during the First Battle of Ypres.

The League's President, the Earl of Ypres, had been the first commander of the British Expeditionary Force during the war, and presided over one of the League's first committee meetings. Other officials of the League in 1925 included several who had been generals during the war: Earl Haig, Viscount Allenby, Lord Plumer, and Sir William Pulteney Pulteney. The committee also included Viscount Burnham as a representative of the Anglo-Belgian Union.

== Memorials and commemoration ==
Over a quarter of a million men from British and Dominion forces died in the Ypres battles, and one of the League's primary objectives was to establish a lasting memorial to those who fought in the area. In 1924 the League proposed the erection of a memorial church at Ypres. Fundraising by the League led to the building of Saint George's Memorial Church, Ypres, consecrated in 1929. Other memorials established or contributed to by the League included the Demarcation Stones, a line of 118 red granite pylons marking the line of the Western Front. The League paid for seven of these markers to be erected in the Ypres area. The League also held annual commemorations on 31 October, known as Ypres Day, a date chosen to mark the turning point in the First Battle of Ypres in 1914.

One of the early commemorations of Ypres Day, on 31 October 1921, saw a group of 800 pilgrims organised by the League travelling to Ypres. The tenth anniversary of the League was marked in 1930 by a parade that included Princess Beatrice laying a wreath at the Cenotaph. The wreath-laying at the Cenotaph by Princess Beatrice was repeated in 1935 to mark the League's 15th anniversary.

== Publications and services ==
The League's publications included a quarterly newsletter, The Ypres Times (first published in October 1921, and still being published as late as 1938), and books such as The Immortal Salient (1925), a historical record of the battles and a guide for pilgrims to Ypres. An account of the horror of the conditions on the Ypres Salient, written by the war correspondent Philip Gibbs, was used for the League's information leaflets. Planned publications included the Ypres Book of Valour. The League also had a marching song, called Tramping along to a little tin whistle and an old toy drum, a version of which was published in 1926.

Other services offered by the League included framed certificates of membership for veterans of the conflict and bereaved relatives of the dead. The scroll certificates, designed by Bernard Partridge, were intended as a memorial of honour. The League, together with the St Barnabas Society, also established and maintained a Pilgrimage Centre and rest room at Ypres, and raised funds to help bereaved and impoverished relatives of dead soldiers to visit Ypres and the surrounding battlefields. The League also worked with the Imperial War Graves Commission to compile registers of those buried or lost in the Salient, and to establish historical records and information for pilgrims and its members.

Membership of the League was offered on either a life or annual basis, with reduced and junior fees also available.

== International branches ==
In the early 1920s, the news of the founding of the League, and the intention to establish branches overseas, appeared in newspapers in Dominion countries whose forces had served in the Salient, including Australia, New Zealand and Canada. This led to the founding of several international branches of the League, but the US branch would not be established until a decade later. In March 1931, the League's representative in the USA presented the Ypres Medal to officers of the 27th Infantry Division that had participated at the Fourth Battle of Ypres. This was the first time the award had been presented to Americans, and the US branch of the League was launched a few days later at a dinner in New York that was attended by 500 people.
