= Princess Beatrice of the United Kingdom =

British princess (1857–1944)

Princess Beatrice
- Princess Henry of Battenberg
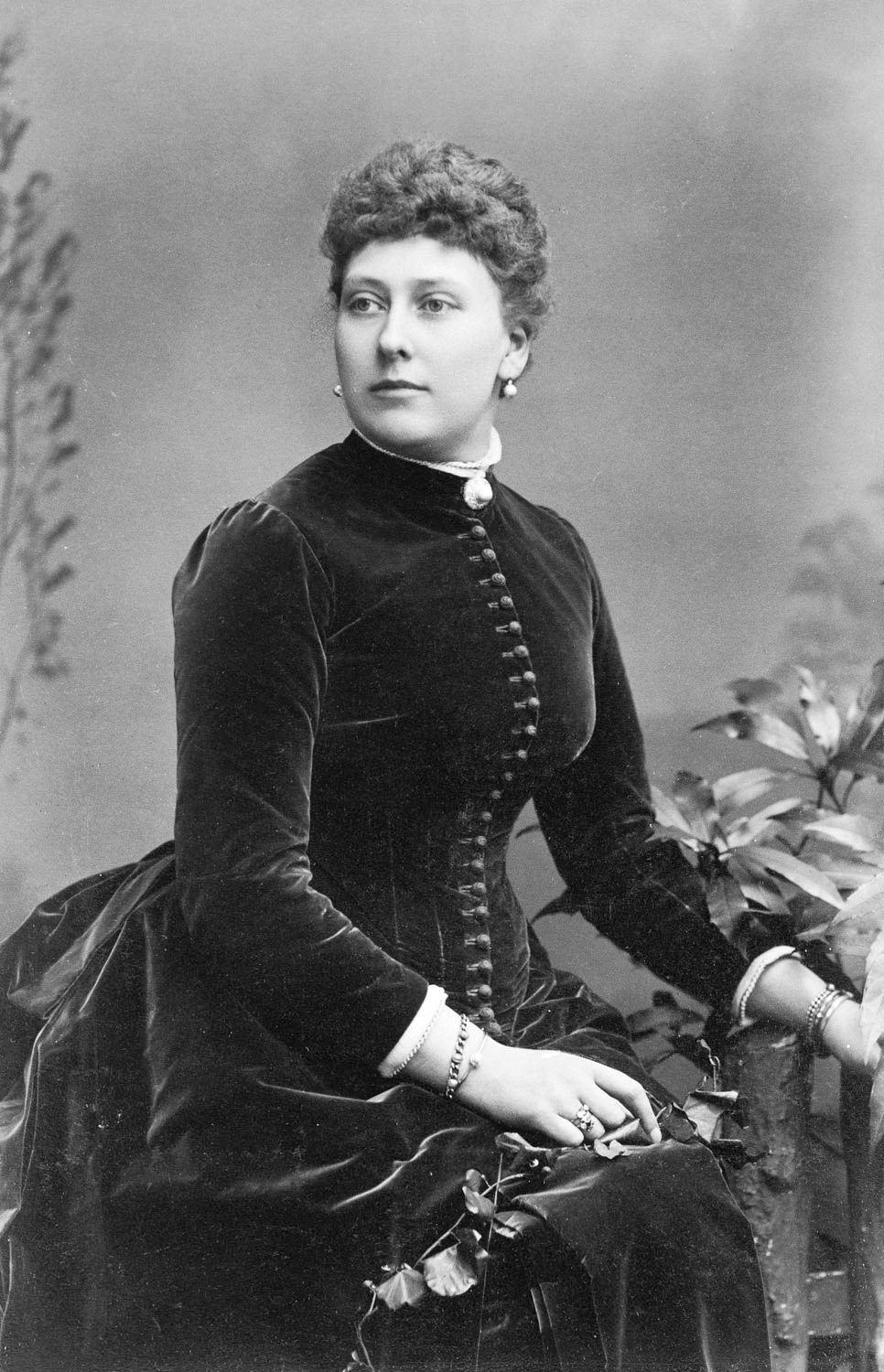
- Princess Beatrice in 1886
- Born: 14 April 1857; Buckingham Palace, London, England
- Died: 26 October 1944 (aged 87); Brantridge Park, Sussex, England
- Burial: 3 November 1944; St George's Chapel, Windsor; 27 August 1945; St. Mildred's Church, Whippingham
- Spouse: Prince Henry of Battenberg (m. 1885; died 1896)
- Issue: Alexander Mountbatten, 1st Marquess of Carisbrooke; Victoria Eugenie, Queen of Spain; Lord Leopold Mountbatten; Prince Maurice of Battenberg
Names
- Beatrice Mary Victoria Feodore
- House: Saxe-Coburg and Gotha (until 1917); Windsor (from 1917)
- Father: Prince Albert of Saxe-Coburg and Gotha
- Mother: Queen Victoria

Princess Beatrice (Beatrice Mary Victoria Feodore; 14 April 1857 – 26 October 1944), later known as Princess Henry of Battenberg, was the fifth daughter and youngest child of Queen Victoria and Prince Albert.

Beatrice's childhood was shaped by her mother's grief following the death of Prince Albert on 14 December 1861. As her elder sisters married and left the royal household, the Queen became increasingly dependent on the companionship of her youngest daughter, whom she affectionately called "Baby" well into adulthood. Beatrice was raised with the expectation that she would remain constantly at her mother's side, a role she gradually accepted as her duty.

Queen Victoria was opposed to Beatrice's marriage and initially refused even to discuss the prospect. Nevertheless, several potential suitors were considered, including Louis Napoléon, Prince Imperial, the only son of the exiled Emperor Napoleon III of France, and Louis IV, Grand Duke of Hesse, the widower of Beatrice's elder sister Alice. Beatrice was particularly drawn to the Prince Imperial, and a possible engagement was widely discussed, but his death during the Anglo-Zulu War in 1879 brought an end to those plans. Beatrice eventually fell in love with Prince Henry of Battenberg, the son of Prince Alexander of Hesse and by Rhine and Julia von Hauke, and the brother-in-law of her niece Princess Victoria of Hesse and by Rhine. After a year of sustained persuasion, Queen Victoria—whose approval was required under the Royal Marriages Act 1772—reluctantly consented to the union. The marriage took place on 23 July 1885 at Whippingham on the Isle of Wight, on the strict condition that the couple reside with the Queen and that Beatrice continue to serve as her mother's unofficial secretary.

Henry and Beatrice had four children. However, their marriage was cut short when he died of malaria on 20 January 1896 on active service during the Fourth Anglo-Ashanti War. Beatrice thereafter remained devoted to her mother, staying at her side until her death on 22 January 1901. In the decades that followed, Beatrice devoted herself to editing and preserving her mother's journals as the Queen's appointed literary executor, a task that occupied much of the final 30 years of her life. She continued to undertake public duties and make official appearances. Beatrice died in 1944 at the age of 87.

== Early life ==
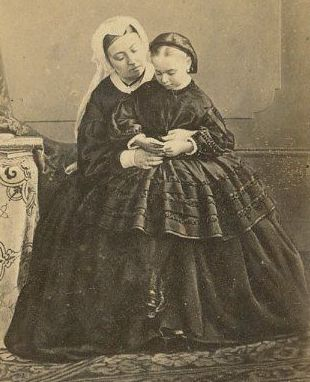
Queen Victoria holding Princess Beatrice in 1862

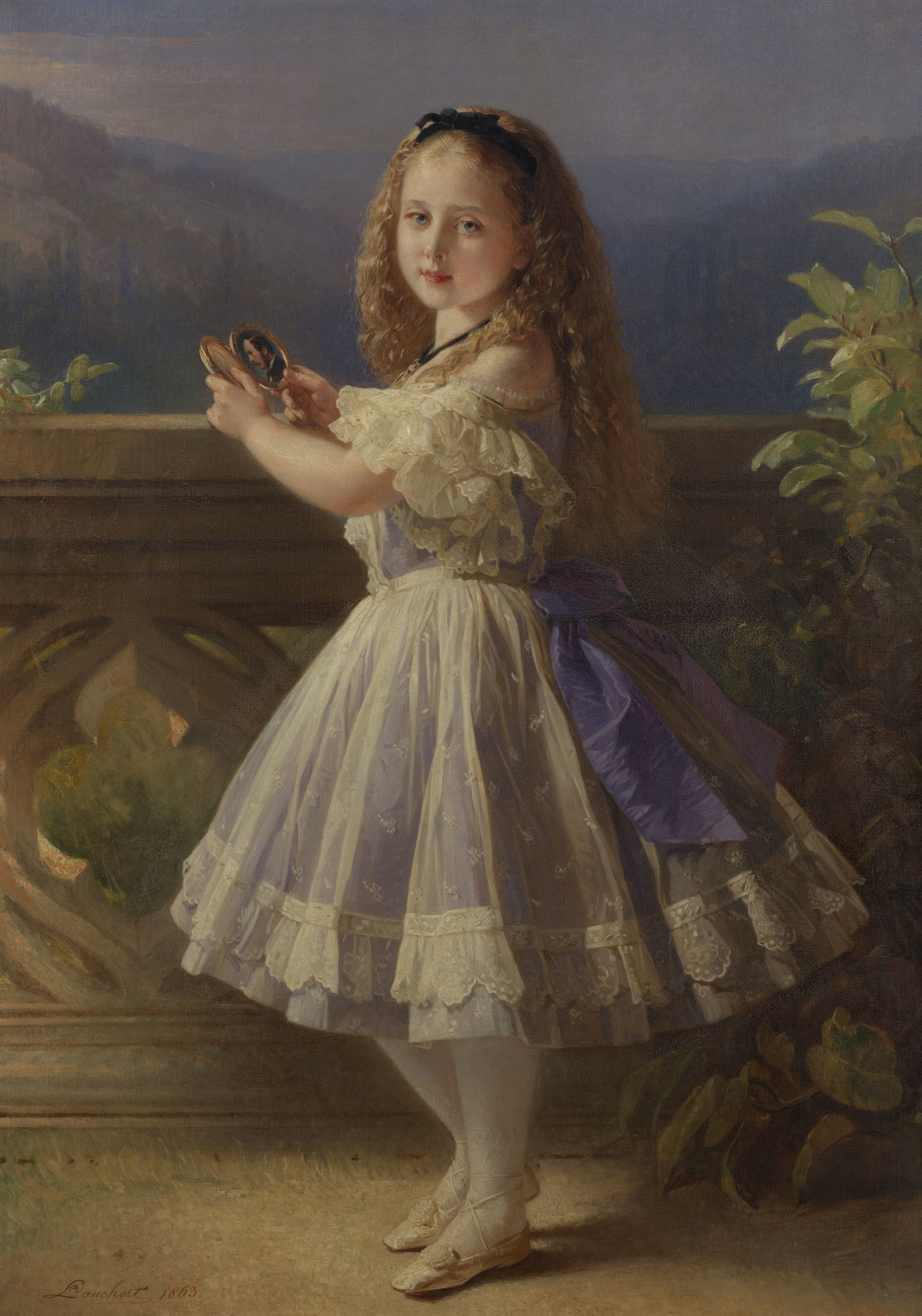
Princess Beatrice as a child, Richard Lauchert 1863

Beatrice was born at 1:45 pm on 14 April 1857 at Buckingham Palace, London. She was the fifth daughter and youngest of the nine children of the reigning British monarch, Queen Victoria, and her prince consort, Albert of Saxe-Coburg and Gotha. The birth caused controversy when it was announced that Queen Victoria would seek relief from the pains of delivery through the use of chloroform administered by Dr John Snow. Chloroform was considered dangerous to mother and child and was frowned upon by the Church of England and the medical authorities. Queen Victoria was undeterred and used "that blessed chloroform" for her last pregnancy. A fortnight later, she reported in her journal, "I was amply rewarded and forgot all I had gone through when I heard dearest Albert say 'It's a fine child, and a girl!'" Queen Victoria and Prince Albert chose the names Beatrice Mary Victoria Feodore: Mary after Princess Mary, Duchess of Gloucester, the Queen's aunt; Victoria after the Queen; and Feodore after Feodora, Princess of Hohenlohe-Langenburg, the Queen's older half-sister. The princess was baptised in the private chapel at Buckingham Palace on 16 June. Her godparents were her maternal grandmother, the Duchess of Kent; her eldest sister, the Princess Royal; and the Princess Royal's fiancé Prince Frederick of Prussia.

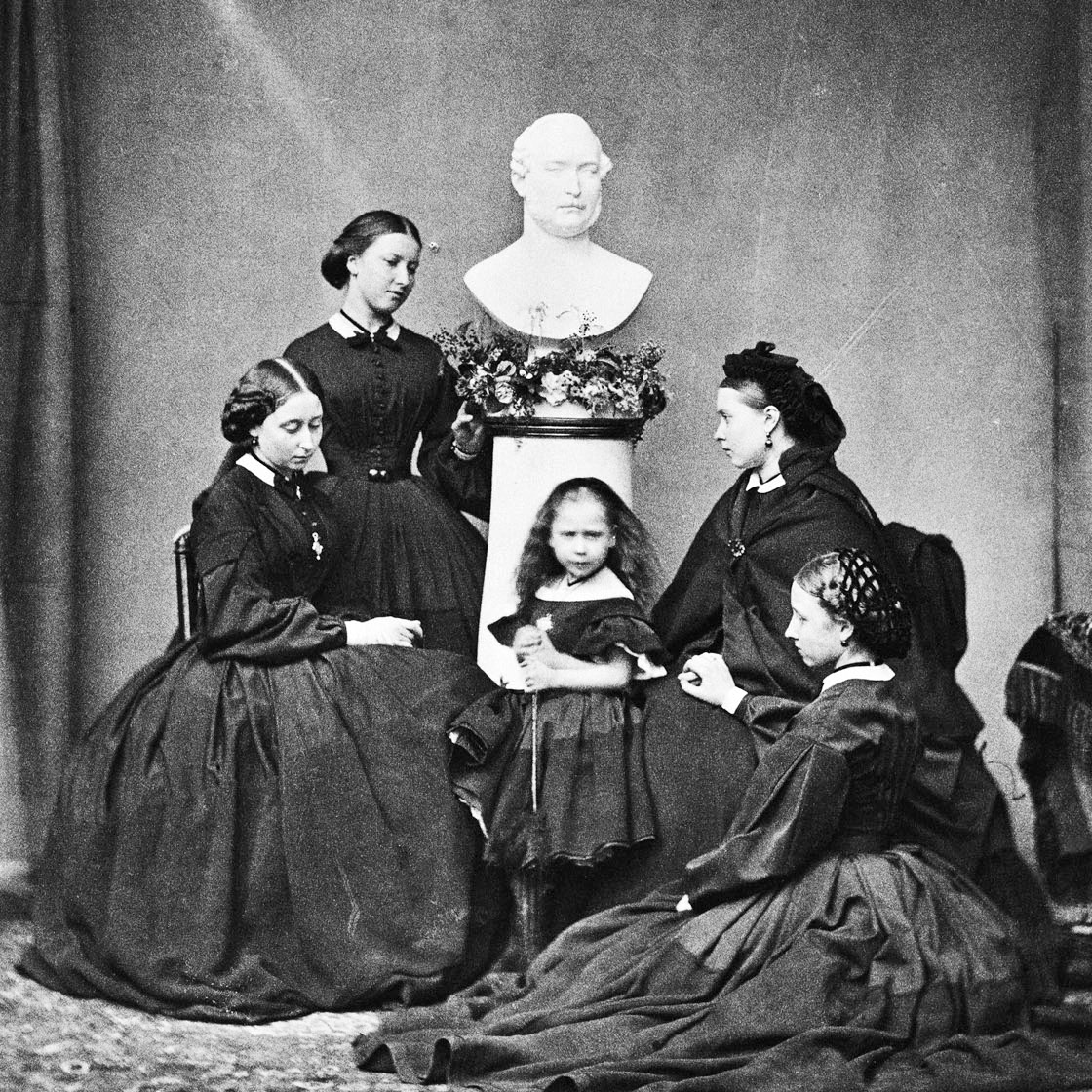
The daughters of Queen Victoria mourn the loss of their father in 1862. Beatrice is standing in the centre.

From birth, Beatrice became a favoured child. The elder favourite daughter of Prince Albert, the Princess Royal, was about to take up residence in Germany with her new husband, Frederick of Prussia. At the same time, the newly arrived Beatrice showed promise. Albert wrote to Augusta, Frederick's mother, that "Baby practises her scales like a good prima donna before a performance and has a good voice!" Although Queen Victoria was known to dislike most babies, she liked Beatrice, whom she considered attractive. This provided Beatrice with an advantage over her elder siblings. The Queen once remarked that Beatrice was "a pretty, plump and flourishing child ... with fine large blue eyes, [a] pretty little mouth and very fine skin". Her long, golden hair was the focus of paintings commissioned by Queen Victoria, who enjoyed giving Beatrice her bath, in marked contrast to her bathing preferences for her other children. Beatrice showed intelligence, which further endeared her to the Prince Consort, who was amused by her childhood precociousness.

The Prince Consort wrote to Baron Stockmar that Beatrice was "the most amusing baby we have had." Despite sharing the rigorous education programme designed by Prince Albert and Baron Stockmar, Beatrice had a more relaxed infancy than her siblings because of her relationship with her parents. By four years of age, the youngest, and the acknowledged last royal child, Beatrice was not forced to share her parents' attention the way her siblings had, and her amusing ways provided comfort to her faltering father.

== Queen Victoria's devoted companion ==
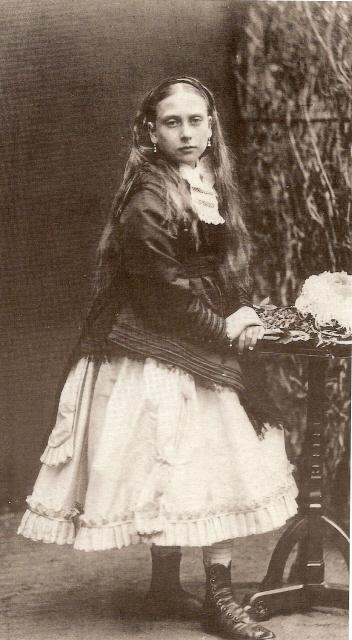
Princess Beatrice in 1868

In March 1861, Queen Victoria's mother Victoria, Duchess of Kent, died at Frogmore. The Queen broke down in grief and guilt over their estrangement at the beginning of her reign. Beatrice tried to console her mother by reminding her that her grandmother was "in heaven, but Beatrice hopes she will return". This comfort was significant because Queen Victoria had isolated herself from her children except Princesses Alice and Beatrice. Queen Victoria again relied on Beatrice and Alice after the death of Albert, of typhoid fever, on 14 December.

The depth of the Queen's grief over the death of her husband surprised her family, courtiers, politicians and general populace. As when her mother died, she shut herself off from her family—most particularly, the Prince of Wales (whom she blamed for her husband's death), with the exception of Alice and Beatrice. Queen Victoria often took Beatrice from her cot, hurried to her bed and "lay there sleepless, clasping to her child, wrapped in the nightclothes of a man who would wear them no more." After 1871, when the last of Beatrice's elder sisters married, Queen Victoria came to rely upon her youngest daughter, who had declared from an early age: "I don't like weddings at all. I shall never be married. I shall stay with my mother." As her mother's secretary, she performed duties such as writing on the Queen's behalf and helping with political correspondence. These mundane duties mirrored those that had been performed in succession by her sisters, Alice, Helena and Louise. However, to these the Queen soon added more personal tasks. During a serious illness in 1871, the Queen dictated her journal entries to Beatrice, and in 1876 she allowed Beatrice to sort the music she and the Prince Consort had played, unused since his death fifteen years earlier.

The devotion that Beatrice showed to her mother was acknowledged in the Queen's letters and journals, but her constant need for Beatrice grew stronger. The Queen suffered another bereavement in 1883, when her highland servant, John Brown, died at Balmoral. Once again, the Queen plunged into public mourning and relied on Beatrice for support. Unlike her siblings, Beatrice had not shown dislike for Brown, and the two had often been seen in each other's company; indeed, they had worked together to carry out the Queen's wishes.

== Marriage ==
=== Possible suitors ===
Although the Queen was set against Beatrice marrying anyone in the expectation that she would always stay at home with her, a number of possible suitors were put forward. One of these was Napoléon Eugéne, the French Prince Imperial, son and heir of the exiled Emperor Napoleon III of France and his wife, Empress Eugénie. After Prussia defeated France in the Franco-Prussian War, Napoleon was deposed and moved his family to England in 1870. After the Emperor's death in 1873, Queen Victoria and Empress Eugénie formed a close attachment, and the newspapers reported the imminent engagement of Beatrice to the Prince Imperial. These rumours ended with the death of the Prince Imperial in the Anglo-Zulu War on 1 June 1879. Queen Victoria's journal records their grief: "Dear Beatrice, crying very much as I did too, gave me the telegram ... It was dawning and little sleep did I get ... Beatrice is so distressed; everyone quite stunned."

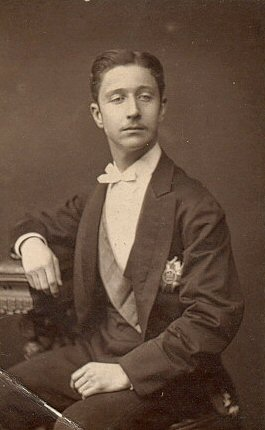
Louis Napoléon, Prince Imperial, to whom Beatrice was romantically attached in the 1870s

After the death of the Prince Imperial, the Prince of Wales suggested that Beatrice marry their sister Alice's widower, Louis IV, Grand Duke of Hesse. Alice had died in 1878, and the Prince argued that Beatrice could act as replacement mother for Louis's young children and spend most of her time in England looking after her mother. He further suggested the Queen could oversee the upbringing of her Hessian grandchildren with greater ease. However, at the time, it was forbidden by law for Beatrice to marry her sister's widower. This was countered by the Prince of Wales, who vehemently supported passage by the Houses of Parliament of the Deceased Wife's Sister Bill, which would have removed the obstacle. Despite popular support for this measure and although it passed in the House of Commons, it was rejected by the House of Lords because of opposition from the Lords Spiritual. Although the Queen was disappointed that the bill had failed, she was happy to keep her daughter at her side.

Other candidates, including the brothers Princes Alexander and Louis of Battenberg, were put forward to be Beatrice's husband, but they did not succeed. Although Alexander never formally pursued Beatrice, merely claiming that he "might even at one time have become engaged to the friend of my childhood, Beatrice of England", Louis was more interested. Queen Victoria invited him to dinner but sat between him and Beatrice, who had been told by the Queen to ignore Louis to discourage his suit. Louis, not realising for several years the reasons for this silence, married Beatrice's niece Princess Victoria of Hesse and by Rhine. Although her marriage hopes had been dealt another blow, while attending Louis's wedding at Darmstadt, Beatrice fell in love with Louis and Alexander's brother Prince Henry, who returned her affections.

=== Engagement and wedding ===
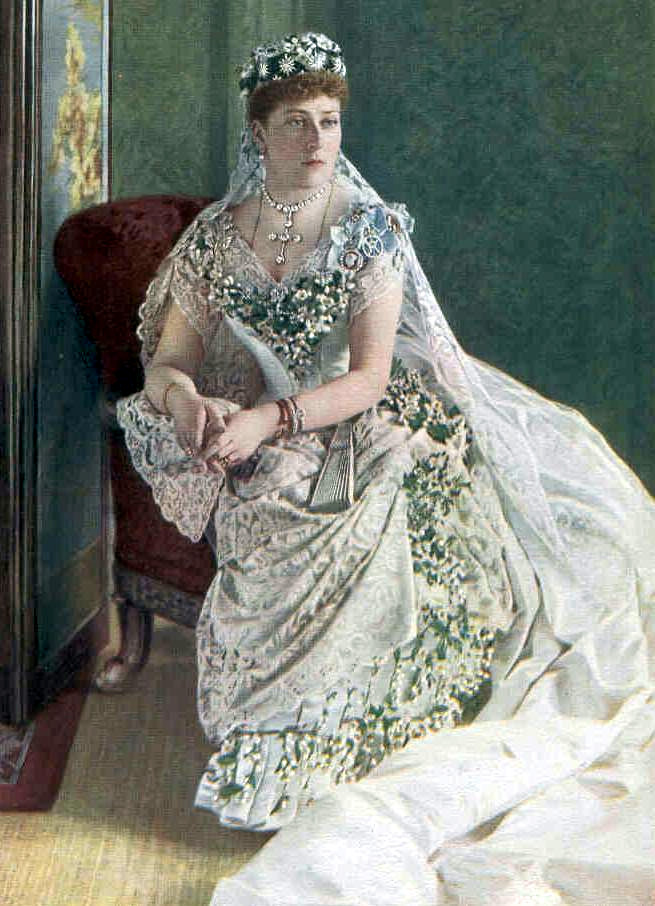
Princess Beatrice in her wedding dress, Osborne, 1885. Beatrice wore her mother's wedding veil of Honiton lace.

When Beatrice, after returning from Darmstadt, told her mother she planned to marry, the Queen reacted with frightening silence. Although they remained side by side, the Queen did not talk to her for seven months, instead communicating by note. Queen Victoria's behaviour, unexpected even by her family, seemed prompted by the threatened loss of her daughter. The Queen regarded Beatrice as her "Baby" – her innocent child – and viewed the physical sex that would come with marriage as an end to innocence.

Subtle persuasions by the Princess of Wales and the Crown Princess of Prussia, who reminded her mother of the happiness that Beatrice had brought the Prince Consort, induced the Queen to resume talking to Beatrice. Queen Victoria consented to the marriage on condition that Henry give up his German commitments and live permanently with Beatrice and the Queen.

Beatrice and Henry were married at Saint Mildred's Church at Whippingham, near Osborne, on 23 July 1885. Beatrice, who wore her mother's wedding veil of Honiton lace, was escorted by the Queen and Beatrice's eldest brother, the Prince of Wales. Princess Beatrice was attended by ten royal bridesmaids from among her nieces: Princesses Louise (18), Victoria and Maud of Wales; Princesses Irene and Alix of Hesse and by Rhine; Princesses Marie, Victoria Melita and Alexandra of Edinburgh; and Princesses Helena Victoria and Marie Louise of Schleswig-Holstein. The bridegroom's supporters were his brothers, Prince Alexander of Bulgaria and Prince Francis Joseph of Battenberg.

The ceremony – which was not attended by her eldest sister and brother-in-law, the Crown Prince and Princess of Prussia, who were detained in Germany; William Ewart Gladstone; or Beatrice's cousin, Princess Mary Adelaide, Duchess of Teck, who was in mourning for her father-in-law – ended with the couple's departure for their honeymoon at Quarr Abbey House, a few miles from Osborne. The Queen, taking leave of them, "bore up bravely till the departure and then fairly gave way", as she later admitted to the Crown Princess.

== Queen Victoria's last years ==
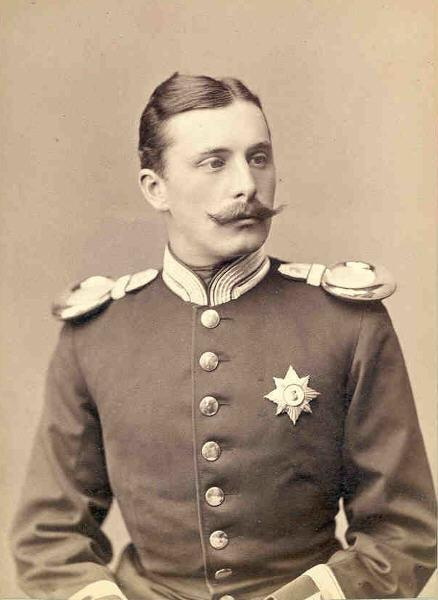
Prince Henry of Battenberg, who was married to Beatrice from 1885 until his death in 1896

After a short honeymoon, Beatrice and her husband fulfilled their promise and returned to the Queen's side. The Queen made it clear that she could not cope on her own and that the couple could not travel without her. Although the Queen relaxed this restriction shortly after the marriage, Beatrice and Henry travelled only to make short visits with his family. Beatrice's love for Henry, like that of the Queen's for the Prince Consort, seemed to increase the longer they were married. When Henry travelled without Beatrice, she appeared happier when he returned.

The addition of Prince Henry to the family gave new reasons for Beatrice and the Queen to look forward, and the court was brighter than it had been since the Prince Consort's death. Even so, Henry, supported by Beatrice, was determined to take part in military campaigns, and this annoyed the Queen, who opposed his participation in life-threatening warfare. Conflicts also arose when Henry attended the Ajaccio carnival and kept "low company", and Beatrice sent a Royal Navy officer to remove him from temptation. On one occasion, Henry slipped away to Corsica with his brother Louis; the Queen sent a warship to bring him back. Henry was feeling oppressed by the Queen's constant need for his and his wife's company.

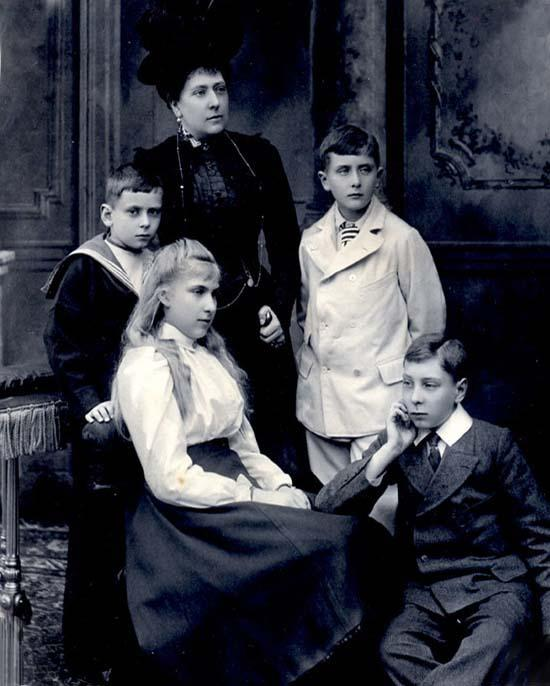
Princess Beatrice with her children, 1900

Despite being married, Beatrice fulfilled her promise to the Queen by continuing as her full-time confidante and secretary. Queen Victoria warmed to Henry. However, the Queen criticised Beatrice's conduct during her first pregnancy. When Beatrice stopped coming to the Queen's dinners a week before giving birth, preferring to eat alone in her room, the Queen wrote angrily to her physician, Dr James Reid, that, "I [urged the Princess to continue] coming to dinner, and not simply moping in her own room, which is very bad for her. In my case I regularly came to dinner, except when I was really unwell (even when suffering a great deal) up to the very last day." Beatrice, aided by chloroform, gave birth the following week to her first son, Alexander. Despite suffering a miscarriage in the early months of her marriage, Beatrice gave birth to four children: Alexander, called "Drino", was born in 1886; Victoria Eugenie, called "Ena", in 1887; Leopold in 1889; and Maurice in 1891. Following this, she took a polite and encouraging interest in social issues.

Although court entertainments were few after the Prince Consort's death, Beatrice and the Queen enjoyed tableau vivant photography, which was often performed at the royal residences. Henry, increasingly bored by the lack of activity at court, longed for employment, and in response, the Queen made him Governor of the Isle of Wight in 1889. However, he yearned for military adventure and pleaded with his mother-in-law to let him join the Ashanti expedition fighting in the Anglo-Asante war. Despite misgivings, the Queen consented, and Henry and Beatrice parted on 6 December 1895; they would not meet again. Henry contracted malaria and was sent home. On 22 January 1896, Beatrice, who was waiting for her husband at Madeira, received a telegram informing her of Henry's death two days earlier.

Devastated, she left court for a month of mourning before returning to her post at her mother's side. The Queen's journal reports that Queen Victoria "[w]ent over to Beatrice's room and sat a while with her. She is so piteous in her misery." Despite her grief, Beatrice remained her mother's faithful companion, and as Queen Victoria aged, she relied more heavily on Beatrice for dealing with correspondence. However, realising that Beatrice needed a place of her own, she gave her the Kensington Palace apartments once occupied by the Queen and her mother. The Queen appointed Beatrice to the governorship of the Isle of Wight, vacated by Prince Henry's death. In response to Beatrice's interest in photography, the Queen had a darkroom installed at Osborne House. The changes in the family, including Beatrice's preoccupation with her mother, may have affected her children, who rebelled at school. Beatrice wrote that Ena was "troublesome and rebellious", and that Alexander was telling "unwarrantable untruths".

== Later life ==
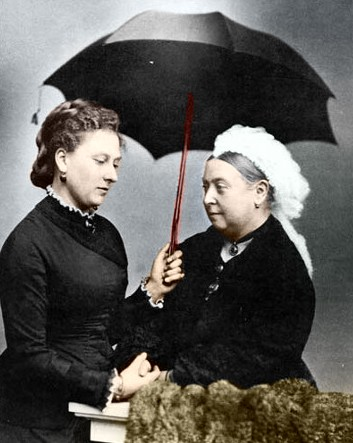
Princess Beatrice with her mother, Queen Victoria

Beatrice's life was overturned by the death of Queen Victoria on 22 January 1901. She wrote to the Principal of the University of Glasgow in March, "... you may imagine what the grief is. I, who had hardly ever been separated from my dear mother, can hardly realise what life will be like without her, who was the centre of everything." Beatrice's public appearances continued, but her position at court was diminished. She, unlike her sister Louise, was not close to her brother, now Edward VII, and was not included in the King's inner circle. Although their relationship did not break down completely, it was occasionally strained, for example when she accidentally (but noisily) dropped her service book from the royal gallery onto a table of gold plate during his coronation.

After inheriting Osborne, the King had his mother's personal photographs and belongings removed and some of them destroyed, especially material relating to John Brown, whom he detested. Queen Victoria had intended the house to be a private, secluded residence for her descendants, away from the pomp and ceremony of mainland life. However, the new king had no need for the house and consulted his lawyers about disposing of it, transforming the main wing into a convalescent home, opening the state apartments to the public, and constructing a Naval College on the grounds. His plans met with strong disapproval from Beatrice and Louise. Queen Victoria had bequeathed them houses on the estate, and the privacy promised to them by their mother was threatened. When Edward discussed the fate of the house with them, Beatrice argued against allowing the house to leave the family, citing its importance to their parents.

However, the King did not want the house himself, and he offered it to his heir-apparent, Beatrice's nephew George, who declined, objecting to the high cost of maintenance. Edward subsequently extended the grounds of Beatrice's home, Osborne Cottage, to compensate her for the impending loss of her privacy. Shortly afterwards, the King declared to Arthur Balfour, the prime minister, that the main house would go to the nation as a gift. An exception was made for the private apartments, which were closed to all but the royal family members, who made it a shrine to their mother's memory.

=== Queen Victoria's journals ===
Upon Queen Victoria's death, Beatrice began the momentous task of transcribing and editing her mother's journals. The hundreds of volumes from 1831 onwards contained the Queen's personal views of the day-to-day business of her life and included personal and family matters as well as matters of state.

Queen Victoria had given Beatrice the task of editing the journals for publication, which meant removing private material as well as passages that, if published, might be hurtful to living people. Beatrice deleted so much material that the edited journals are only a third as long as the originals. The destruction of such large passages of Queen Victoria's diaries distressed Beatrice's nephew, George V, and his wife Queen Mary, who were powerless to intervene. Beatrice copied a draft from the original and then copied her draft into a set of blue notebooks. Both the originals and her first drafts were destroyed as she progressed. The task took thirty years and was finished in 1931. The surviving 111 notebooks are kept in the Royal Archives at Windsor Castle.

=== Retirement from public life ===
Beatrice continued to appear in public after her mother's death. The public engagements she carried out were often related to her mother, Queen Victoria, as the public had always associated Beatrice with the deceased monarch.

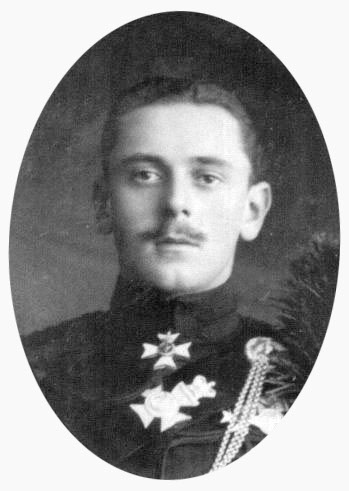
Prince Maurice of Battenberg. After his death during the First World War, Beatrice began to retire from public life.

The beauty of Beatrice's daughter, Ena, was known throughout Europe, and, despite her low rank, she was a desirable bride. Her chosen suitor was Alfonso XIII of Spain. However, the marriage caused controversy in Britain, since it required Ena to convert to Catholicism. This step was opposed by Beatrice's brother, Edward VII, and Spanish ultra-conservatives were against the King's marriage to a Protestant of low birth, as her father, Prince Henry, was the son of a morganatic marriage. Thus, they considered Ena to be only partly royal and thus unfit to be Queen of Spain. Nonetheless, the couple wed on 31 May 1906. The marriage began inauspiciously when an anarchist attempted to bomb them on their wedding day. Apparently close at first, the couple grew apart. Ena became unpopular in Spain and grew more so when it was discovered that her son, the heir-apparent to the throne, suffered from haemophilia. Alfonso held Beatrice responsible for having brought the disease to the Spanish royal house and turned bitterly against Ena.

During her time as Queen of Spain, Ena returned many times to visit her mother in Britain, but always without Alfonso and usually without her children. Meanwhile, Beatrice lived at Osborne Cottage in East Cowes until she sold it in 1913, when Carisbrooke Castle, home of the Governor of the Isle of Wight, became vacant. She moved into the Castle while keeping an apartment at Kensington Palace in London. She had been much involved in collecting material for the Carisbrooke Castle museum, which she opened in 1898.

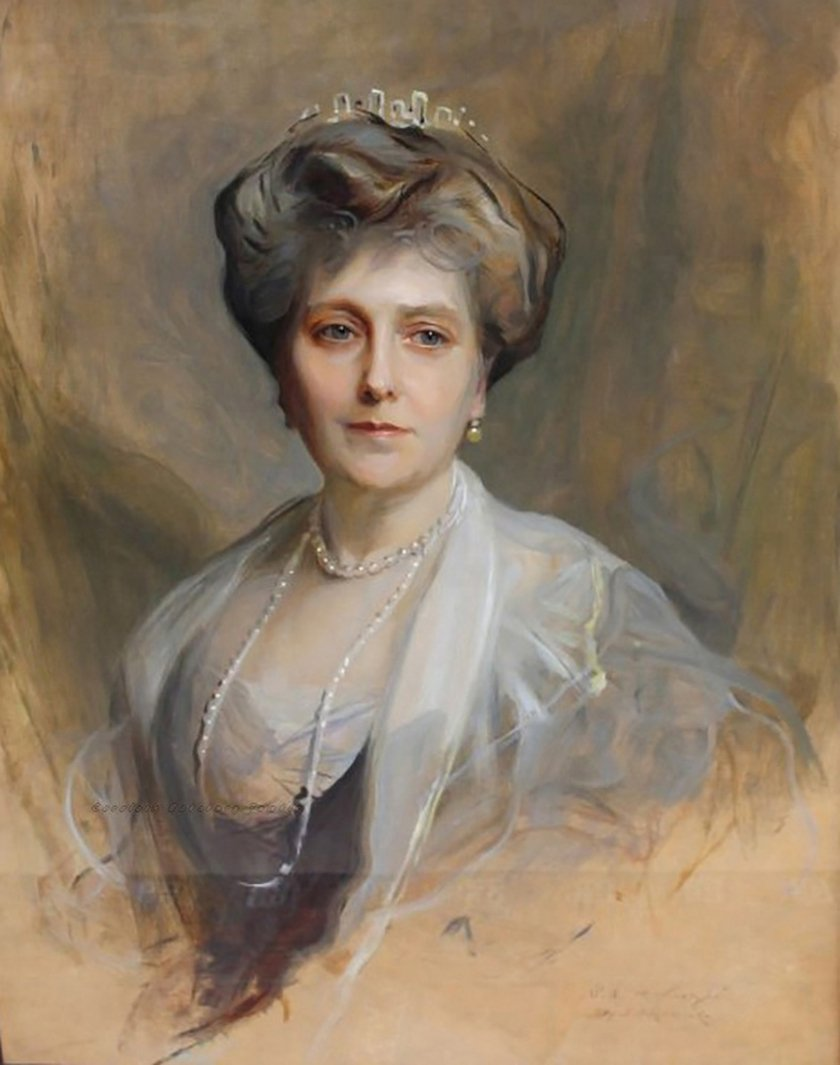
Portrait by Philip de László, 1912

Her presence at court further decreased as she aged. Devastated by the death of her favourite son, Maurice, during the First World War in 1914, she began to retire from public life. In response to war with Germany, George V changed the name of the royal house from Saxe-Coburg and Gotha to Windsor and at the same time adopted it as the family surname, to downplay their German origins. Subsequently, Beatrice and her family renounced their German titles; Beatrice stopped using the style Princess Henry of Battenberg, reverting to only using her birth style, HRH The Princess Beatrice. Her sons gave up their style, Prince of Battenberg. Alexander, the eldest, became Sir Alexander Mountbatten and was later given the title Marquess of Carisbrooke in the Peerage of the United Kingdom. Her younger son, Leopold, became Lord Leopold Mountbatten and was given the rank of a younger son of a marquess. He was a haemophiliac, having inherited the "royal disease" from his mother, and died during a knee operation in 1922 one month short of his 33rd birthday.

Following the war, Beatrice was one of several members of the royal family who became patrons of The Ypres League, a society founded for veterans of the Ypres Salient and bereaved relatives of those killed in fighting in the Salient. She was herself a bereaved mother, as her son, Prince Maurice of Battenberg, had been killed in action during the First Battle of Ypres. Rare public appearances after his death included commemorations, including laying wreaths at the Cenotaph in 1930 and 1935 to mark the 10th and 15th anniversaries of the founding of the League.

=== Last years and death ===
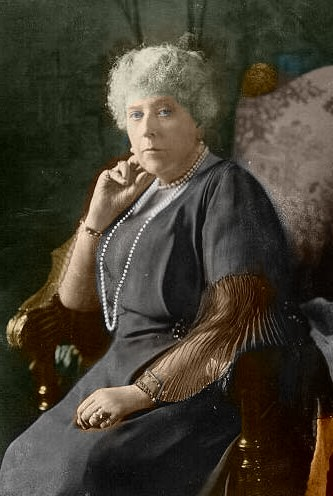
Princess Beatrice in later life

Even in her seventies, Beatrice continued to correspond with her friends and relatives and to make rare public appearances, such as when, pushed in a wheelchair, she viewed the wreaths laid after the death of her nephew George V in 1936. She published her last work of translation in 1941. Entitled "In Napoleonic Days", it was the personal diary of Queen Victoria's maternal grandmother, Augusta, Duchess of Saxe-Coburg-Saalfeld. She corresponded with the publisher, John Murray, who greatly approved of the work. She made her last home at Brantridge Park in West Sussex, which was owned by Queen Mary's brother, Alexander Cambridge, 1st Earl of Athlone, and his wife, Princess Alice, who was Beatrice's niece; the Athlones were at the time in Canada where the Earl was governor-general. There, Beatrice died in her sleep on 26 October 1944, aged 87 (the day before the 30th anniversary of her son, Prince Maurice's death). After her funeral service at St George's Chapel, Windsor Castle, her coffin was interred in the royal vault on 3 November. On 27 August 1945, her body was transferred and interred in a joint tomb alongside her husband in St Mildred's Church, Whippingham. Beatrice's final wish, to be buried with her husband on the island most familiar to her, was fulfilled in a private service at Whippingham attended only by her son, the Marquess of Carisbrooke, and his wife.

== Legacy ==
Beatrice was the shyest of all of Queen Victoria's children. However, because she accompanied Queen Victoria almost wherever she went, she became among the best known. Despite her shyness, she was an able actress and dancer as well as a keen artist and photographer. She was devoted to her children and was concerned when they misbehaved at school. To those who enjoyed her friendship, she was loyal and had a sense of humour, and as a public figure she was driven by a strong sense of duty. She was Patron of the Isle of Wight Branch of the Royal National Lifeboat Institution from 1920 until her death. Music, a passion that was shared by her mother and the Prince Consort, was something in which Beatrice excelled. She played the piano to professional standards and was an occasional composer. Like her mother, she was a devout Christian, fascinated by theology until her death. With her calm temperament and personal warmth, the princess won wide approval.

The demands made on Beatrice during her mother's reign were high. Despite suffering from rheumatism, Beatrice was forced to endure her mother's love of cold weather. Beatrice's piano playing suffered as her rheumatism got gradually worse, eliminating an enjoyment in which she excelled; however, this did not change her willingness to cater to her mother's needs. Her effort did not go unnoticed by the British public.

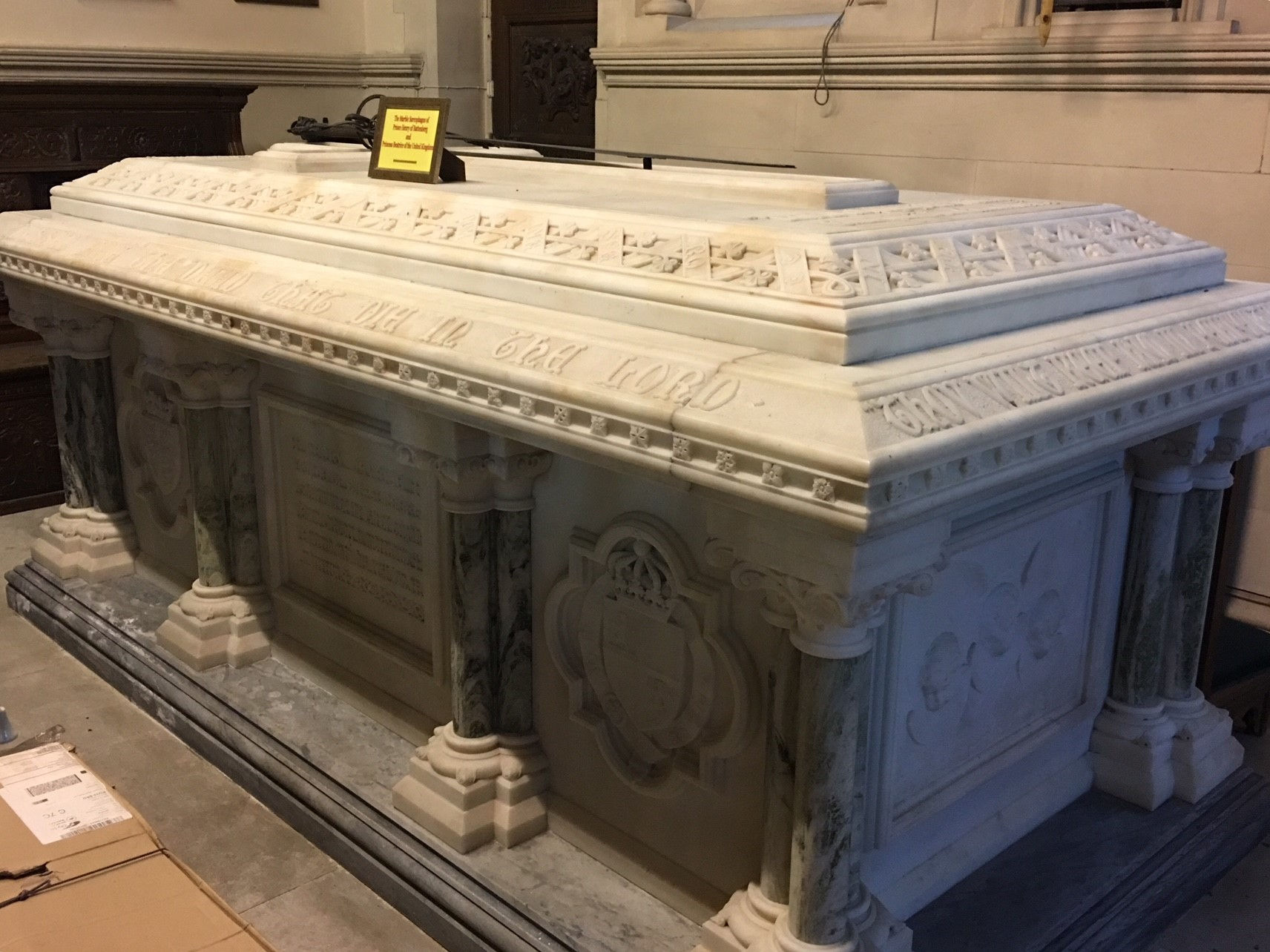
Tomb of Prince Henry of Battenberg and Princess Beatrice of the United Kingdom in St Mildred's Church, Whippingham, Isle of Wight

In 1886, when she agreed to open the Show of the Royal Horticultural Society of Southampton, the organisers sent her a proclamation of thanks, expressing their "admiration of the affectionate manner in which you have comforted and assisted your widowed mother our Gracious Sovereign the Queen". As a wedding present, Sir Moses Montefiore, a banker and philanthropist, presented Beatrice and Henry with a silver tea service inscribed: "Many daughters have acted virtuously, but thou excellest them all." The Times newspaper, shortly before Beatrice's marriage, wrote: "The devotion of your Royal Highness to our beloved Sovereign has won our warmest admiration and our deepest gratitude. May those blessings which it has hitherto been your constant aim to confer on others now be returned in full measure to yourself." The sentence was, as far as it dared, criticising the Queen's hold over her daughter.

She died at Brantridge Park, the home of her niece, Princess Alice, and her husband, the Earl of Athlone, at the time serving as Governor General of Canada. Osborne House, her mother's favourite home, is accessible to the public. Her Osborne residences, Osborne and Albert Cottages, remain in private ownership after their sale in 1912.

== Titles, styles, honours and arms ==
=== Titles and styles ===
- 14 April 1857 – 23 July 1885: Her Royal Highness The Princess Beatrice
- 23 July 1885 – 14 July 1917: Her Royal Highness The Princess Beatrice, Princess Henry of Battenberg
- 17 July 1917 – 26 October 1944: Her Royal Highness The Princess Beatrice

=== Honours ===
British honours

- 1 January 1878: Order of the Crown of India
- 8 January 1919: Dame Grand Cross of the British Empire
- 12 June 1926: Dame Grand Cross of St John
- 11 May 1937: Dame Grand Cross of the Royal Victorian Order
- Royal Order of Victoria and Albert
- Royal Red Cross

Foreign honours

- (Russian Empire) Grand Cross of St. Catherine
- (Kingdom of Portugal) 11 September 1875: Dame of the Order of Queen Saint Isabel
- (Grand Duchy of Hesse) 25 April 1885: Dame of the Golden Lion
- (Spain) 27 May 1889: Dame of the Order of Queen Maria Luisa

=== Arms ===
In 1858, Beatrice and the three younger of her sisters were granted use of the royal arms, with an inescutcheon of the shield of Saxony and differenced by a label of three points argent. On Beatrice's arms, the outer points bore roses gules, and the centre a heart gules. In 1917, the inescutcheon was dropped by royal warrant from George V.

Beatrice's coat of arms (1858–1917)

Beatrice's coat of arms marshalled with those of her husband and surrounded by the Order of Queen Maria Luisa

== Issue ==
Portrait	Name	Birth	Death	Notes
	Prince Alexander of Battenberg later Alexander Mountbatten, 1st Marquess of Carisbrooke	23 November 1886	23 February 1960	married Lady Irene Denison (4 July 1890 – 16 July 1956) on 19 July 1917. 1 daughter (Lady Iris Mountbatten, 1920–1982).
	Princess Victoria Eugénie of Battenberg (mostly known as Ena) later Queen of Spain	24 October 1887	15 April 1969	married Alfonso XIII of Spain (17 May 1886 – 28 February 1941) on 31 May 1906; 2 daughters, 5 sons (1 stillborn), (including Infante Juan, Count of Barcelona, 1913–1993, father of Juan Carlos I of Spain).
	Prince Leopold of Battenberg later Lord Leopold Mountbatten	21 May 1889	23 April 1922	Suffered from haemophilia; died unmarried and without issue during a knee operation.
	Prince Maurice of Battenberg	3 October 1891	27 October 1914	Died of wounds from action during World War I. Unmarried and without issue.

== Ancestry ==
Ancestors of Princess Beatrice of the United Kingdom

8. Francis, Duke of Saxe-Coburg-Saalfeld (= 14)
4. Ernest I, Duke of Saxe-Coburg and Gotha
9. Countess Augusta of Reuss-Ebersdorf (= 15)
2. Prince Albert of Saxe-Coburg and Gotha
10. Augustus, Duke of Saxe-Gotha-Altenburg
5. Princess Louise of Saxe-Gotha-Altenburg
11. Duchess Louise Charlotte of Mecklenburg-Schwerin
1. Princess Beatrice of the United Kingdom
12. George III the United Kingdom
6. Prince Edward, Duke of Kent and Strathearn
13. Charlotte of Mecklenburg-Strelitz
3. Victoria of the United Kingdom
14. Francis, Duke of Saxe-Coburg-Saalfeld (= 8)
7. Princess Victoria of Saxe-Coburg-Saalfeld
15. Countess Augusta of Reuss-Ebersdorf (= 9)

== Notes ==
Princess Beatrice of the United Kingdom House of Saxe-Coburg and Gotha Cadet branch of the House of Wettin Born: 14 April 1857 Died: 25 October 1944
Honorary titles
Preceded by Prince Henry of Battenberg	Governor of the Isle of Wight; 1896–1944	Succeeded by The Duke of Wellington
