= Lady Iris Mountbatten =

English actress and model (1920–1982)

Lady Iris Kemp
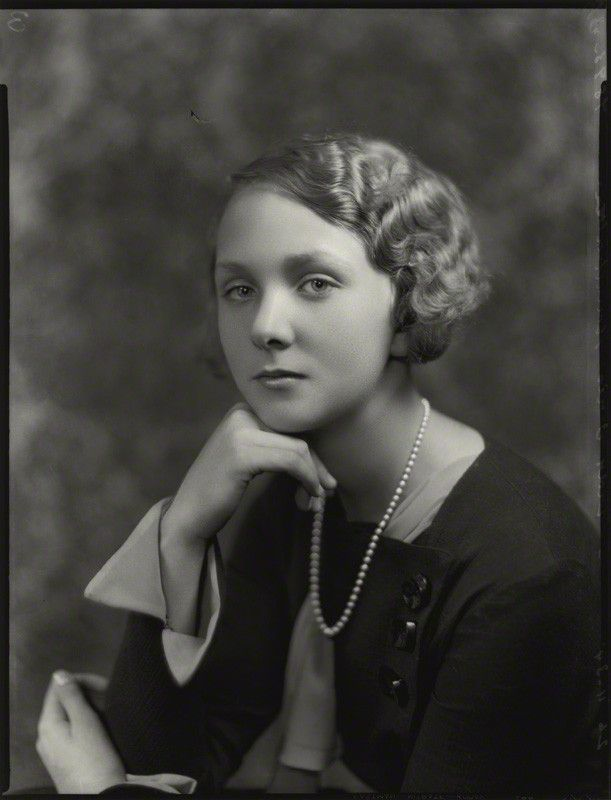
- Lady Iris in 1934
- Born: Iris Victoria Beatrice Grace Mountbatten; 13 January 1920; Kensington Palace, London, England
- Died: 1 September 1982 (aged 62); Toronto, Ontario, Canada
- Occupations: Actress, model
- Spouses: Hamilton Joseph O'Malley (m. 1941; div. 1946) Michael Neely Bryan (m. 1957; div. 1957) William Alexander Kemp (m. 1965)
- Children: Robin Alexander Bryan
- Parent(s): Alexander Mountbatten, 1st Marquess of Carisbrooke; Lady Irene Denison
- Family: Battenberg/Mountbatten

Lady Iris Victoria Beatrice Grace Kemp (née Mountbatten, formerly O'Malley, later Bryan; 13 January 1920 – 1 September 1982) was an English actress and model, and a member of the Battenberg/Mountbatten family. She was the youngest great-grandchild of Queen Victoria. She was also a niece of Queen Victoria Eugenie of Spain, making her a first cousin of Infante Juan, Count of Barcelona, father of Juan Carlos I and grandfather of current King Felipe VI of Spain, as well as Infante Jaime, Duke of Segovia, the Legitimist claimant to the French throne. She was also a second cousin of Prince Philip, Duke of Edinburgh, consort of Queen Elizabeth II, and of Edward VIII, George VI and Olav V of Norway.

== Family and early life ==
Iris Victoria Beatrice Grace Mountbatten was born at Kensington Palace, London on 13 January 1920, the only child of Alexander Mountbatten, 1st Marquess of Carisbrooke, eldest of three sons and one daughter of Princess Beatrice and Prince Henry of Battenberg. Her mother, the Marchioness of Carisbrooke, was born Lady Irene Frances Adza Denison (4 July 1890 – 16 July 1956) the only daughter of William Francis Henry Denison, 2nd Earl of Londesborough and Lady Grace Adelaide Fane (3 October 1860 – 13 June 1933), a daughter of Francis William Henry Fane, 12th Earl of Westmorland.

Lady Carisbrooke had two brothers of whom only one, Hugo William Cecil Denison, 4th and last Earl of Londesborough, was married. He and his wife had one child, Iris's only maternal first cousin, Lady Zinnia Rosemary Denison (25 November 1937 – 13 July 1997) a keen equestrian and Master of the Whaddon Chase Hunt 1982–84. 'The Lady Zinnia Judd Challenge Trophy' named in memory of her, is presented in the Hunter Championship for the 'Best Hunter in Show' at the Royal Windsor Horse Show.

On 29 November 1934, Iris was a bridesmaid at the wedding of her third cousin, Princess Marina of Greece and Denmark, to Iris’ second cousin, Prince George, Duke of Kent. (Marina and Iris were related through the Hesse family, while George and Iris were both great-grandchildren of Queen Victoria.) On 4 September 1935, at St. Oswald's Church, Blankney, Lincolnshire, she was a bridesmaid at the wedding of her uncle Lord Londesborough to Marigold Rosemary Joyce Lubbock (15 May 1903 – 15 May 1976). On 12 May 1937 at their coronation, Iris was one of the six train bearers to Queen Elizabeth, wife and consort of her second cousin King George VI.

She attended a variety of royal and aristocratic events in her youth, being a well known and much photographed débutante. During World War II she worked as a nurse's aide, later moving to the United States, where she taught dance. She became an actress and model, appearing as a hostess for a live TV children's programme Versatile Varieties (CBS Television, 1951), which featured actresses Eva Marie Saint and Edie Adams. She also appeared endorsing Pond's Creams and Warrens Mint Cocktail Gum.

== Marriages ==
Lady Iris was married three times. On 29 January 1941 Lady Iris received Royal Licence by King George VI to marry Captain (later Major) Hamilton Joseph Keyes O'Malley (after an engagement formally announced in The Times on 18 January 1941). They married on 15 February 1941 (privately, to satisfy the groom's faith) at St Paul's RC Church, Haywards Heath, West Sussex, but then were married in the rites of the Church of England at St Mary's CE Parish in Balcombe, West Sussex. They divorced on 24 September 1946. Lady Iris formally reverted to her maiden name of Mountbatten by Deed poll dated 7 January 1949. They had no children.

On 5 May 1957, at Pound Ridge, New York, she married Michael Neely Bryan (9 August 1916 – 20 August 1972), son of James R. Bryan and Laura A. Neely, an American jazz musician. They divorced months later, in 1957. Lady Iris, by her second marriage, had one child, Robin Alexander Bryan (born Mount Sinai Hospital, Manhattan, New York City, 20 December 1957).

On 11 December 1965, she married William Alexander Kemp (10 July 1921 – 12 December 1991), son of Clarence Arthur Kemp and Helen Janet Ballantyne, a Canadian actor and announcer. They had no children.

== Death ==
Lady Iris died on 1 September 1982 at Wellesley Hospital, Toronto, Ontario, Canada, of a brain tumour. Her funeral was held at St. Paul's, Bloor Street, in Toronto. Her ashes were brought to the Isle of Wight for interment in the Battenberg Chapel, at St. Mildred's Church, Whippingham.
