= Alexander Mountbatten, 1st Marquess of Carisbrooke =

British Royal Navy officer (1886–1960)

The Most Honourable The Marquess of Carisbrooke GCB GCVO GCStJ
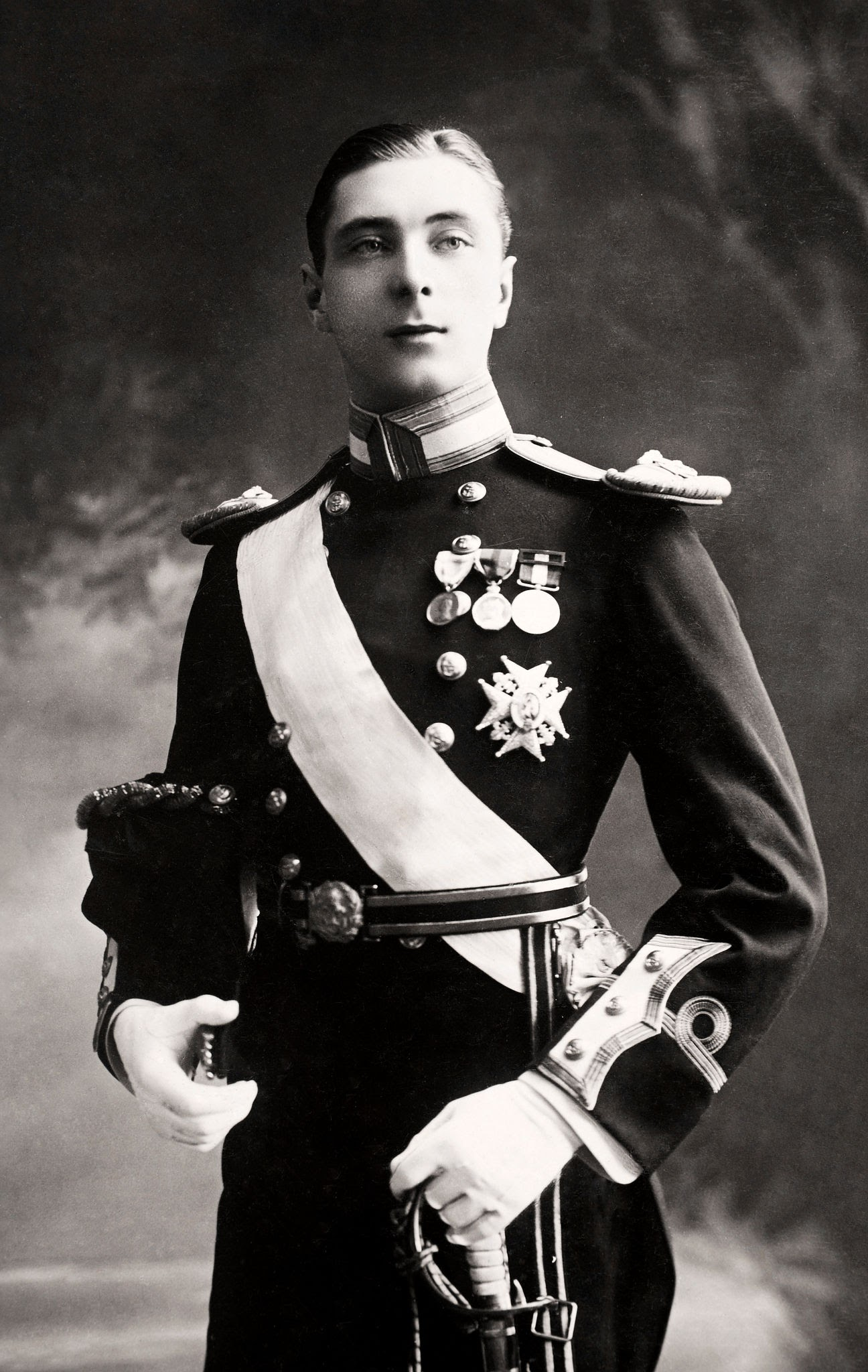
- Wearing the Grand Cross of the Order of Charles III
- Born: Prince Alexander Albert of Battenberg; 23 November 1886; Windsor Castle, Berkshire, United Kingdom
- Died: 23 February 1960 (aged 73); Kensington Palace, London, United Kingdom
- Burial place: Whippingham Church, Isle of Wight
- Spouse: Lady Irene Denison (m. 1917; died 1956)
- Children: Lady Iris Kemp
- Relatives: Prince Henry of Battenberg; Princess Beatrice of the United Kingdom
- Military career
- Allegiance: United Kingdom
- Branch: Royal Navy; British Army; Royal Air Force
- Service years: 1902–08; 1909–19; 1941–45
- Rank: Lieutenant (RN); Captain (British Army); Flight Lieutenant (RAF)
- Units: Grenadier Guards; Royal Air Force
- Conflicts: Second Boer War; First World War; Second World War

Marquess of Carisbrooke
- In office 7 November 1917 – 23 February 1960

Coat of arms of Alexander Mountbatten. He used a coronet of a child of a daughter of a Sovereign above the shield rather than a marquess's coronet.

Alexander Albert Mountbatten, 1st Marquess of Carisbrooke (born Prince Alexander Albert of Battenberg; 23 November 1886 – 23 February 1960) was a British Royal Navy officer, a member of the Hessian princely Battenberg family and the last surviving grandson of Queen Victoria.

== Early life ==
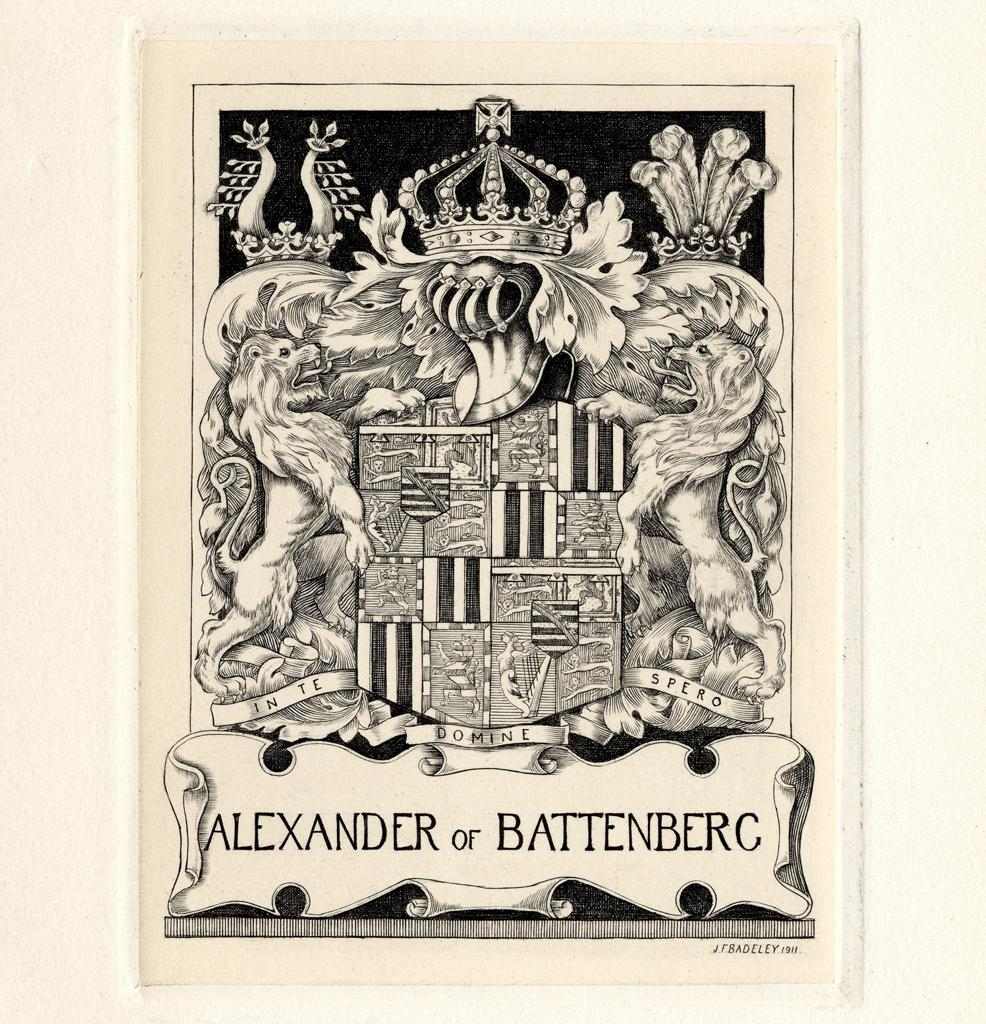
Bookplate by Henry Badeley showing the coat of arms used by Alexander as member of Battenberg family (until 1917)

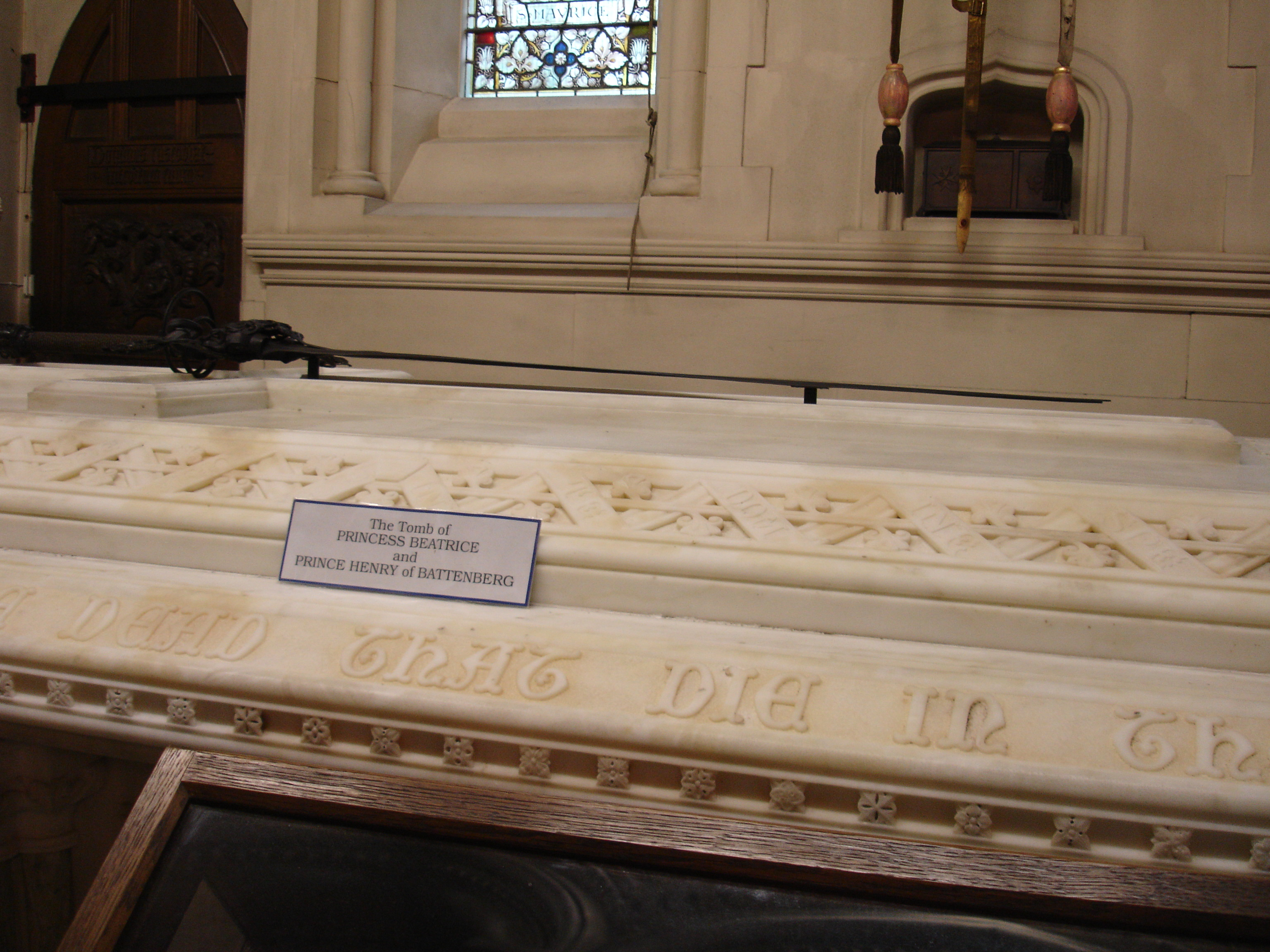
Tomb of Princess Beatrice and Prince Henry of Battenberg, with Lord Carisbrooke's ashes casket set into the wall above

Alexander, known as Drino, was born in 1886 at Windsor Castle in Berkshire and was educated at Wellington College and at the Britannia Royal Naval College. His father was Prince Henry of Battenberg, the son of Prince Alexander of Hesse and by Rhine and Julie née Countess of Hauke. His mother was Princess Beatrice of the United Kingdom, the fifth daughter and the youngest child of Queen Victoria and Prince Albert.

Prince Henry of Battenberg was the product of a morganatic marriage and took his style of Prince of Battenberg from his mother, Julia von Hauke, who was created Princess of Battenberg in her own right. At his birth, Alexander was styled His Serene Highness Prince Alexander of Battenberg because the child of a morganatic marriage is ineligible for "Grand-Ducal Highness" status. However, three weeks after his birth, on 13 December 1886, he was styled His Highness under a Royal Warrant passed by his grandmother Queen Victoria.

He was baptised in the White Drawing Room of Windsor Castle on 18 December 1886. His godparents were Queen Victoria of the United Kingdom (his maternal grandmother), Prince Alexander of Hesse and by Rhine (his paternal grandfather), the Prince of Wales (his maternal uncle), Prince Alexander of Battenberg (his paternal uncle), and Princess Irene of Hesse and by Rhine (his maternal first cousin and paternal second cousin).

Alexander was the brother-in-law to Alfonso XIII of Spain, who married Alexander's sister, Princess Victoria Eugenia, in 1906.

== Military service and honours ==
Alexander passed a qualifying examination to become service cadet in the Royal Navy in March 1902, and subsequently joined the cadet training ship HMS Britannia at Dartmouth on 8 May 1902. He served in the Royal Navy from 1902 to 1908 and in 1910, became one of the earliest members of The Castaways' Club, an exclusive dining club for Naval officers who resigned while still junior but who wished to keep in touch with their former service. Several of his Mountbatten cousins were also subsequently members, including his first cousins once removed the Marquess of Milford Haven and Duke of Edinburgh. On 11 July 1908, he was awarded the Grand Cross of the Hessian Merit Order of Philip the Magnanimous.

In 1909, he joined the British Army, being appointed Second Lieutenant (on probation) in the Grenadier Guards on 4 August 1909. He was confirmed in the rank on 22 November 1911, and was promoted to Lieutenant on 15 August 1913. He was seconded to the staff to act as an extra aide-de-camp on 10 April 1915 and promoted to captain the same year.

On 1 June 1917, he was authorised to wear the insignia of the Russian Order of St Vladimir, fourth class with Swords, awarded "for distinguished service to the Allied cause." He resigned his commission on 19 June 1919 and was placed on the General Reserve of Officers, ranking as a Captain with seniority of 15 July 1915. He held several other foreign orders and decorations: Grand Cross and Collar of Order of Charles III (Spain), Order of Leopold, with swords (Belgium), Order of Saint Alexander Nevsky (Russia), Order of Naval Merit, fourth class (Spain), Order of the Nile (Egypt), Order of the Crown (Romania), and Croix de Guerre, with palms (France).

In the 1927 Birthday Honours he was appointed a Knight Grand Cross of the Order of the Bath (GCB).

During World War II, despite being in his mid-fifties, the Marquess joined the Royal Air Force and was commissioned an acting pilot officer on 6 June 1941. On 6 August, he was regraded as a pilot officer (on probation). He was confirmed in his rank on 6 June 1942 and was promoted to flying officer (war-substantive) on 6 August 1942. During the war, he was a staff officer attached to air chief marshal Sir Trafford Leigh-Mallory. He relinquished his commission on 21 May 1945, retaining the rank of flight lieutenant.

== Marquess of Carisbrooke ==
Anti-German feeling during World War I led George V to change the name of the Royal House in July 1917 from the House of Saxe-Coburg-Gotha to the House of Windsor. He also relinquished, on behalf of his various relatives who were British subjects, the use of all German titles and styles.

The Battenberg family relinquished their titles of Prince and Princess of Battenberg and the styles of Highness and Serene Highness. Under royal warrant, they instead took the surname Mountbatten, an Anglicised form of Battenberg. As such, Prince Alexander became Sir Alexander Mountbatten. On 7 November 1917, he was created Marquess of Carisbrooke, Earl of Berkhamsted and Viscount Launceston. (Carisbrooke, a village on the Isle of Wight, is the site of Carisbrooke Castle, at the time his mother Princess Beatrice's residence as Governor of the Isle of Wight. Berkhamsted and Lauceston (in Hertfordshire and Cornwall respectively) had previously been used as the designations for royal peerages.)

In the 1930s, author E. F. Benson dedicated two of his famous novels, Mapp and Lucia and Lucia's Progress, to the Marquess of Carisbrooke.

== Marriage ==
On 19 July 1917, he married Lady Irene Denison (4 July 1890 – 16 July 1956), the only daughter of the 2nd Earl of Londesborough and his wife, Lady Grace Adelaide Fane, at the Chapel Royal of St James's Palace.

Lord and Lady Carisbrooke had one child, a daughter:

- Lady Iris Mountbatten (13 January 1920 – 1 September 1982)

Carisbrooke was likely homosexual or bisexual; according to the published diaries of Cecil Beaton, in his later years, Lord Carisbrooke had a longtime male lover, Simon Fleet. More is written about Lord Carisbrooke and his wife in the published diaries of James Lees-Milne and Henry "Chips" Channon.

=== Residences ===
By 1926 Lord and Lady Carisbrooke had established a London residence at No. 4 Belgrave Place, Belgravia, which continued to be their London home until early 1931. By 1938 Lord and Lady Carisbrooke lived at Kensington Palace.

After the Second World War the Carisbrookes lived in a grace-and-favour residence, King's Cottage, in Kew Gardens. Following the death of Lady Carisbrooke in 1956, Lord Carisbrooke was granted the use of a grace-and-favour residence, Apartment 10, Kensington Palace, which remained as his home until his death in 1960.

== Later career ==
Lord Carisbrooke, who received no state allowance, became the first member of the British royal family to work in the commercial sector. He began his career working as an entry-level clerk in the offices of Lazard Brothers bankers. He later worked for a company that oversaw housing estates, and before long he took control of social work for the tenants. Later he became a director of Lever Brothers and several other prominent corporations.

== Death ==
Lord Carisbrooke died on 23 February 1960, aged 73, at Kensington Palace. His ashes were interred within the Battenberg Chapel at St. Mildred's Church, Whippingham, on the Isle of Wight. As he had no sons, the title Marquess of Carisbrooke became extinct upon his death.

== Ancestry ==
Ancestors of Alexander Mountbatten, 1st Marquess of Carisbrooke

8. Louis II of Hesse
4. Prince Alexander of Hesse and by Rhine
9. Princess Wilhelmine of Baden
2. Prince Henry of Battenberg
10. Count Johann Moritz von Hauke
5. Julia, Princess of Battenberg
11. Sophie Lafontaine
1. Alexander Mountbatten, 1st Marquess of Carisbrooke
12. Ernest I of Saxe-Coburg and Gotha
6. Prince Albert of Saxe-Coburg and Gotha
13. Princess Louise of Saxe-Gotha-Altenburg
3. Princess Beatrice of the United Kingdom
14. Prince Edward, Duke of Kent and Strathearn
7. Queen Victoria of the United Kingdom
15. Princess Victoria of Saxe-Coburg-Saalfeld
