= Ypres Salient =

Section of the Western Front of World War I in Ypres, Belgium

The Ypres Salient was a military salient around Ypres, Belgium. Several battles took place in the salient and it was a big part of the Western Front during the First World War.

== Location ==
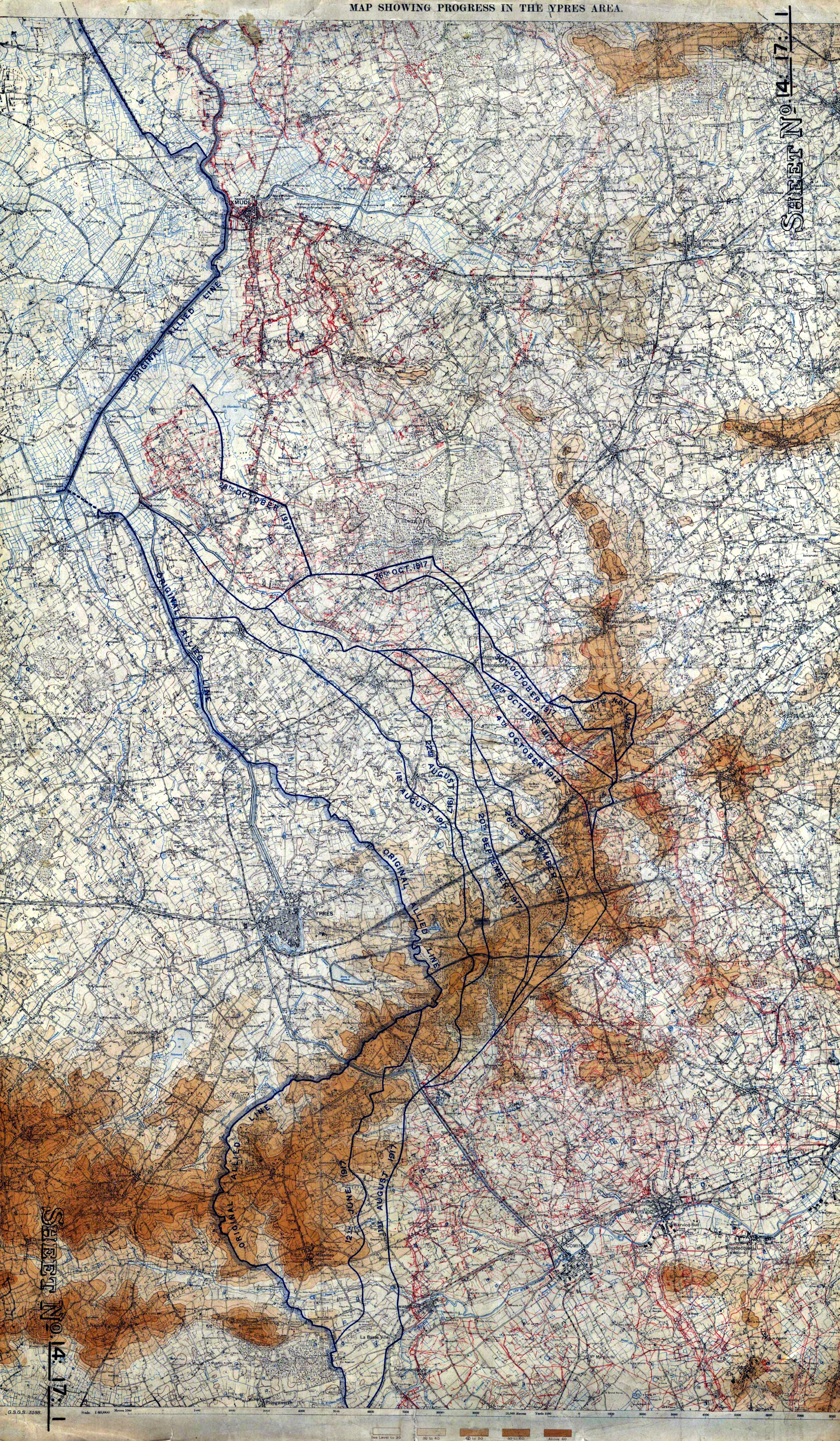
A map showing topography and locations in the Ypres district, detailing British–French advances at Ypres, 1917

Ypres lies at the junction of the Ypres–Comines Canal and the Ieperlee. The city is overlooked by Kemmel Hill in the south-west and from the east by low hills running south-west to north-east with Wytschaete (Wijtschate), Hill 60 to the east of Verbrandenmolen, Hooge, Polygon Wood and Passchendaele (Passendale). The high point of the ridge is at Wytschaete, 7,000 yd (4.0 mi; 6.4 km) from Ypres, while at Hollebeke the ridge is 4,000 yd (2.3 mi; 3.7 km) distant and recedes to 7,000 yd (4.0 mi; 6.4 km) at Polygon Wood. Wytschaete is about 150 ft (46 m) above the plain; on the Ypres–Menin road at Hooge, the elevation is about 100 ft (30 m) and 70 ft (21 m) at Passchendaele. The rises are slight, apart from the vicinity of Zonnebeke, which has a 1:33 gradient.

From Hooge and to the east, the slope is 1:60 and near Hollebeke, it is 1:75; the heights are subtle but have the character of a saucer lip around Ypres. The main ridge has spurs sloping east and one is particularly noticeable at Wytschaete, which runs 2 mi (3.2 km) south-east to Messines (Mesen), with a gentle slope to the east and a 1:10 decline to the west. Further south is the muddy valley of the Douve river, Ploegsteert Wood ("Plugstreet" to the British) and Hill 63. West of Messines Ridge is the parallel Wulverghem (Spanbroekmolen) Spur; the Oosttaverne Spur, also parallel, is to the east. The general aspect south of Ypres is of low ridges and dips, gradually flattening to the north into a featureless plain.

In 1914, Ypres had 2,354 houses and 16,700 inhabitants inside medieval earth ramparts faced with brick and a ditch on the east and south sides. Possession of the higher ground to the south and east of the city gives ample scope for ground observation, enfilade fire and converging artillery fire. An occupier of the ridges also has the advantage that artillery positions and the movement of reinforcements and supplies can be screened from view.

The ridge had woods from Wytschaete to Zonnebeke, giving good cover, some of notable size such as Polygon Wood and those later named Battle Wood, Shrewsbury Forest and Sanctuary Wood. The woods usually had undergrowth, but fields in gaps between the woods were 800–1,000 yd (730–910 m) wide and devoid of cover. Roads in this area were usually unpaved, except for the main ones from Ypres, with occasional villages and houses.

The lowlands west of the ridge were a mixture of meadow and fields with high hedgerows dotted with trees, cut by streams and ditches emptying into the canals. The Ypres–Comines Canal is about 18 ft (5.5 m) wide and the Yperlee about 36 ft (11 m); the main road to Ypres between Poperinge and Vlamertinge is in a defile, easily observed from the ridge.

== Battles ==
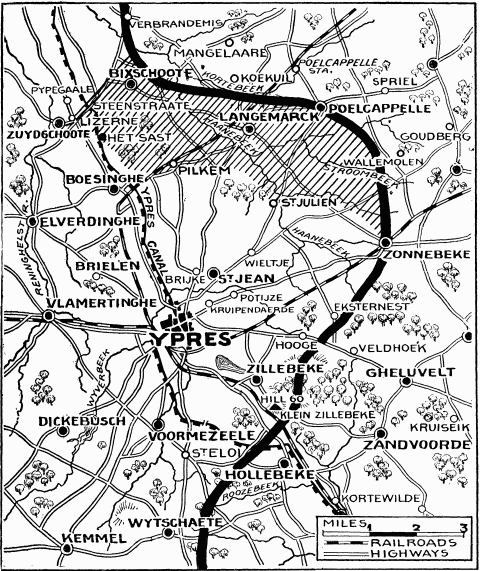
The Ypres Salient during the Second Battle of Ypres

A salient in military terms is a battlefield feature that projects into an opponent's territory and is surrounded on three sides, making the occupying troops vulnerable. Throughout World War I along the Western Front, troops engaged in mine warfare, using tunnelling and trench strategies without coordinating their attacks with one another. Soldiers used tunnels and dugouts to shelter themselves, make their way safely to the front lines, relay messages, and launch offensive attacks on their enemies.

=== First Battle of Ypres ===
By 29 December 1914, German troops dug in on higher ground to the east of Ypres and consequently, the Ypres Salient was formed by British, French, Canadian and Belgian defensive efforts against German incursion during the 1914 Race to the Sea. This culminated in the Battle of the Yser and the First Battle of Ypres, which lasted until 22 November. German and British units conducted operations, made advancements, captured territory and attacked using mines and underground warfare at locations like Broodseinde and Sint Elooi.

=== Second and Third Battles of Ypres ===
The Second Battle of Ypres occurred from 22 April to 25 May 1915, the British and French defending Ypres and the corner of Belgium around Veurne from German occupation but escalating trench warfare in the salient. Both sides vied for control of tactically important areas along the line. Obtaining control of the few hills and ridges became the objective of this battle in which poisonous gas as a weapon was first deployed and the widespread destruction and evacuation of Ypres came about.

During this battle, the Allied units were forced to draw back from Zonnebeke and Saint-Julien to a line of trenches closer to Ypres as German troops held the village of Hooge on Bellewaerde Ridge. This line defined the Ypres Salient for over two years, during which Hooge lay in one of the easternmost sectors of the salient and was much contested. This situation changed little, despite extensive British tunnelling prior to the Battle of Messines in June 1917 and the Third Battle of Ypres (Passchendaele) from July to November. During these battles, tactics shifted from offensive tunnelling to maintaining shelters and constructing dugouts.

=== Fourth Battle of Ypres ===
After the Third Battle of Ypres, the Ypres Salient was left relatively quiet until the Fourth Battle of Ypres (Battle of the Lys), when the German spring offensive threatened to overwhelm the area. This offensive was stopped at the point the Allies were closest to being forced to abandon the salient. By August 1918, the Fifth Battle of Ypres, part of the Hundred Days Offensive, pushed the German forces out of the salient entirely, and they did not return.

== Archaeological significance ==
In the aftermath of trench warfare, mine explosions, extensive tunnelling, craters and archaeological landmarks remain. Although many craters have been covered, built over, destroyed, or remodelled, some are still visible and can be preserved, such as The Bluff, a key location in the First Battle of Ypres and now a well-studied historical reserve at which artefacts were found.

Using Geographic Information System (GIS) mapping, Airborne Laser Scanning (ALS), remote sensing and aerial photographs, more recent research and archaeological work have provided insight into the landscape, battle zones and tactics employed in the Ypres Salient. Analysis of craters at the site yielded information, confirming various historical accounts of counter-mines and hot spots, specifying when mining weapons were used in the Second Battle of Ypres and how the Battle of Messines was important in changing the geography of the front where most fighting occurred.

== See also ==
- Trench warfare
- Tunnel warfare
- Western Front (World War I)
- The Ypres League
- Earl of Ypres
- Wipers Times
- Hill 60 (Ypres)
- Sint-Elooi
- Battle of Mont Sorrel
- Actions of the Bluff, 1916
- Lange Max Museum
- Yser
- List of World War I memorials and cemeteries in Flanders
