= Wedding of Princess Patricia and Alexander Ramsay =

1919 royal wedding

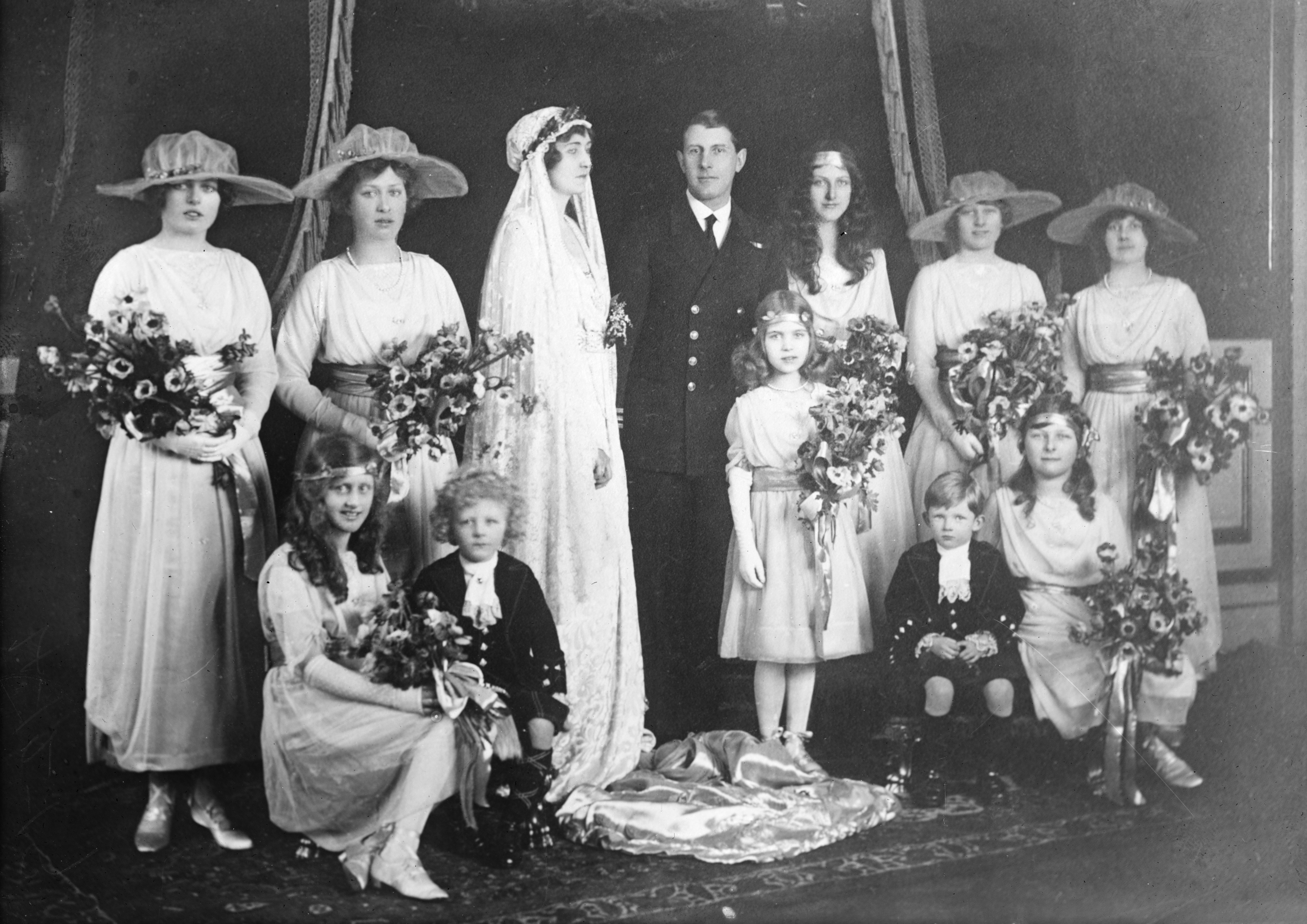
- The couple and the wedding party
- Date: 27 February 1919; 107 years ago
- Venue: Westminster Abbey
- Location: London, United Kingdom
- Participants: Princess Patricia of Connaught; Alexander Ramsay

The wedding of Princess Patricia of Connaught and Commander The Honourable Alexander Ramsay took place on Thursday, 27 February 1919 at Westminster Abbey. Princess Patricia, a granddaughter of Queen Victoria, was a popular member of the British royal family, while Ramsay, third son of the 13th Earl of Dalhousie, was an officer in the Royal Navy.

It was the first royal wedding held at Westminster Abbey since Richard II married Anne of Bohemia there in 1382. Princess Patricia gave up her royal title upon marriage, leaving the Abbey as Lady Patricia Ramsay with precedence before marchionesses of England.

== Engagement ==
The marriage of Princess Patricia of Connaught had been the subject of much speculation throughout the Edwardian era. Rumoured suitors included the King of Spain, the Prince Royal of Portugal, the Hereditary Grand Duke of Mecklenburg-Strelitz and Grand Duke Michael Alexandrovich of Russia.

She reportedly first met Alexander Ramsay in 1908. A romance later developed when, in October 1911, Ramsay was appointed aide-de-camp to Princess Patricia's father, then Governor General of Canada. The Duke of Connaught disapproved of his daughter's choice. After much convincing and the end of the First World War, the engagement was announced in December 1918.

Her cousin, King George V, granted his consent to the marriage pursuant to the Royal Marriages Act 1772 on 11 February 1919.

== Wedding ==
Princess Patricia and Commodore Ramsay were married in Westminster Abbey at 12:00 GMT on Thursday, 27 February 1919. The Church of England marriage service was conducted by the Archbishop of Canterbury, Randall Davidson, assisted by the Dean of Westminster, Herbert Edward Ryle.

It was the first royal wedding to be celebrated in Westminster Abbey since Richard II married Anne of Bohemia in 1382. However, it began a trend for weddings of senior members of the British royal family, in the subsequent years, three of King George V's children were married there. It was also one of the first major social occasions since the end of World War I.

The bride was given away in marriage by her father, the Duke of Connaught and Strathearn. The Abbey was relatively sparsely decorated, at the request of the bride, a few white flowers and the Abbey's collection of gold plate.

Princess Patricia's Canadian Light Infantry (commonly known as the Patricias), a Canadian regiment named in her honour, provided a guard of honour along the processional route from the Abbey back to her father's residence, Clarence House, for the reception.

=== Music ===
Music was provided by the Westminster Abbey choir. The hymns sung were "Praise, my soul, the King of heaven", as the bride walked down the aisle, and "O Perfect Love, all human thought transcending", following the Archbishop's address. Psalm 64 was sung to a setting by Samuel Wesley. The anthem "Who is like unto Thee, O Lord?" by Sir Arthur Sullivan was sung during the signing of the register. Felix Mendelssohn's "Wedding March" was the recessional music.

=== Attire ===
Princess Patricia wore a "Venetian-style" white panné velvet gown with a silver lace overlay decorated with acorns and lover's knots. She wore a lace veil secured with a wreath of myrtle in her hair. The gown was later donated to the Princess Patricia's Canadian Light Infantry Gallery at The Military Museums in Calgary, Alberta, Canada, by her daughter-in-law, Lady Saltoun. Her bouquet, a gift from the Patricias, was also tied with the regimental colours.

King George V, in compliment to the groom, wore the uniform of an admiral of the fleet. Queen Mary work a silver grey crêpe gown. Court mourning for Prince John, the King and Queen's youngest son who had died a month prior, was relaxed for the day, allowing ladies to wear colourful gowns.

=== Attendants ===
Princess Patricia was attended by eight bridesmaids and two page boys:

- The Princess Mary
- Princess Ingrid of Sweden (the bride's niece)
- Princess Maud
- Lady Mary Cambridge
- Lady Helena Cambridge
- Lady May Cambridge
- Lady Ida Ramsay (the groom's niece)
- Lady Jean Ramsay (the groom's niece)
- Earl of Macduff (the bride's nephew)
- The Hon. Simon Ramsay (the groom's nephew)

=== Titles after marriage ===
Princess Patricia voluntarily renounced the title of Princess of the United Kingdom with the style of Royal Highness. She was granted by Royal Warrant on 25 February 1919 the style of Lady Victoria Patricia Helena Elizabeth Ramsay, with special precedence immediately before the marchionesses of England.

Ramsay, who held the courtesy style The Honourable from birth as the younger son of an earl, had no immediate change in title or style after his marriage, but was later knighted in 1932.

== Guests ==
Notable guests in attendance included:

=== Relatives of the bride ===
- The Duke of Connaught and Strathearn, the bride's father
  - The Crown Princess and Crown Prince of Sweden, the bride's sister and brother-in-law
    - Princess Ingrid of Sweden, the bride's niece
  - Prince and Princess Arthur of Connaught, Duchess of Fife, the bride's brother and sister-in-law
    - Earl of Macduff, the bride's nephew
- Queen Alexandra, the bride's paternal aunt by marriage
  - The King and Queen, the bride's paternal first cousin and his wife
    - The Prince of Wales, the bride's paternal first cousin once removed
    - The Prince Albert, the bride's paternal first cousin once removed
    - The Princess Mary, the bride's paternal first cousin once removed
  - The Princess Royal, the bride's paternal first cousin
    - Princess Maud, the bride's paternal first cousin once removed
  - The Princess Victoria, the bride's paternal first cousin
- Princess Christian, the bride's paternal aunt
  - Princess Marie Louise, the bride's paternal first cousin
- The Princess Louise, Duchess of Argyll, the bride's paternal aunt
- The Dowager Duchess of Albany, the bride's paternal aunt by marriage
  - Princess Alice, Countess of Athlone, and the Earl of Athlone, the bride's paternal first cousin and her husband
    - Lady May Cambridge, the bride's paternal first cousin once removed
- The Princess Beatrice, the bride's paternal aunt
- The Marchioness and Marquess of Milford Haven, the bride's paternal first cousin and her husband
  - Earl and Countess of Medina, the bride's paternal first cousin once removed and his wife
- The Marquess and Marchioness of Cambridge, the bride's paternal second cousin once removed and his wife
  - Lady Mary Cambridge, the bride's paternal third cousin
  - Lady Helena Cambridge, the bride's paternal third cousin
- Queen Amélie of Portugal, widow of the bride's paternal third cousin
  - King Manuel II and Queen Augusta Victoria of Portugal, the bride's paternal third cousins once removed

=== Relatives of the groom ===
- The Earl and Countess of Dalhousie, the groom's brother and sister-in-law
  - Lord Ramsay, the groom's nephew
  - Lady Ida Ramsay, the groom's niece
  - Lady Jean Ramsay, the groom's niece
  - The Hon. Simon Ramsay, the groom's nephew
