= The Duchess of Teck =

The Duchess of Teck may refer to:

- Margaret Cambridge, Marchioness of Cambridge (1873 – 1929), the sixth child and third daughter of the 1st Duke of Westminster and the wife of the 1st Marquess of Cambridge.
- Mary of Teck (1867 – 1953), Queen of the United Kingdom and the British Dominions, and Empress of India, from 1910 until 1936 as the wife of King-Emperor George V.
- Princess Mary Adelaide of Cambridge (1833 – 1897), a member of the British royal family.
