= Lord Frederick Cambridge =

British Army officer and lord

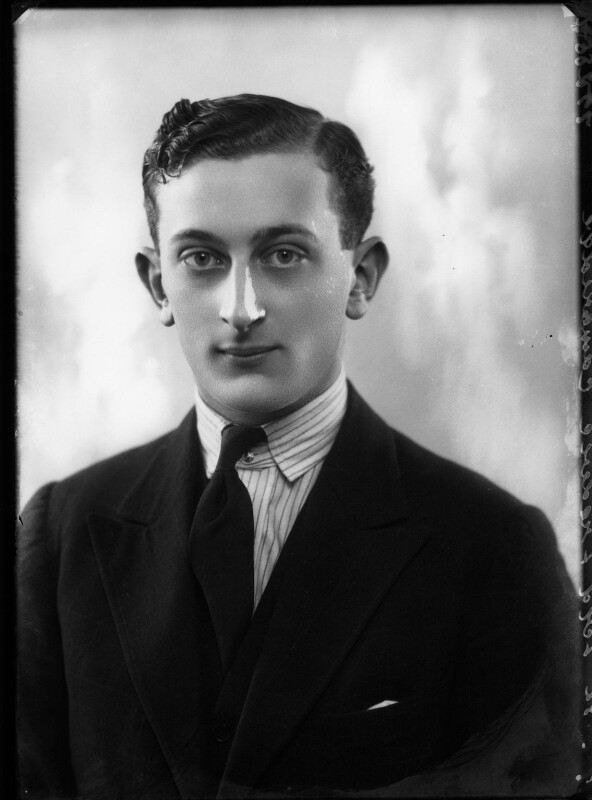
- Frederick in 1932
- Born: 24 September 1907; Vienna, Austria-Hungary
- Died: 15 May 1940 (aged 32); Leuven, Belgium
- Father: Adolphus Cambridge, 1st Marquess of Cambridge
- Mother: Lady Margaret Evelyn Grosvenor

Lord Frederick Cambridge (Frederick Charles Edward, born Prince Frederick of Teck; 24 September 1907 – 15 May 1940) was a relative of the British royal family. He was the younger son of Adolphus Cambridge, 1st Marquess of Cambridge, formerly the Duke of Teck, and a nephew of Queen Mary and King George V.

== Birth ==
Frederick was born on 24 September 1907 in Vienna, Austria, where his father was the British military attaché. At the time of his birth, his father was styled Prince Adolphus, Duke of Teck, the eldest son of Francis, Duke of Teck and Princess Mary Adelaide of Cambridge (a granddaughter of King George III). His mother was the Duchess of Teck (née Lady Margaret Evelyn Grosvenor), daughter of 3rd Marquess of Westminster (later 1st Duke of Westminster).

He was styled "His Serene Highness Prince Frederick of Teck" from his birth, and was educated at Ludgrove School.

== Name change during World War I ==
During the First World War, anti-German feeling in the United Kingdom led Frederick's uncle, King George V to change the name of the royal house from the German House of Saxe-Coburg-Gotha to the more English sounding House of Windsor. The King also renounced all his German titles for himself and all members of the British Royal Family who were British subjects.

In response to this, the Duke of Teck renounced, through a Royal Warrant from the King, dated 14 July 1917, his title of Duke of Teck in the Kingdom of Württemberg and the style "His Highness". Adolphus, along with his brother, Prince Alexander of Teck, adopted the name Cambridge, after their grandfather, Prince Adolphus, Duke of Cambridge.

Adolphus was subsequently created Marquess of Cambridge, Earl of Eltham, and Viscount Northallerton in the Peerage of the United Kingdom. Frederick's elder brother George, took the title Earl of Eltham as a courtesy title. Frederick became known as Lord Frederick Cambridge.

== Military career and death ==
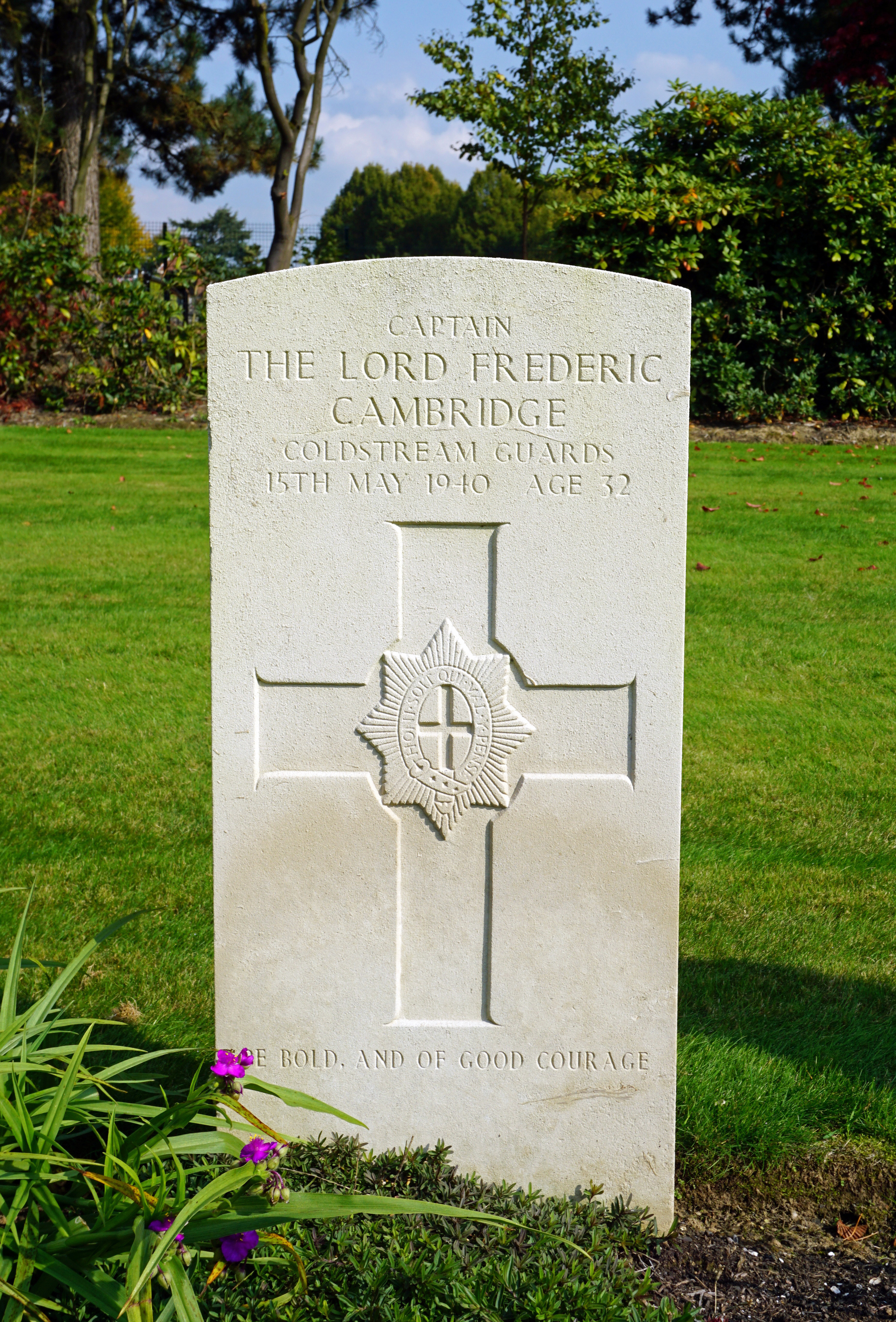
Grave, Heverlee War Cemetery

Frederick served as a captain in the Coldstream Guards and was killed in action in Belgium on 15 May 1940. On the day of his death, the 1st Battalion was heavily engaged in Northern Leuven. He is now buried in Heverlee War Cemetery.
