= Dorothy Cambridge, Marchioness of Cambridge =

British aristocrat (1899–1988)

The Most Honourable The Marchioness of Cambridge
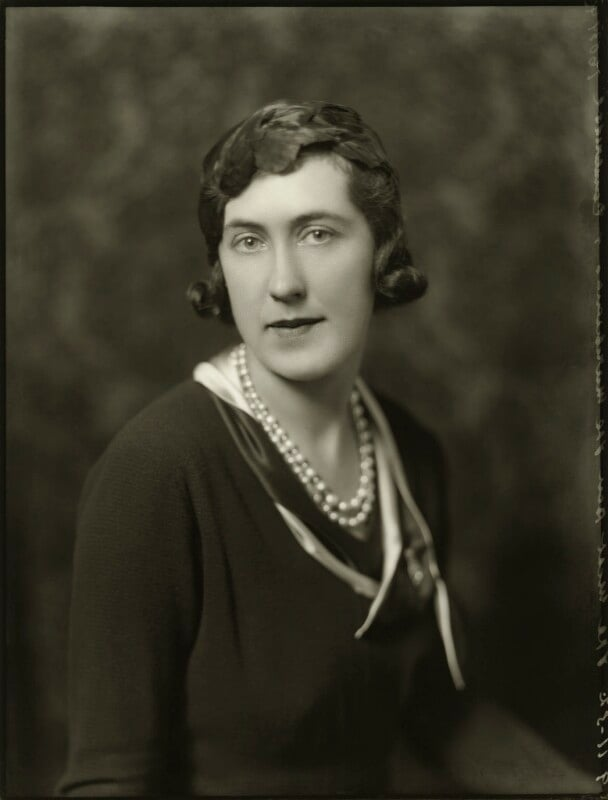
- Portrait by Bassano Ltd, 1932
- Born: Dorothy Isabel Westenra Hastings; 18 May 1899; Cirencester, Gloucestershire, England
- Died: 1 April 1988 (aged 88); Bury St Edmunds, Suffolk, England
- Burial place: Royal Burial Ground, Frogmore
- Spouse: George Cambridge, 2nd Marquess of Cambridge (m. 1923; died 1981)
- Children: Lady Mary Whitley
- Father: Osmond Hastings
- Relatives: Warner Hastings, 15th Earl of Huntingdon (uncle)

Dorothy Isabel Westenra Cambridge, Marchioness of Cambridge (née Hastings; 18 May 1899 – 1 April 1988) was a British aristocrat and author. She was the wife of George Cambridge, 2nd Marquess of Cambridge, a great-great-grandson of George III.

Although not a working member of the British royal family, she and her husband were regular attendees at major royal occasions throughout the twentieth century.

== Early life ==
Dorothy Isabel Westenra Hastings was born in Cirencester on 18 May 1899, the daughter of the Hon. Osmond William Toone Westenra Hastings, a younger son of the 14th Earl of Huntingdon, and his wife, Mary Caroline Campbell Tarratt. Through her father she belonged to the ancient Hastings family.

During World War I, she joined the Red Cross, working in the kitchens at Hampton Court Palace and in Appleby.

== Marriage ==
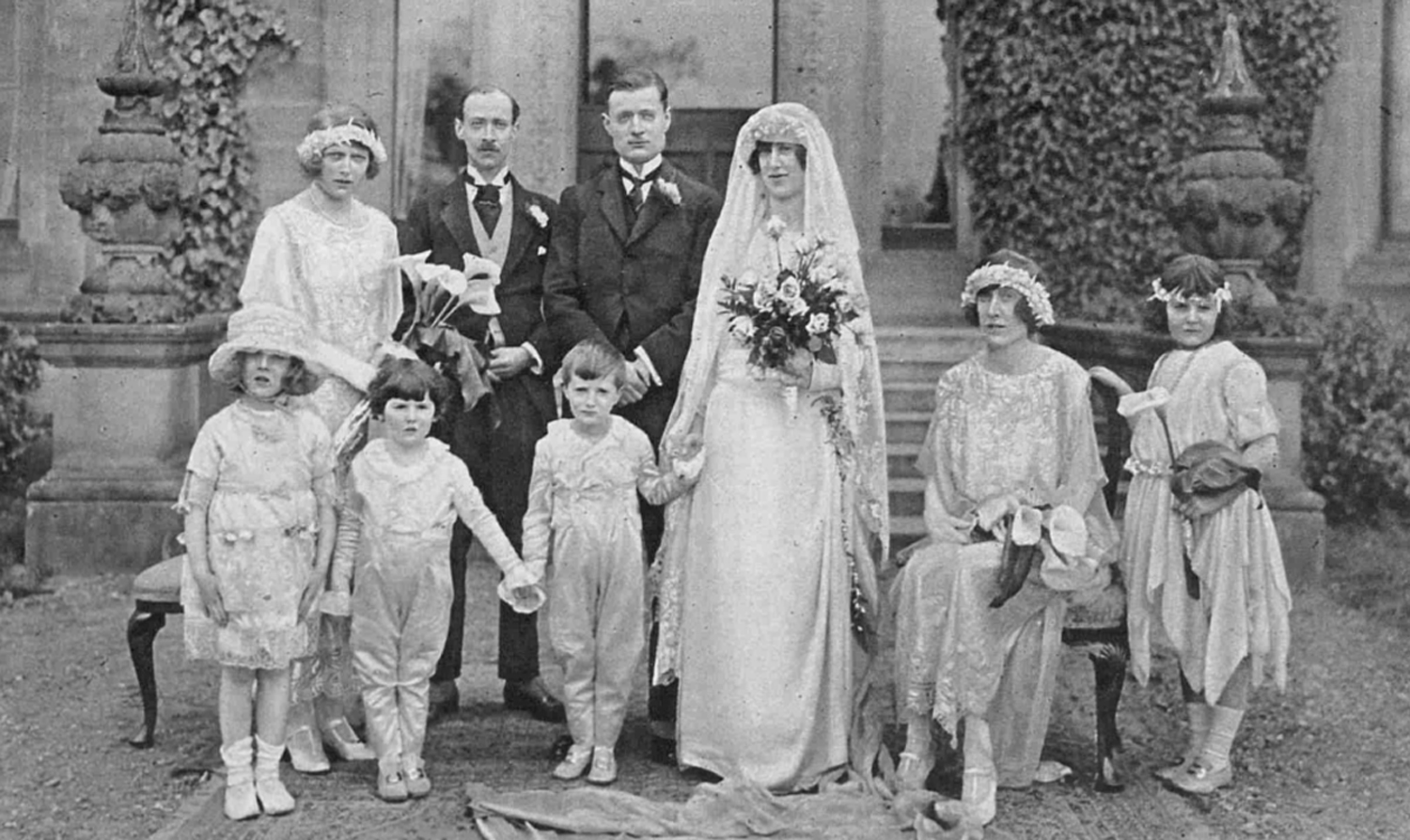
Marriage of Lord Eltham and Dorothy Hastings, 1923

On 10 April 1923, at St Mary-in-the-Elms, Old Woodhouse, Hastings married George Cambridge, 2nd Marquess of Cambridge, then styled Earl of Eltham, eldest son and heir of Adolphus Cambridge, 1st Marquess of Cambridge and Lady Margaret Grosvenor. The reception was held at Beaumanor Hall, the residence of her cousin, Lady Kathleen Curzon-Herrick. Through her marriage she became a member of the extended British royal family, her husband being a first cousin of George VI.

Upon her father-in-law's death in October 1927, her husband succeeded as 2nd Marquess of Cambridge, and she became Marchioness of Cambridge.

The couple had one child:

- Lady Mary Ilona Margaret Cambridge (24 September 1924 – 13 December 1999), who married Captain Peter Whitley and had issue.

== Public life ==
Lord and Lady Cambridge maintained close social ties with the British royal family and regularly attended major state and royal ceremonial occasions, although neither undertook official royal duties. She attended the coronations of George VI and Elizabeth II. Lady Cambridge frequently accompanied her husband at court functions and appeared in society and court portraiture during the interwar period and after the Second World War.

Portraits of Lady Cambridge by the photographic studio Bassano are held by the National Portrait Gallery, where she is represented in eight photographic portraits dating principally from 1923 and 1932.

Lord and Lady Cambridge lived for many years at the Old House in Little Abington, Cambridgeshire, where Lady Cambridge was active in village life and philanthropy, particularly the local branches of the Royal British Legion Women's Section and the Girl Guides.

In 1974, Lady Cambridge published The Royal Blue and Gold Cook Book, a collection of recipes originally compiled in 1937 but not published until nearly four decades later. Proceeds from the book were donated to the Royal British Legion Women's Section. Contributors included George VI and Queen Elizabeth, Princess Alice, Duchess of Gloucester, Princess Marina, Duchess of Kent, Princess Alice, Countess of Athlone, Lady Maud Carnegie, the Marquess of Anglesey, Clark Gable, and Sonja Henie.

== Later life and death ==
The Marchioness was widowed in 1981. As the couple's only child was a daughter, the marquessate and associated peerages became extinct upon his death.

Having been widowed two months earlier, she initially declined her invitation to the wedding of Prince Charles and Lady Diana Spencer, reportedly stating that she would "much rather go to the Little Abington Village Hall with the Over 60s Club, watch it on the television and give [her] own running commentary". She later relented and attended the wedding with her brother-in-law, the Duke of Beaufort.

Lady Cambridge died in a nursing home in Bury St Edmunds on 1 April 1988, aged 88. At the time of her death, she was the oldest living member of the royal family. Her funeral, held at St George's Chapel, Windsor Castle, on 7 April 1988, was attended by Queen Elizabeth the Queen Mother, Princess Margaret, Countess of Snowdon, and Princess Alice, Duchess of Gloucester. She was buried beside her husband in the Royal Burial Ground at Frogmore, Windsor.

== Bibliography ==
- Cambridge, The Marchioness of. The Royal Blue and Gold Cook Book. London: Jupiter Books, 1974. ISBN 0 904041 03 4
