= Lady Helena Gibbs =

British aristocrat

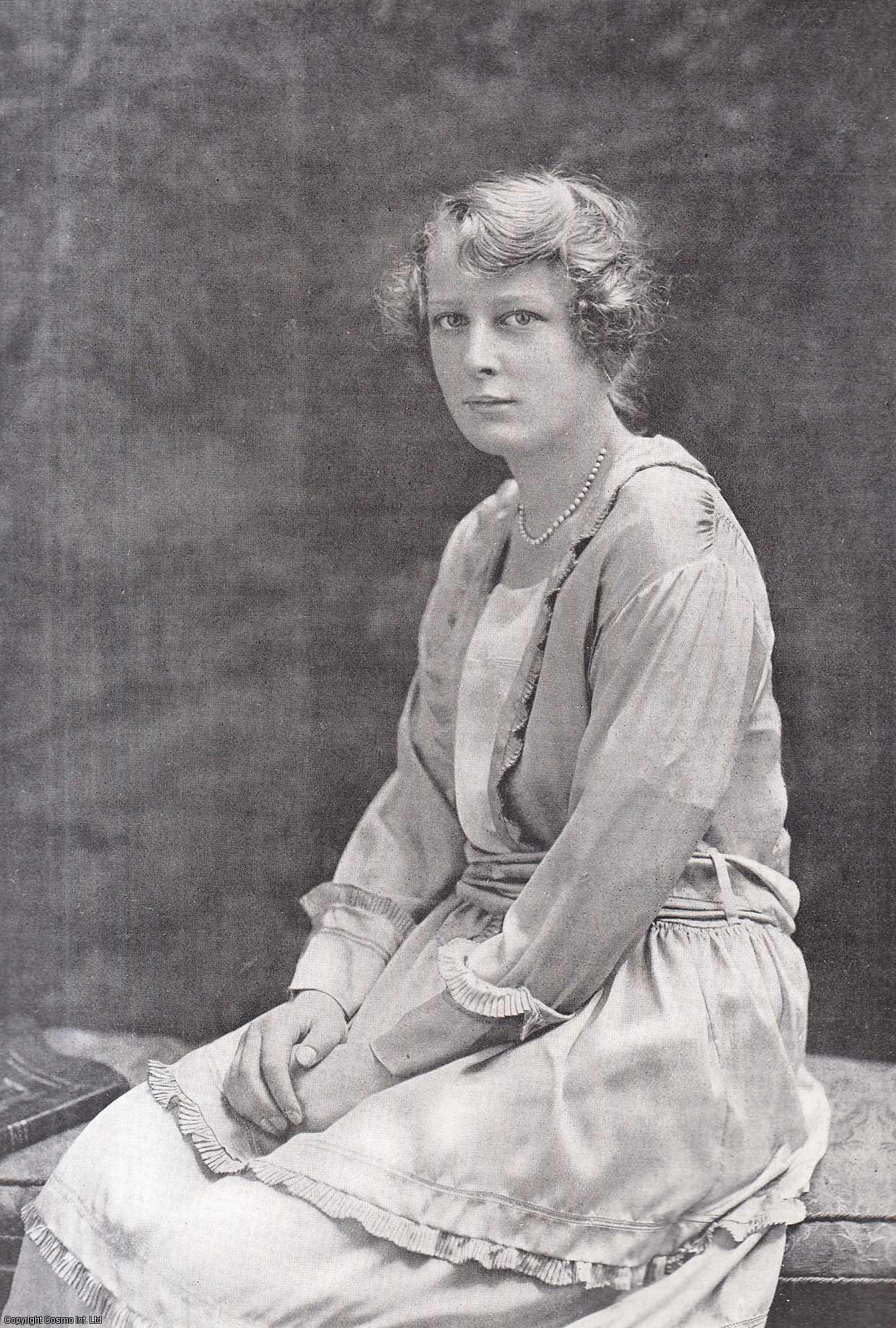
- Lady Helena in 1919, by Richard N. Speaight
- Born: Princess Helena Frances Augusta of Teck; 23 October 1899; Grosvenor House, Mayfair, Westminster
- Died: 22 December 1969 (aged 70); Badminton House, Gloucestershire, England
- Buried: 27 December 1969; St John the Baptist's Church, Shipton Moyne, Gloucestershire
- Spouse: John Evelyn Gibbs (m. 1919; died 1932)
- Father: Adolphus Cambridge, 1st Marquess of Cambridge
- Mother: Lady Margaret Grosvenor

Lady Helena Gibbs (Helena Frances Augusta; formerly Cambridge; 23 October 1899 – 22 December 1969), born Princess Helena of Teck, was a relative of the British royal family. She was a great-great-granddaughter of King George III and a niece of Queen Mary and King George V.

Born at Grosvenor House, Mayfair, Westminster, she was the second daughter of Prince Adolphus of Teck (later Adolphus Cambridge, 1st Marquess of Cambridge) and Lady Margaret Grosvenor (later Marchioness of Cambridge).

During the First World War, members of the British royal family and their close relatives including the House of Teck, relinquished their German titles. Helena then assumed the style Lady Helena Cambridge.

She married Colonel John Evelyn Gibbs in 1919 and was subsequently known as Lady Helena Gibbs. She died in 1969.

== Early life ==
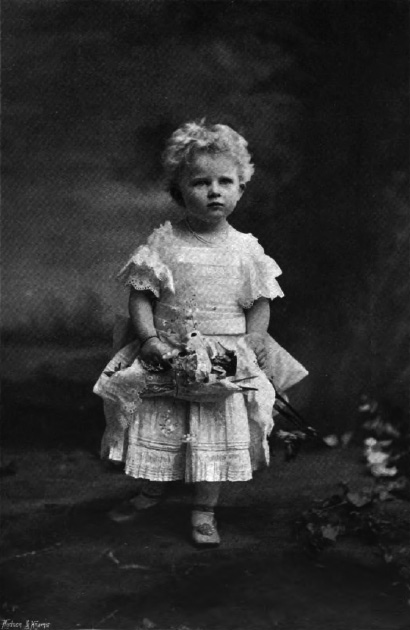
Photograph, 1903

Helena was born on 23 October 1899 at Grosvenor House, Mayfair, Westminster. Her father was Prince Adolphus of Teck (later the 2nd Duke of Teck and after 1917 the 1st Marquess of Cambridge), the eldest son of Prince Francis, Duke of Teck and Princess Mary Adelaide of Cambridge. Her mother was Lady Margaret Grosvenor, the third daughter of the 1st Duke of Westminster. She was the couple's second daughter. In 1919, a newspaper article included her mother's explanation that Helena and her siblings were not of royal rank and were brought up in "the simplest fashion" with the desire that they "should be regarded as ordinary members of the English titled and untitled aristocracy".

As a child of Prince Adolphus of Teck, Helena was styled "Her Serene Highness Princess Helena of Teck" at birth.

== Lady Helena Cambridge ==
During World War I, anti-German feeling in the United Kingdom led King George V to change the name of the royal house from the Germanic House of Saxe-Coburg-Gotha to the more English-sounding House of Windsor. The King also renounced all his Germanic titles for himself and all members of the British royal family.

In response to this, Helena's father renounced his title of Duke of Teck in the Kingdom of Württemberg and the style His Highness. Adolphus, along with his brother, Prince Alexander of Teck, adopted the name Cambridge, after their grandfather, Prince Adolphus, Duke of Cambridge.

He was subsequently created Marquess of Cambridge, Earl of Eltham, and Viscount Northallerton in the Peerage of the United Kingdom. Helena was entitled to the style of "Lady Helena Cambridge" as a daughter of a marquess.

Lady Helena was in attendance for the 1919 wedding of Princess Patricia to Alexander Ramsay.

== Marriage ==
Helena married Colonel John Evelyn Gibbs (22 December 1879 London – 11 October 1932 Tetbury), a veteran of the Boer Wars and World War I and grandson of famed Victorian businessman William Gibbs, on 2 September 1919 at St. George's Chapel, Windsor Castle. While Gibbs was a commoner, his elder brother George was raised to the peerage as Baron Wraxall in 1928. The marriage was approved by the King, who was originally to be present for the wedding, but later was not able to attend and instead sent a telegram of congratulations on the day after the wedding.

Upon the announcement of her engagement to Gibbs, Country Life placed her on the cover of their August 2, 1919 magazine. The wedding was covered in a multi-page article with photographs in The Sketch a British illustrated journal and also in the Tatler in the week following the wedding.

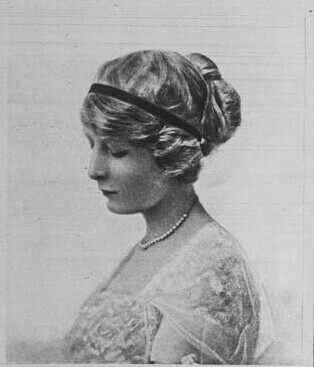
Lady Helena Gibbs née Cambridge in 1919

The wedding, which her parents wished to be a "quiet, ordinary wedding", hosted between four and five hundred people, and the party following the wedding was held at Frogmore Cottage. She wore a simple necklace of small pearls for the wedding, a dress of white Royal beaute material, and had six bridesmaids, including Lady May Cambridge. The best man was Lancelot Gibbs, the brother of the bridgegroom.

In 1921, Lady Helena helped open a children's home in Kingsdown in honor of her late sister-in-law, Victoria Gibbs. She also served as honorary host of a 1931 flower show in Montpellier.

Lady Helena and Gibbs had no children. She survived him by 37 years and died at Badminton House, her sister's home, on 22 December 1969. Her funeral service was held at the Church of St. Mary, Tetbury, Gloucestershire, on 27 December 1969.
