= George of Cambridge =

George of Cambridge may refer to:

- Prince George, Duke of Cambridge (1819–1904), born Prince George of Cambridge, a grandson of George III through his son Prince Adolphus, Duke of Cambridge
- George Cambridge, 2nd Marquess of Cambridge (1895–1981), great-great-grandson of King George III and nephew of Queen Mary
- Prince George of Wales (born 2013), grandson of Charles III and the son of William, Prince of Wales was called "Prince George of Cambridge" before his grandfather acceded
