= Lady Mary Cambridge =

Lady Mary Cambridge may refer to:

- Mary Somerset, Duchess of Beaufort (sportswoman) (1897–1987), formerly Lady Mary Cambridge
- Lady Mary Whitley (1924–1999), née Lady Mary Cambridge

== See also ==
- Lady May Abel Smith (1906–1994), formerly Lady May Cambridge
- Princess Mary Adelaide of Cambridge (1833–1897), mother of Mary, Queen of the United Kingdom
