= Ribsden Holt =

Coordinates: 51.372°N 0.640°W

Ribsden Holt is a former royal residence at Windlesham, Surrey, England. It was the country home of Princess Louise, Duchess of Argyll who bequeathed it to Lady Patricia Ramsay.

== History ==
The original house, set back behind a long drive, was built in the late 1870s for Henry Cadogan Rothery. Following his death in 1888. his widow Madelaine lived there until her death in October 1891. Richard Copley Christie, also an English lawyer, and his wife Mary Helen (daughter of Samuel Fletcher) bought the property the following year. After their deaths Princess Louise, Duchess of Argyll bought the property in a sale by auction in 1911. She had this property demolished and replaced with a new built in 1913. She occupied the new property until 1936, when she moved permanently to her apartment at Kensington Palace where she died in December 1939. The property was then occupied by Lady Patricia Ramsay and her husband until her death in 1974. After her death, the house passed into private ownership.
