= Frank Rose (Royal Navy officer) =

Royal Navy officer

Vice-Admiral Sir Frank Rose KCB DSO
- Born: Frank Forrester Rose; 7 February 1878; Palermo, Sicily, Italy
- Died: 3 March 1955 (aged 77); London, England
- Military career
- Allegiance: United Kingdom
- Branch: Royal Navy
- Rank: Vice-Admiral
- Commands: HMS Laurel; Commander-in-Chief, East Indies Station
- Conflicts: World War I
- Awards: Knight Commander of the Order of the Bath; Distinguished Service Order

Vice-Admiral Sir Frank Forrester Rose KCB DSO (7 February 1878 – 3 March 1955) was a Royal Navy officer who went on to be commander-in-chief of East Indies Station.

== Early life and education ==
Rose was born in Sicily, the son of British parents William Rose, a merchant, and Martha Gardner. He was educated at Stubbington House School in Fareham and on HMS Britannia.

== Naval career ==
Rose served in World War I initially as commander of HMS Laurel taking part in the Battle of Heligoland Bight in August 1914. Promoted to rear admiral in 1929, he was appointed rear admiral commanding the destroyer flotillas in the Mediterranean Fleet in 1931 and then became commander-in-chief of East Indies Station in 1934 before being replaced due to illness in 1936.

== Personal life ==
He initially married Freda Edith Gordon, daughter of Walter Alwynne Gordon. They had one son, Hugh William Mackenzie Rose, who died aboard HMS Cossack in 1941. In 1923, Sir Frank Forrester Rose remarried to Dorothy Maud Kay.

Military offices
Preceded by Sir Martin Dunbar-Nasmith	Commander-in-Chief, East Indies Station; 1934–1936	Succeeded by Sir Alexander Ramsay
