= Lady Kathleen Curzon-Herrick =

Lady Maud Kathleen Cairnes Plantagenet Hastings Curzon-Herrick (28 March 1893 – 8 February 1965) was a British novelist.

Curzon-Herrick published two novels, the first under the name Maud Cairnes. Strange Journey (1935) is the story of a body swap between an aristocrat, Lady Elizabeth, and a middle-class mother, Polly Wilkinson. It was reissued in 2022 as part of the British Library Women Writers series. Her second novel was The Disappearing Duchess (1939), published under the name Lady Herrick.

== Biography ==
Lady Kathleen Hastings was born on 28 March 1893, the daughter of Warner Francis John Plantagenet Hastings, 15th Earl of Huntingdon and Maud Margaret Wilson. She married William Montagu Curzon-Herrick on 28 July 1916 and they lived on the manor he inherited, Beaumanor Hall in Leicestershire.

Lady Kathleen Curzon-Herrick died on 8 February 1965.
