= Alexander Ramsay (Royal Navy officer) =

Royal Navy Admiral (1881–1972)

Admiral The Honourable Sir Alexander Ramsay GCVO KCB DSO
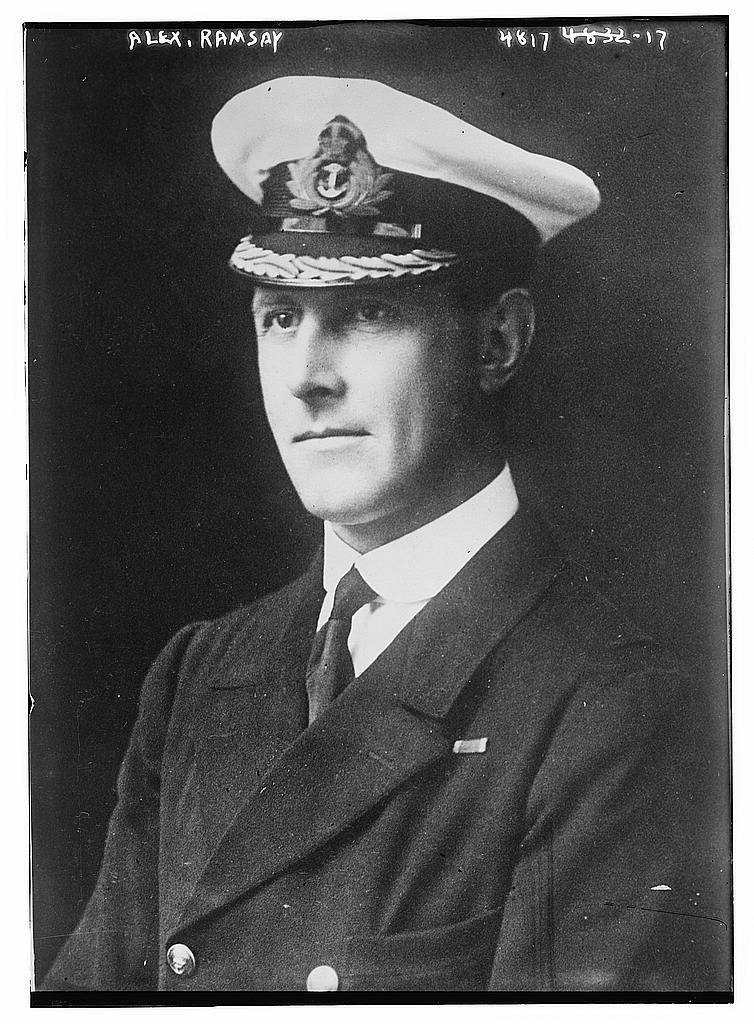
- Ramsay in 1918
- Born: 29 May 1881; London, England
- Died: 8 October 1972 (aged 91); Windlesham, Surrey, England
- Burial place: Royal Burial Ground, Frogmore
- Spouse: Princess Patricia of Connaught (m. 1919)
- Relatives: Alexander Ramsay of Mar (son); John Ramsay, 13th Earl of Dalhousie (father); Lady Ida Louise Bennet (mother)
- Military career
- Allegiance: United Kingdom
- Branch: Royal Navy
- Service years: 1894–1942
- Rank: Admiral
- Commands: East Indies Station; HMS Furious
- Conflicts: First World War; Second World War
- Awards: Knight Grand Cross of the Royal Victorian Order; Knight Commander of the Order of the Bath; Distinguished Service Order

Sir Alexander Robert Maule Ramsay (29 May 1881 – 8 October 1972) was a British Royal Navy admiral. He was the husband of Princess Patricia of Connaught, the youngest child of Prince Arthur, Duke of Connaught and Strathearn, third son of Queen Victoria. He served with distinction during the First World War. During the 1920s and 1930s, he held several important naval aviation commands.

== Early life and career ==
Alexander Robert Maule Ramsay was born on 29 May 1881 in London, as the third son of John Ramsay, 13th Earl of Dalhousie, and his wife, Lady Ida Louisa Bennet, daughter of Charles Bennet, 6th Earl of Tankerville. He entered the Royal Navy as a cadet on HMS Britannia in 1894. He first went to sea on HMS Majestic, the flagship of Admiral Sir Walter Kerr in the Channel Squadron, and was confirmed as a sub-lieutenant on 29 May 1900. In early December 1901 he was posted to the cruiser HMS Diadem, but the order was cancelled as he was instead ordered to the cruiser HMS Grafton as she left to become flagship of the Pacific Station in January 1902. He was promoted to lieutenant on 29 May 1902, and later the same year was posted to the cruiser HMS Flora as she was commissioned for the Pacific Station.

In October 1911, he became a naval aide-de-camp to the Duke of Connaught, then Governor General of Canada. He returned to active naval duty in 1913 as the gunnery officer of the battlecruiser Indefatigable in the Mediterranean.

Ramsay took part in several important naval operations of the First World War. He took part in the first phase of the bombardment of the Dardanelles forts in November 1914, and later at Gallipoli. He received the Distinguished Service Order for his conduct there. Ramsay rose to the rank of commander in late 1914 and became flag commander of the Second Squadron in 1916. He gained promotion to captain in 1919 and served as the naval attaché in Paris for the next three years.

== Marriage into the royal family ==
On 27 February 1919, the then-Captain Ramsay married Princess Patricia of Connaught at Westminster Abbey, in the presence of the entire royal family. He had proposed to her while staying with J. K. L. Ross at his fishing lodge on the bay of St. Anns, Nova Scotia.

On the day of the wedding, Princess Patricia voluntarily relinquished the title of "Princess of Great Britain and Ireland" and the style "Royal Highness", and assumed by royal warrant the style "Lady Patricia Ramsay" with precedence before the Marchionesses of England. Despite his wife's relinquishment of her royal title, the couple remained members of the British Royal Family. They attended major royal events for the next forty years, including the 1947 wedding of Princess Elizabeth and Philip Mountbatten.

They had one son, Alexander Ramsay of Mar.

== Aviation commands and flag rank ==
In 1928, Ramsay assumed command of the aircraft carrier HMS Furious in the Atlantic Fleet. He gained promotion to rear admiral in 1933 and for the next five years commanded the aircraft carriers in the fleet. He was advanced to vice-admiral in January 1936.

Ramsay served as commander-in-chief, East Indies Station, from 1936 to 1938, and then became Fifth Sea Lord and Chief of Naval Air Services. Ramsay held this post until the outbreak of the Second World War. He was promoted to admiral in December 1939 and retired at his own request in 1942.

== Honours ==
Ramsay was awarded the Distinguished Service Order (DSO) in March 1916. The citation reads, "Flag Commander to Vice-Admiral de Robeck, and has done exceptionally good service throughout the operations."

He was made a Knight Commander of the Royal Victorian Order (KCVO) in the King's Birthday Honours of 1932, and, in the New Year Honours of 1934, he was appointed a Companion of the Order of the Bath (CB), which was advanced to Knight Commander of the same Order (KCB) on 11 May 1937, "on the occasion of His Majesty's Coronation".

On 6 July 1938 he was received by King George VI on relinquishing his appointment as commander-in-chief of the East Indies Station and being appointed as Fifth Sea Lord and Chief of Naval Air Service, the King taking the opportunity to invest him with the insignia of a Knight Grand Cross of the Royal Victorian Order (GCVO).

== Death and burial ==
Ramsay died at his home, Ribsden Holt, Windlesham, Surrey, on 8 October 1972. He is buried in the Royal Burial Ground, Frogmore.

Military offices
Preceded by Sir Frank Rose	Commander-in-Chief, East Indies Station; 1936–1938	Succeeded by Sir James Somerville
Vacant Title last held by Sir Godfrey Paine	Fifth Sea Lord; 1938–1939	Succeeded by Sir Guy Royle
