= Margaret Cambridge, Marchioness of Cambridge =

British peeress (1873–1929)

The Most Honourable The Marchioness of Cambridge
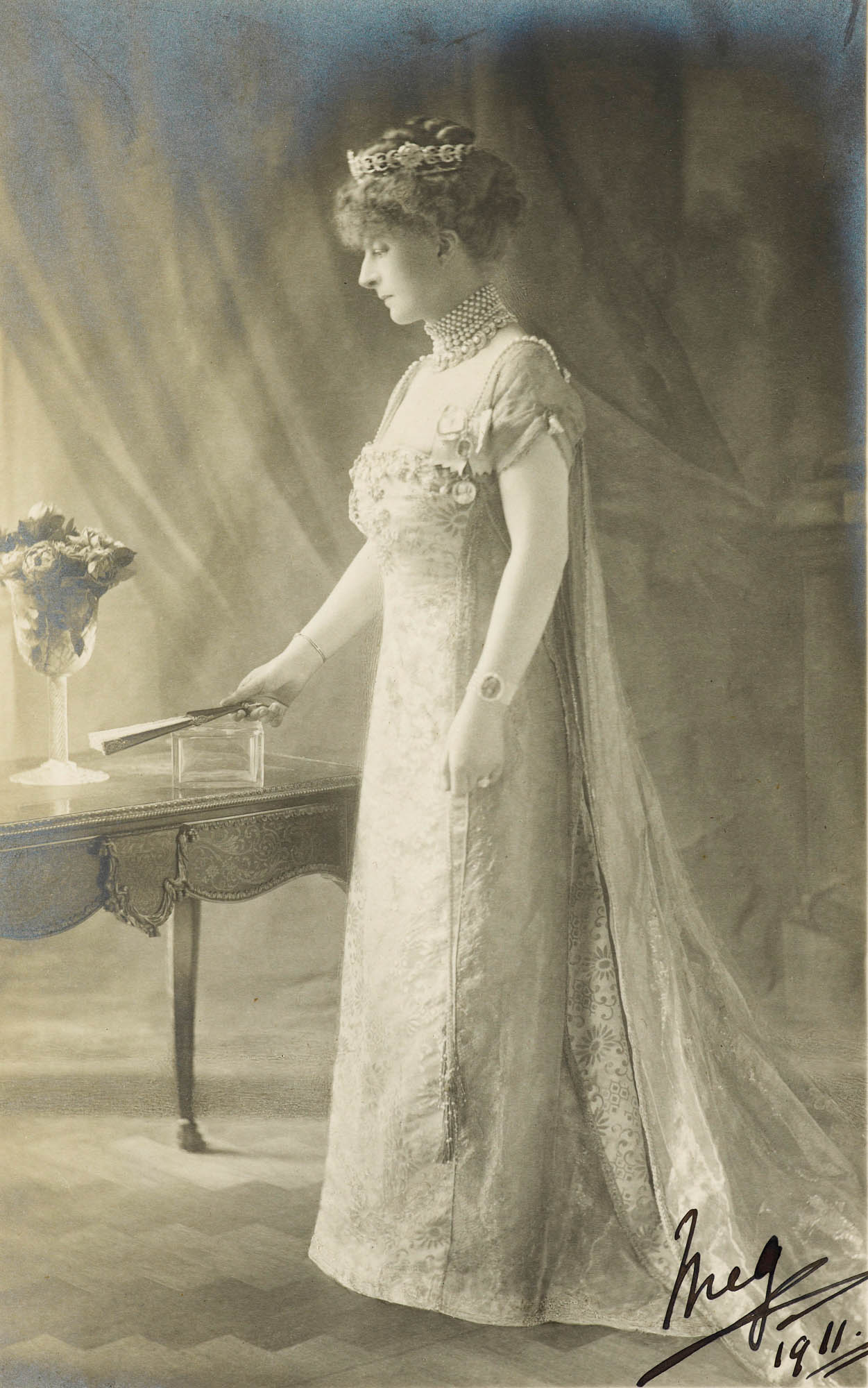
- Margaret in 1911 (then the Duchess of Teck)
- Born: Margaret Evelyn Grosvenor; 8 April 1873; Eaton Hall, Cheshire, England
- Died: 27 March 1929 (aged 55); London, England
- Buried: 30 March 1929; Royal Burial Ground, Frogmore
- Spouse: Adolphus Cambridge, 1st Marquess of Cambridge (m. 1894; died 1927)
- Issue: George Cambridge, 2nd Marquess of Cambridge; Mary Somerset, Duchess of Beaufort; Lady Helena Gibbs; Lord Frederick Cambridge
- Father: Hugh Grosvenor, 1st Duke of Westminster
- Mother: Lady Constance Sutherland-Leveson-Gower

Margaret Evelyn Cambridge, Marchioness of Cambridge (born Lady Margaret Evelyn Grosvenor; 8 April 1873 – 27 March 1929), also known after her marriage as Princess Adolphus of Teck and the Duchess of Teck, was the sixth child and third daughter of Hugh Grosvenor, 1st Duke of Westminster and the wife of Prince Adolphus (later the 1st Marquess of Cambridge)..

== Birth ==
Lady Margaret Grosvenor was born at Eaton Hall in Cheshire. Her father was the 3rd Marquess of Westminster (1st Duke of Westminster the year following her birth), the son of the 2nd Marquess of Westminster and Lady Elizabeth Mary Leveson-Gower. Her mother was Lady Constance Gertrude Leveson-Gower, the daughter of the 2nd Duke of Sutherland.

== Marriage ==
On 12 December 1894, she married Prince Adolphus of Teck at Eaton Hall in Cheshire. Prince Adolphus of Teck was the eldest son of Francis, Duke of Teck and Princess Mary Adelaide of Cambridge. He was also the younger brother of Victoria Mary, Duchess of York (later Queen Mary). Her father settled £75,000 on her upon her marriage.

After her marriage, she took on her husband's title and style and was known as Her Serene Highness Princess Adolphus of Teck. Together the couple had four children:

- Prince George of Teck, later 2nd Marquess of Cambridge, (11 October 1895 – 16 April 1981), married in 1923 Dorothy Hastings (18 May 1899 – 1 April 1988);
- Princess Mary of Teck, later Lady Mary Cambridge (12 June 1897 – 23 June 1987), married in 1923 the 10th Duke of Beaufort (4 April 1900 – 4 February 1984);
- Princess Helena of Teck, later styled Lady Helena Cambridge (23 October 1899 – 22 December 1969), married in 1919 Colonel John Evelyn Gibbs (22 December 1879 – 11 October 1932); and
- Prince Frederick of Teck, later styled Lord Frederick Cambridge (23 September 1907 – 15 May 1940).

== Duchess of Teck ==
In 1900, Prince Francis, Duke of Teck died, and Adolphus succeeded him as 2nd Duke of Teck. Margaret was now styled Her Serene Highness the Duchess of Teck. The Dukedom of Teck was a title in the Kingdom of Württemberg. In 1911, King George V awarded the Duke of Teck the style Highness as a gift on his coronation. From then on Margaret was known as Her Highness The Duchess of Teck.

Prince Adolphus saw active service with his regiment in the Second Boer War, and his wife joined him in South Africa in April 1900, travelling there on the SS Dunottar Castle with her two sisters the Marchioness of Ormonde and Lady Chesham.

== Marchioness of Cambridge ==
During the First World War, anti-German feeling in the United Kingdom led King George V to change the name of the royal house from the Germanic House of Saxe-Coburg-Gotha to the more English sounding, House of Windsor. The King also renounced all his Germanic titles for himself and all members of the British Royal Family who were British subjects.

In response to this, Adolphus renounced his title of Duke of Teck in the Kingdom of Württemberg and the style His Highness. Adolphus, along with his brother, Prince Alexander of Teck, adopted the name Cambridge, after their grandfather, Prince Adolphus, Duke of Cambridge.

He was subsequently created Marquess of Cambridge, Earl of Eltham, and Viscount Northallerton in the Peerage of the United Kingdom. Margaret from then on became the Marchioness of Cambridge. Their elder son took the title Earl of Eltham as a courtesy title. The younger children became Lord/Lady (Christian Name) Cambridge.

After World War I the couple made their home in Shropshire at Shotton Hall, near Shrewsbury, England, until after her husband's death in 1927. His elder son, the Earl of Eltham, succeeded him as Marquess of Cambridge. Lady Cambridge survived him by two years, and died of pneumonia on 27 March 1929 in London. She was buried beside her husband at the Royal Burial Ground, Frogmore.
