= Adolphus Cambridge, 1st Marquess of Cambridge =

British peer and soldier (1868–1927)

Lieutenant-Colonel The Most Honourable The Marquess of Cambridge GCB GCVO CMG KStJ ADC JP DL
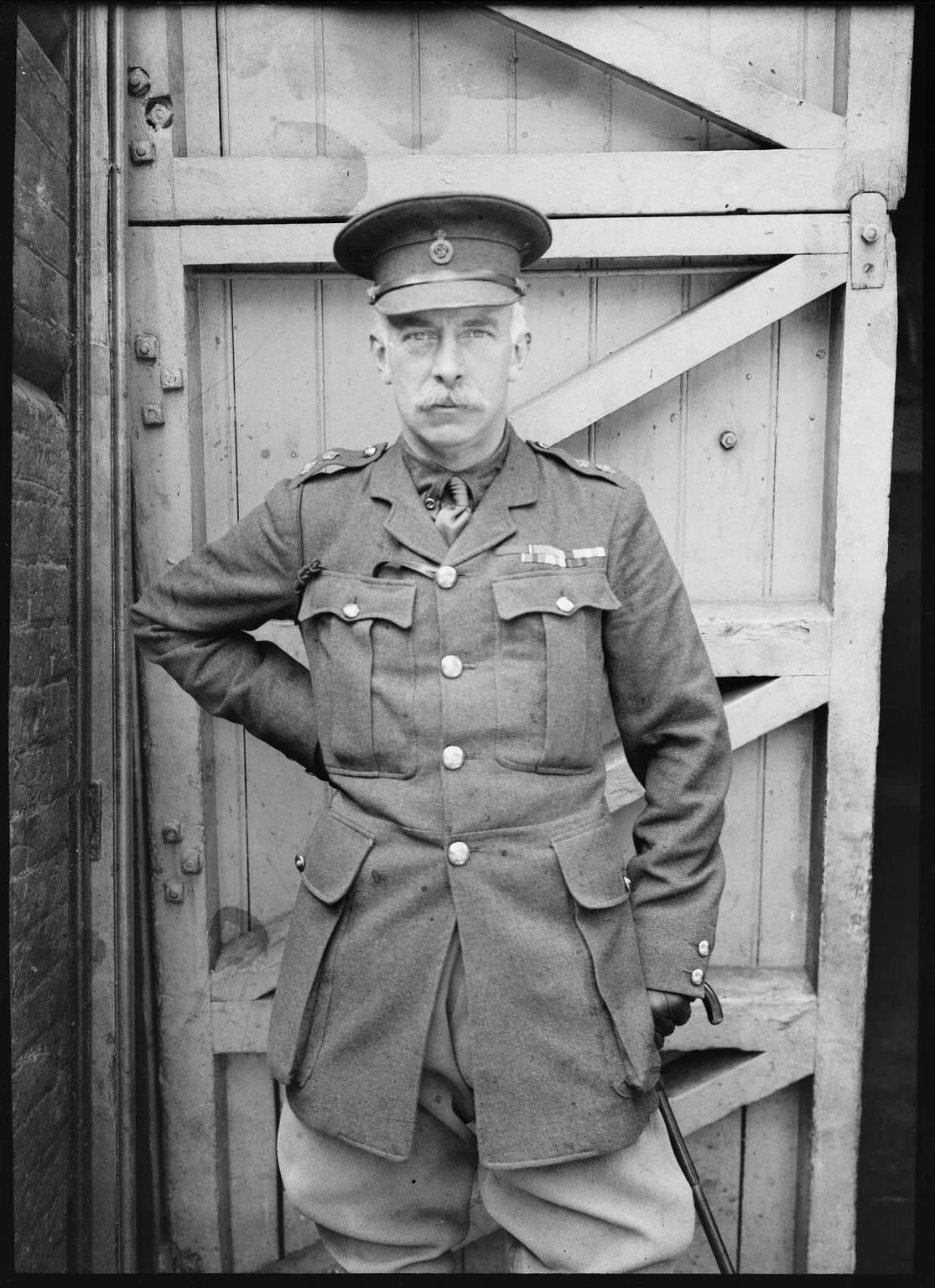
- Cambridge before 1925
- Born: Prince Adolphus of Teck; 13 August 1868; Kensington Palace, London, England
- Died: 24 October 1927 (aged 59); Shrewsbury, Shropshire, England
- Resting place: 29 October 1927; St George's Chapel, Windsor Castle; 23 October 1928; Royal Burial Ground, Frogmore
- Spouse: Lady Margaret Grosvenor (m. 1894)
- Children: George Cambridge, 2nd Marquess of Cambridge; Mary Somerset, Duchess of Beaufort; Lady Helena Gibbs; Lord Frederick Cambridge
- Parents: Francis, Duke of Teck (father); Princess Mary Adelaide of Cambridge (mother)
- Military career
- Allegiance: United Kingdom
- Branch: British Army
- Service years: 1888–1919
- Rank: Lieutenant colonel
- Conflicts: Boer War; First World War

Adolphus Cambridge, 1st Marquess of Cambridge (Adolphus Charles Alexander Albert Edward George Philip Louis Ladislaus; 13 August 1868 – 24 October 1927), born Prince Adolphus of Teck and later the Duke of Teck, was a relative of the British royal family, a great-grandson of King George III and younger brother of Queen Mary. In 1900, he succeeded his father as Duke of Teck in the Kingdom of Württemberg. He relinquished his German titles in 1917 to become Marquess of Cambridge.

== Early life ==
Adolphus of Teck was born on 13 August 1868 at Kensington Palace, London. His father was Prince Francis, Duke of Teck, the eldest son of Duke Alexander of Württemberg and Countess Claudine Rhédey von Kis-Rhéde (created the Countess von Hohenstein). His mother was the Duchess of Teck (formerly Princess Mary Adelaide of Cambridge), the youngest daughter of Prince Adolphus, Duke of Cambridge, and Princess Augusta of Hesse-Kassel, granddaughter of George III. Adolphus was styled His Serene Highness Prince Adolphus of Teck at birth. With a string of nine Christian names, among his immediate family he was always known as "Dolly", a pet form of 'Adolphus'. He was educated at Wellington College in Berkshire.

== Early military career ==
Adolphus was a cavalry officer, following in the footsteps of his father, both of his grandfathers, and his maternal uncle. He received his education at Wellington College, before entering the Royal Military College, Sandhurst. At the age of 19, in April 1888, he was commissioned into the British Army as a second lieutenant in the 17th Lancers, the regiment of his maternal uncle, the Duke of Cambridge, who was the commander-in-chief of the British Army from 1856 to 1895. He was promoted lieutenant in January 1893, and transferred to the 1st Life Guards as a captain in June 1895.

== Marriage ==
On 12 December 1894, at Eaton Hall, he married Lady Margaret Evelyn Grosvenor (9 April 1873 – 27 March 1929), the daughter of Hugh Grosvenor, 1st Duke of Westminster. The couple had four children:

- Prince George of Teck, later 2nd Marquess of Cambridge (11 October 1895 – 16 April 1981); married 1923 Dorothy Hastings (18 May 1899 – 1 April 1988). They had one daughter.
- Princess Mary of Teck, later Lady Mary Cambridge (12 June 1897 – 23 June 1987); married 1923 the 10th Duke of Beaufort (4 April 1900 – 4 February 1984). They had no children.
- Princess Helena of Teck, later Lady Helena Cambridge (23 October 1899 – 22 December 1969); married 1919 Colonel John Evelyn Gibbs (22 December 1879 – 11 October 1932). They had no children.
- Prince Frederick of Teck, later Lord Frederick Cambridge (23 September 1907 – 15 May 1940). Killed in action in Leuven, Belgium during World War II. Never married or had children.

== Duke of Teck and later military career ==
In January 1900, Adolphus succeeded his father as Duke of Teck. The new duke served with his regiment during the Boer War 1899–1900, for which he was promoted Brevet major in November 1900. When his regiment was quartered at Combermere Barracks from early 1903, the King allowed Adolphus and his wife to stay at Henry III's Tower at Windsor Castle. He was later a transport officer in the Household Cavalry. In February 1904, he was promoted to the temporary rank of lieutenant-colonel and appointed a temporary military attaché at the British embassy in Vienna. His appointment as military attaché was confirmed in April 1906, and he received a staff posting the same month. He was promoted to the substantive rank of major in December 1906, and was raised to brevet lieutenant-colonel in November 1910.

With an Order in Council dated 9 June 1911, his brother-in-law King George V, as a gift to mark his own Coronation, granted his cousin the style His Highness, which echoed the gift of the King's grandmother, Queen Victoria, to the Duke's father. The same year he was made a Knight Grand Cross of the Order of the Bath (GCB). From other nations he received the grand cross of the Order of the Red Eagle of Prussia and the Order of the Star of Romania.

He was appointed Honorary Colonel of the 8th Battalion, London Regiment, known as the Post Office Rifles in 1912, relinquishing the position in 1923.

Teck was president of the RSPCA from 1910 to 1916. From 1914 to his death he was Governor and Constable of Windsor Castle.

With the outbreak of the First World War, he returned to active duty, joining his regiment, 1st Life Guards (possibly at Jabeeke Belgium) on 9 October 1914, returning to base (sick) on 19 October 1914. He first served as assistant military secretary at the War Office, and from December 1915 as military secretary to the commander-in-chief of the British Expeditionary Forces (BEF) in France, Sir Douglas Haig, with the temporary rank of brigadier general. He received from allied nations the Belgian Order of Leopold (Grand Cordon) and Croix de guerre, as well as the French Legion of Honour (Grand Officer).

Following ill-health he was placed on half-pay in July 1916, and retired pay in 1919.

== Marquess of Cambridge ==
During the First World War, anti-German sentiment in the United Kingdom led Teck's brother-in-law, King George V, to change the name of the Royal House from the Germanic House of Saxe-Coburg-Gotha to the more English-sounding House of Windsor. The King also renounced all his Germanic titles for himself and all members of the British Royal Family who were British subjects.

In response to this, Teck renounced, through a Royal Warrant from the King, dated 14 July 1917, his title of Duke of Teck in the Kingdom of Württemberg and the style His Highness. Adolphus, along with his brother, Prince Alexander of Teck, adopted the name Cambridge, after their grandfather, Prince Adolphus, Duke of Cambridge.

He was subsequently created Marquess of Cambridge, Earl of Eltham, and Viscount Northallerton all in the Peerage of the United Kingdom. His elder son took the title Earl of Eltham as a courtesy title. His younger children became Lord/Lady (Christian Name) Cambridge.

Vera Bate Lombardi, Coco Chanel's muse and PR representative, was rumoured to be Adolphus' illegitimate daughter. Hal Vaughan, in his 2012 biography of Coco Chanel ('Sleeping with the Enemy: Coco Chanel's Secret War', p. 42), describes Vera Bate Lombardi as a 'cousin and childhood friend' of Edward, Prince of Wales.

Lord Cambridge made his home in Shropshire after World War I at Shotton Hall, Harmer Hill, near Shrewsbury. He was active in social life in the county, of which he became a Justice of the Peace and Deputy Lieutenant in 1923, and Treasurer of the Royal Salop Infirmary at Shrewsbury in 1925. He hosted visits made by his sister to the county, the last in his lifetime being a public visit to Shrewsbury and other parts of Shropshire in August 1927.

== Death ==
Lord Cambridge died, aged fifty-nine, after an intestinal operation in October 1927 at a Shrewsbury nursing home, while preparations were being made for another public royal visit to the town (which was consequently cancelled) by his nephew, the Prince of Wales (later Edward VIII). He was first buried at St George's Chapel at Windsor Castle and later transferred to the Royal Burial Ground, Frogmore. His elder son, the Earl of Eltham, succeeded him as Marquess of Cambridge.

== Titles, styles, honours and arms ==
=== Titles and styles ===
- 13 August 1868 – 21 January 1900: His Serene Highness Prince Adolphus of Teck
- 21 January 1900 – 9 June 1911: His Serene Highness The Duke of Teck
- 9 June 1911 – 14 July 1917: His Highness The Duke of Teck
- 14 July 1917 – 7 November 1917: Colonel Sir Adolphus Cambridge
- 7 November 1917 – 24 October 1927: The Most Honourable The Marquess of Cambridge

=== Honours ===
- United Kingdom:
  - KStJ: Knight of Grace of the Most Venerable Order of St John
  - KCVO: Knight Commander of the Royal Victorian Order, 30 June 1897
  - GCVO: Knight Grand Cross of the Royal Victorian Order, 27 January 1901
  - CMG: Companion of the Most Distinguished Order of St Michael and St George
  - ADC: Personal Aide-de-Camp, 3 June 1910
  - GCB: Knight Grand Cross (civil division) of the Most Honourable Order of the Bath, 19 June 1911
- Württemberg: Grand Cross of the Order of the Württemberg Crown, 1882
- Mecklenburg: Grand Cross of the House Order of the Wendish Crown, with Crown in Ore, 19 July 1902
- Grand Duchy of Hesse: Knight of the Grand Ducal Hessian Order of the Golden Lion, 7 October 1903
- (Austrian Empire) (Kingdom of Hungary) Austria-Hungary:
  - Grand Cross of the Imperial Austrian Order of Franz Joseph, 1904
  - Knight of the Imperial Order of the Iron Crown, 1st Class, 1908
- Belgium: Grand Cordon of the Order of Leopold, 24 February 1916
- France: Commander's Cross of the National Order of the Legion of Honour, 9 December 1916

=== Arms ===
Coat of arms of Adolphus Cambridge, 1st Marquess of Cambridge
Coronet Coronet of a Marquess Crest A Dog's Head and Neck lozengy bendy sinister Sable and Or, langued Gules. Escutcheon Quarterly: 1st & 4th grand-quarters, The Royal Arms as borne by King George III, differenced by a Label of three points Argent, the centre point charged with a Cross Gules, and each of the other points with two Hearts in pale Gules (Prince Adolphus, Duke of Cambridge); 2nd & 3rd grand-quarters, Or, three Stags' Attires fesswise in pale, the points of each Attire to the sinister Sable, impaling Or three Lions passant in pale Sable, langued Gules, the dexter forepaws Gules; over all an Inescutcheon lozengy bendy sinister Sable and Or (Teck). Supporters Dexter: a Lion Sable, the dexter forepaw Gules. Sinister: a Stag Proper. Motto FEARLESS AND FAITHFUL Orders Order of the Bath (knight grand cross) Symbolism The second and third quarterings represent his descent from the Dukes of Württemberg

== Ancestry ==
Ancestors of Adolphus Cambridge, 1st Marquess of Cambridge

8. Duke Louis of Württemberg
4. Duke Alexander of Württemberg
9. Princess Henriette of Nassau-Weilburg
2. Francis, Duke of Teck
10. Count László Rhédey von Kis-Rhéde
5. Countess Claudine Rhédey von Kis-Rhéde
11. Baroness Ágnes Inczédy von Nagy-Várad
1. Adolphus Cambridge, 1st Marquess of Cambridge
12. George III of the United Kingdom
6. Prince Adolphus, Duke of Cambridge
13. Duchess Charlotte of Mecklenburg-Strelitz
3. Princess Mary Adelaide of Cambridge
14. Prince Frederick of Hesse-Kassel
7. Princess Augusta of Hesse-Kassel
15. Princess Caroline of Nassau-Usingen

== Family tree ==
Family tree of Dukes and Marquesses of Cambridge

King James VI and I (1566–1625)
Elizabeth Stuart (1596–1662); Queen of Bohemia	King Charles I (1600–1649)
Duke of Gloucester (4th creation) and Earl of Cambridge (5th creation), 1659
Sophia of Hanover (1630–1714)	King Charles II (1630–1685)	King James VII and II (1633–1701)	Henry Stuart (1640–1660); Duke of Gloucester, etc.
Dukedom of Gloucester (4th creation) and Earl of Cambridge (5th creation) extinct, 1660
Duke of Cambridge (1st creation), Earl of Cambridge (6th creation), and Baron of Dauntsey (1st creation), 1664	Duke of Cambridge (2nd creation), Earl of Cambridge (7th creation), and Baron of Dauntsey (2nd creation), 1667
King George I (1660–1727)	Charles Stuart (1660–1661) styled Duke of Cambridge	James Stuart (1663–1667); Duke of Cambridge, etc.	Edgar Stuart (1667–1671); Duke of Cambridge, etc.	Charles Stuart (1677) styled Duke of Cambridge
Dukedom of Cambridge (1st creation), Earldom of Cambridge (6th creation), and Barony of Dauntsey (1st creation) extinct, 1667	Dukedom of Cambridge (2nd creation), Earldom of Cambridge (7th creation), and Barony of Dauntsey (2nd creation) extinct, 1671
Duke of Cambridge (3rd creation) and Marquess of Cambridge (1st creation), 1706
Prince George (1683–1760); Duke of Cambridge, etc. later King George II
Dukedom of Cambridge (3rd creation) and Marquessate of Cambridge (1st creation) merged with the Crown, 1727
Prince Frederick (1707–1751); Prince of Wales
George III (1738–1820)
Duke of Cambridge (4th creation), Earl of Tipperary and Baron Culloden (1st creation), 1801
Prince Edward (1767–1820); Duke of Kent and Strathearn	Prince Adolphus (1774–1850); 1st Duke of Cambridge, etc.
Queen Victoria (1819–1901)	Prince George (1819–1904); 2nd Duke of Cambridge, etc.	Princess Mary Adelaide of Cambridge (1833–1897)
Dukedom of Cambridge (4th creation), Earldom of Tipperary, and Barony Culloden (1st creation extinct, 1904
King Edward VII (1841–1910)
Marquess of Cambridge (2nd creation), Earl of Eltham (1st creation), and Viscount Northallerton, 1917
King George V (1865–1936)	Mary of Teck (1867–1953)	Adolphus Cambridge (1868–1927); Duke of Teck, 1st Marquess of Cambridge, etc.
King Edward VIII (1894–1972)	King George VI (1895–1952)	George Francis Hugh Cambridge (1895–1981); 2nd Marquess of Cambridge, etc.
Marquessate of Cambridge (2nd creation), Earldom of Eltham (2nd creation), Viscountcy Northallerton extinct, 1981
Queen Elizabeth II (1926–2022)
King Charles III (b. 1948)
Duke of Cambridge (5th creation), Earl of Strathearn (Mountbatten-Windsor line), and Baron Carrickfergus, 2011
Prince William (b. 1982); Prince of Wales, Duke of Cornwall, Duke of Rothesay, Duke of Cambridge, etc., Earl of Chester
Prince George of Wales (b. 2013)
Heir apparent to the Dukedom of Cambridge

== Footnotes ==
German nobility
Preceded by Prince Francis of Teck	Duke of Teck; 1900–1917	Title relinquished
Peerage of the United Kingdom
New creation	Marquess of Cambridge; 1917–1927	Succeeded by George Cambridge
