= George Cambridge, 2nd Marquess of Cambridge =

British aristocrat (1895–1981)

Major The Most Honourable The Marquess of Cambridge GCVO
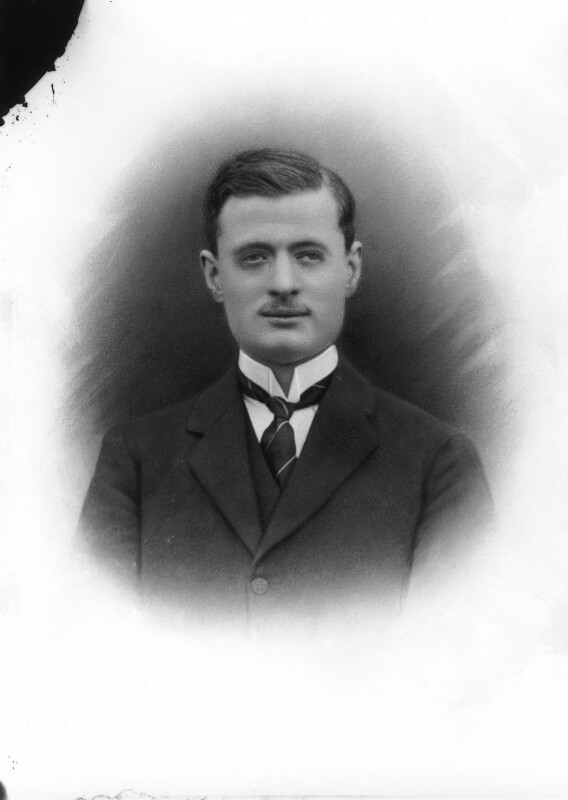
- Cambridge in 1928

Marquess of Cambridge
- Tenure: 1927–1981
- Predecessor: Adolphus Cambridge
- Born: Prince George Francis Hugh of Teck; 11 October 1895; Grosvenor House, London, England
- Died: 16 April 1981 (aged 85); Little Abington, Cambridgeshire, England
- Buried: 23 April 1981; Royal Burial Ground, Frogmore
- Spouse: Dorothy Hastings (m. 1923)
- Issue: Lady Mary Whitley
- Father: Adolphus Cambridge, 1st Marquess of Cambridge
- Mother: Lady Margaret Grosvenor

George Francis Hugh Cambridge, 2nd Marquess of Cambridge, GCVO (11 October 1895 – 16 April 1981), known as Prince George of Teck until 1917 and as Earl of Eltham from 1917 to 1927, was a relative of the British royal family, a great-great-grandson of King George III and nephew of Queen Mary and King George V. He was also nephew to the 1st Earl of Athlone. He was the elder son of the 1st Marquess of Cambridge, formerly the Duke of Teck, and his wife, the former Lady Margaret Grosvenor.

== Early life ==
Born at Grosvenor House, the home of his maternal grandfather, the 1st Duke of Westminster, he was styled His Serene Highness Prince George of Teck from birth. On his father's side, he was descended from King George III and—morganatically—from the Royal House of Württemberg. In June 1917, at the request of George V, his father relinquished the titles, styles, and designations, "Highness", "Duke of Teck" and "of Teck" in the Kingdom of Württemberg and the German Empire, and assumed the surname Cambridge by Royal Licence and Warrant. The former Duke of Teck was subsequently created Marquess of Cambridge, Earl of Eltham and Viscount Northallerton in the Peerage of the United Kingdom. Prince George became George Cambridge and was styled Earl of Eltham as a courtesy title. He succeeded his father as 2nd Marquess of Cambridge on 24 October 1927. He was appointed a Knight Commander of the Royal Victorian Order in the 1927 Birthday Honours and was promoted to Knight Grand Cross in June 1935.

== Education and career ==
Prince George of Teck was educated at Ludgrove School and Eton College followed by Magdalen College, Oxford. He joined the Reserve Regiment of the 1st Life Guards during World War I and served as an aide-de-camp on the Personal Staff in 1918–1919.

In the inter-war years, he served with the Territorial Army as a lieutenant in the Shropshire Yeomanry from 1921, then as captain in the 16th Battalion, London Regiment from 1929 to 1932.

At the outbreak of World War II he mobilised as Captain with the Royal Army Service Corps and served in France, rising to rank of Major.

In 1929, he became a director of Coutts & Company, a banking firm. This made him the second member of the British royal family (albeit, a very minor one) to pursue a career in the City of London. He remained with the firm until his retirement in 1951.

== Personal life ==
On 10 April 1923 at Beaumanor Hall, he married Dorothy Isabel Westenra Hastings (18 May 1899 – 1 April 1988), daughter of The Hon. Osmund William Toone Westenra Hastings, a younger son of the 14th Earl of Huntingdon, and his wife Mary Caroline Campbell Tarratt, daughter of Daniel Fox Tarratt.

Lord and Lady Cambridge regularly attended major royal occasions, although they did not carry out royal duties. Lord Cambridge participated in the coronations of George V, George VI, and Elizabeth II. For many years he served as Royal Trustee of the British Museum.

Lord Cambridge died on 16 April 1981 in Little Abington, and was buried in the Royal Burial Ground, Frogmore. His peerages became extinct. His brother, Lord Frederick Cambridge, had died while fighting in Belgium during World War II.

=== Issue ===
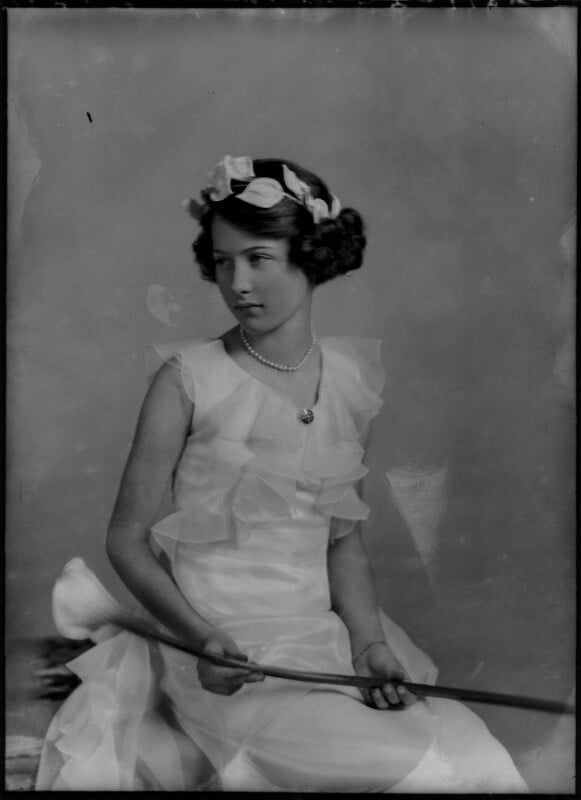
Lady Mary Cambridge in 1937

Lord and Lady Cambridge had one daughter: Mary Ilona Margaret (24 September 1924 – 13 December 1999).

Lady Mary was born at Lowndes Square, Kensington, when her parents were still known as Earl and Countess of Eltham. Lord and Lady Eltham lived on the edge of Hyde Park, London, near Lord Eltham's cousin and his wife, the Duke and Duchess of York. The young Lady Mary was educated at home under the supervision of her grandmother, nanny, and governess. Often, she would be invited to play with her second cousins, the Princesses Elizabeth and Margaret of York, who lived near her by Hyde Park (specifically at 145 Piccadilly). When they were in London, she would also play with George and Gerald Lascelles, the children of the Princess Royal, who were her second cousins. On 29 November 1934, she was a bridesmaid at the marriage of the Duke of Kent to Princess Marina of Greece and Denmark.

When not in London and for the duration of the London Blitz, the Cambridges sent Lady Mary to stay with her maternal grandmother, Mary Caroline Campbell Tarratt (died 1955), widow of Captain the Hon. Osmond Westenra Hastings (1873–1933), at Hodcott House, their country house near West Ilsley in Berkshire. Her parents remained in London, as her father was a director of Coutts & Company, a banking firm, in the city. When Mary was older, toward the end of the war, she became a volunteer nurse in the blitzed area of London.

On 9 November 1951 at Kirtling, Newmarket, Lady Mary married Peter Whitley (22 October 1923 Singapore – 25 January 2003) of Leighland House, Roadwater, Watchet, Somerset, a son of Sir Norman Henry Pownall Whitley MC. After their marriage, the couple was given the Lord Cambridge's London townhouse in St. James's Square. Peter pursued a career with Distillers Company and became a managing director before his retirement in 1985. The couple had two children:

1. Sarah Elizabeth Whitley (born 30 November 1954), who married Timothy Felton (born 8 March 1954) on 18 September 1982 and has two daughters: Emily Ilona Felton (born 21 July 1985) and Chloë Amelia Felton (born 17 June 1987), the latest descendants of the Marquesses of Cambridge.
2. Charles Francis Peter Whitley (born 10 September 1961), who married Diana Hewitt (born 8 November 1953) on 25 May 1991. They have no children.

Lady Mary regularly attended major royal occasions, but like her father, she did not carry out royal duties. Mary was a junior bridesmaid at the 1934 wedding of her father's first cousin, Prince George, Duke of Kent to Princess Marina of Greece and Denmark. On 20 November 1947, she was also a bridesmaid at the wedding of Princess Elizabeth to Philip Mountbatten. She participated in the coronations of both King George VI and Queen Elizabeth II and attended the Trooping the Colour every year between 1950 and 1999 (excluding 1955, when it was cancelled due to a rail strike). She attended the following royal marriages: Princess Margaret to Antony Armstrong-Jones, created Earl of Snowdon (1960); the Prince of Wales to Lady Diana Spencer (1981); Princess Anne to Captain Mark Phillips (1973) and Princess Anne's subsequent marriage to Commander Timothy Laurence (1992); Prince Andrew, Duke of York, to Sarah Ferguson (1986).

== Arms ==
Coat of arms of George Cambridge, 2nd Marquess of Cambridge
Coronet Coronet of a Marquess Crest A Dog's Head and Neck lozengy bendy sinister Sable and Or, langued Gules. Escutcheon Quarterly: 1st & 4th grand-quarters, The Royal Arms as borne by King George III, differenced by a Label of three-points Argent, the centre point charged with a Cross Gules, and each of the other points with two Hearts in pale Gules; 2nd & 3rd grand-quarters, Or, three Stags' Attires fesswise in pale, the points of each Attire to the sinister Sable, impaling Or three Lions passant in pale Sable, langued Gules, the dexter forepaws Gules; over all an Inescutcheon lozengy bendy sinister Sable and Or (Teck). Supporters Dexter: a Lion Sable, the dexter forepaw Gules. Sinister: a Stag Proper. Motto FEARLESS AND FAITHFUL Orders Royal Victorian Order (Knight Grand Cross) Symbolism The second and third quarterings represent his descent from the Dukes of Württemberg

Peerage of the United Kingdom
Preceded by Adolphus Cambridge	Marquess of Cambridge; 1927–1981	Extinct
