= Coronation of George VI and Elizabeth =

1937 coronation in the United Kingdom

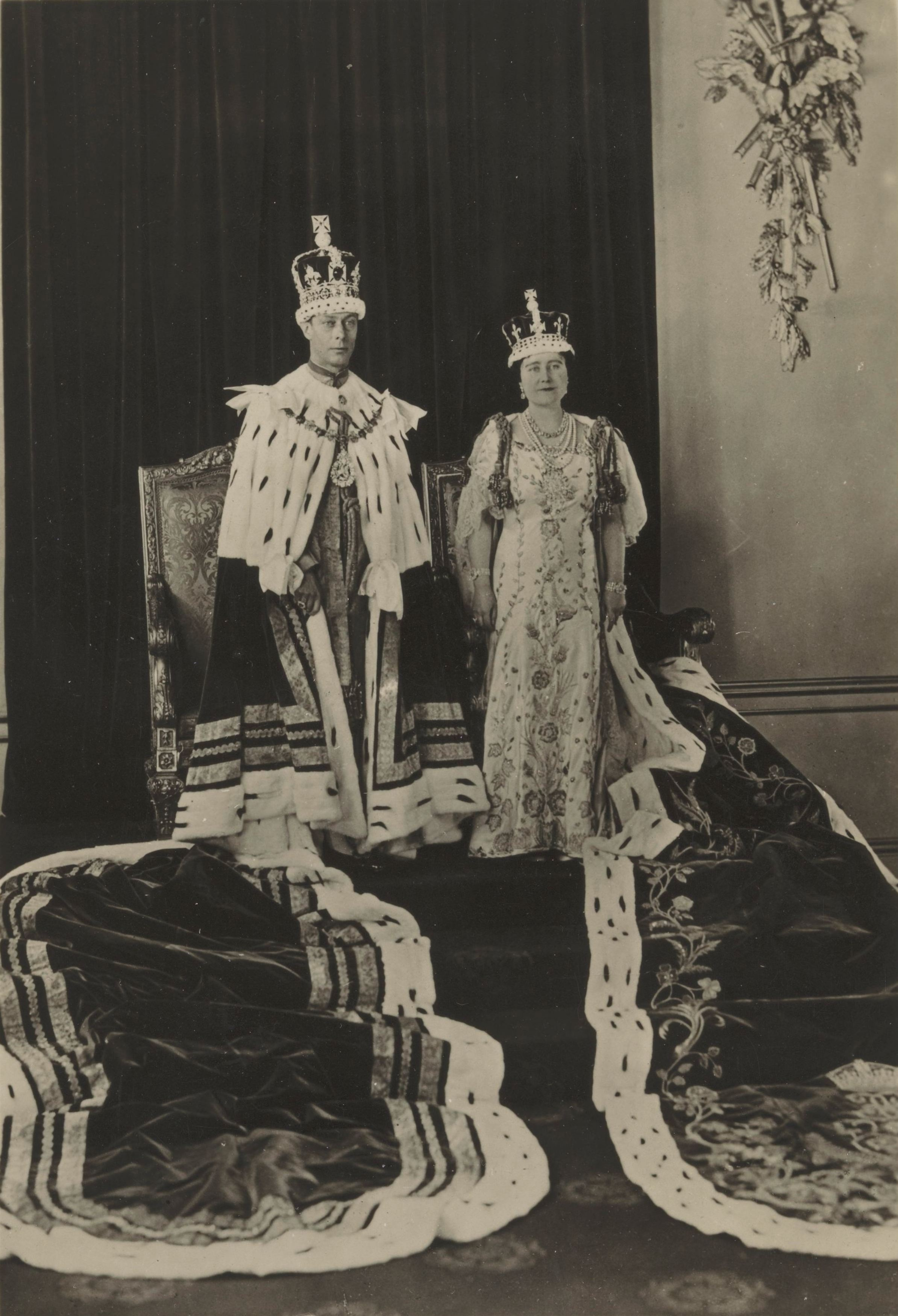
- King George VI and Queen Elizabeth in their coronation robes, 1937
- Date: 12 May 1937; 89 years ago
- Location: Westminster Abbey, London, England
- Budget: £454,000
- Participants: King George VI; Queen Elizabeth; Great Officers of State; Archbishops and Bishops Assistant of the Church of England; Garter Principal King of Arms; Peers of the Realm; Mistress of the Robes

The coronation of George VI and his wife, Elizabeth, as king and queen of the United Kingdom and the Dominions of the British Commonwealth, Emperor and Empress of India took place at Westminster Abbey, London, on Wednesday 12 May 1937. George VI ascended the throne upon the abdication of his brother, Edward VIII, on 11 December 1936, three days before his 41st birthday. Edward's coronation had been planned for 12 May and it was decided to continue with his brother and sister-in-law's coronation on the same date.

Although the music included a range of new anthems and the ceremony underwent some alterations to include the Dominions, it remained a largely conservative affair and closely followed the ceremonial of the coronation of George V and Mary in 1911. The ceremony began with the anointing of the King, symbolising his spiritual entry into kingship, and then his crowning and enthronement, representing his assumption of temporal powers and responsibilities. The peers of the realm then paid homage to the King before a shorter and simpler ceremony was conducted for the Queen's coronation. The return procession to Buckingham Palace was over six miles (ten kilometres) in length, making it the longest coronation procession up to that time; crowds of people lined the streets to watch it, over 32,000 soldiers and sailors took part, and 20,000 police officers lined the route. The coronation was commemorated by the issuing of official medals, coinage and stamps, by military parades across the Empire, and by numerous unofficial celebrations, including street parties and the production of memorabilia.

The event was designed to be not only a sacred anointing and formal crowning, but also a public spectacle, which was also planned as a display of the British Empire. May 1937 included a programme of royal events lasting nearly the entire month to commemorate and mark the occasion. As a preliminary to the coronation, guests from across the Empire and around the world assembled at Buckingham Palace and official receptions were held to welcome them; among those attending were Indian princes and, for the first time, native African royalty. For the event itself, the prime ministers of almost every Dominion took part in the procession to the abbey, while representatives of nearly every country attended. Contingents from most colonies and each Dominion participated in the return procession through London's streets.

The media played an important part in broadcasting this show of pageantry and imperialism to the Empire. The coronation procession was an important event in the history of television, being the country's first major outside broadcast, although the ceremony inside the abbey was not televised. It was also the first coronation to be filmed, as well as the first to be broadcast on radio.

== Background ==
=== Accession ===
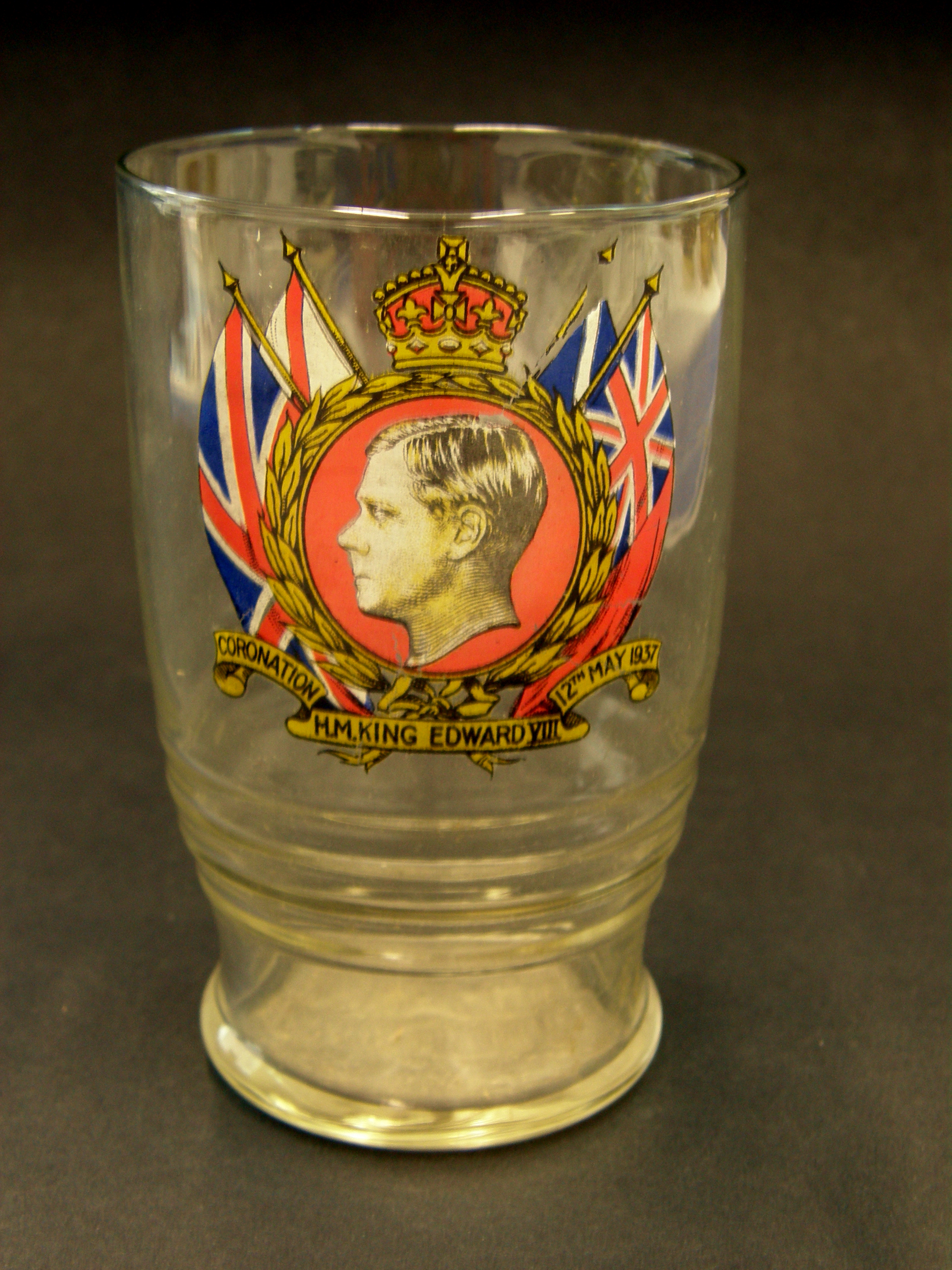
A commemorative glass tumbler, produced for the coronation of King Edward VIII, planned for 12 May 1937

In January 1936, King George V died and his eldest son, Edward VIII, succeeded him as king-emperor of the British Empire. He was unmarried at that time, but the American socialite Wallis Simpson had accompanied him on numerous social occasions in years leading up to 1936; she was married to the shipping executive Ernest Aldrich Simpson and had previously been divorced. The relationship had not been reported in the British press, but was receiving considerable media attention in the United States; it was controversial due to her being divorced with her previous spouse still living, a status considered incompatible with the King's position as the nominal head of the Church of England, which did not at that time permit remarriage after divorce if the previous spouse was still living.

In October 1936 Simpson filed for divorce (which, when final, would result in two previous spouses still living), and the King informed the Prime Minister, Stanley Baldwin, that he intended to marry her. Baldwin and several leading imperial administrators advised the King that popular opinion in the dominions was hostile to the proposed marriage; at home, the King also faced opposition from the Church of England and from factions in Parliament. The widespread unwillingness to accept Simpson as the King's consort, and Edward's refusal to give her up, led to his abdication in December 1936.

He was succeeded by his next younger brother, George VI. Before his accession, George had been known as Prince Albert, Duke of York; his regnal name was chosen in honour of his late father. In 1923, he had married Lady Elizabeth Bowes-Lyon, the daughter of the Earl of Strathmore and Kinghorne.

=== Coronation ceremony ===
Although the reign of the British monarch begins on his or her succession to the throne, the coronation service marks their formal investiture. In 1937, the ceremony was organised by a Coronation Committee, established by the Privy Council and chaired by the Lord President of the Council, a political appointment; its central component, the Executive Committee, was chaired by the Duke of Norfolk, who inherited the office of Earl Marshal, which carries with it, by convention, the responsibility for the organisation and coordination of the coronation ceremony.

== Preparation ==
=== Planning ===
The Coronation Committee had been delayed when it met for the first time on 24 June 1936: Ramsay MacDonald, the Lord President of the Council, met the Duke of Norfolk to discuss the proceedings; MacDonald would chair the Coronation Committee as a whole, and the Duke would chair the Executive Committee. While Edward VIII was away, cruising on the Nahlin with Wallis Simpson, his brother, Albert, Duke of York (the future George VI) sat in his place on the committees. Edward VIII had initially been reluctant to have a coronation at all (asking the Archbishop of Canterbury whether it could be dispensed with), but conceded that a shorter service would be acceptable; his desire for a lower-key event led to the planned abandonment of the royal procession through London the following day, the thanksgiving service at St Paul's Cathedral and the dinner with London dignitaries.

After the abdication of Edward VIII, the coronation committee continued to plan the event for George VI with minimal disruption; according to Sir Roy Strong, at the next meeting after the abdication "no reference was made at all to the change of sovereign, everything immediately being assumed to have been done for the new king." After the abdication, though, many of the traditional elements that Edward VIII cared less for were restored, with Queen Mary taking an interest in the design of furniture and insisting on a more traditional appearance; indeed, much of the service and the furnishings were to closely resemble those of the 1911 coronation of George V.

=== Archbishop of Canterbury ===
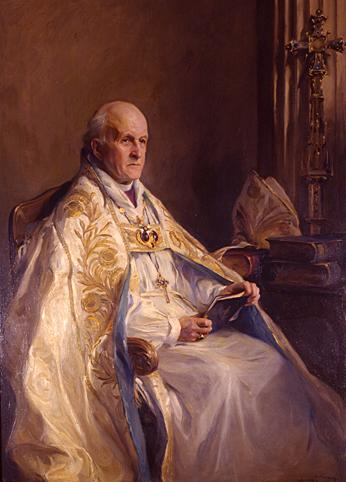
Archbishop Cosmo Lang, painted in 1937 with his coronation cope and mitre by Philip de László

Although the Executive Committee was chaired by the Earl Marshal, the Archbishop of Canterbury, Cosmo Lang, was also a driving force behind the preparations for the 1937 coronation; and many of the decisions about the order of service were made by or with him. He was an ex officio member of both the Executive Committee and the Coronation Committee, which dealt with the detail and, as such, he attended all of the rehearsals. He tended to take a leading role in the planning process, becoming a key mediator when queries arose, and dealing with questions of how the service should be broadcast by the media. Lang also spoke to the nation through the BBC services in the run-up to Coronation Day; he saw the Coronation as an opportunity for the spiritual renewal of the nation, and he organised a campaign of evangelism called Recall to Religion, which he launched on 27 December 1936 with an address on BBC radio. He was also keen to ensure that the King and Queen understood the religious nuances of the service, and held two meetings with the couple beforehand.

The Archbishop met the King and Queen on the evening before their coronation, running through the ceremony and explaining the most important parts. He was also concerned about King George's stutter and discussed the matter with Lord Dawson of Penn and Lord Wigram; Lionel Logue was then the King's speech therapist and the Archbishop discussed replacing him, but decided to monitor the King's improvement and Logue remained his therapist. As it happened, the King delivered his speech without stuttering.

=== Construction ===
The coronation cost £454,000, which was more than three times the cost of the 1911 ceremony. This cost included the construction of the annexe, which was built as a temporary add-on at the entrance of the abbey for each coronation. In previous years, it had taken the form of an imitation Gothic entrance, but, as a remnant of Edward VIII's modernising attitude, it was now an art-deco design, adorned with stylised heraldic beasts and tapestries belonging to the Duke of Buccleuch. For each coronation, special seating was also constructed to accommodate the large number of guests; 1937 was the first year to make use of metal structures to support the seats, in the form of tubular steel. Four hundred tons were used alongside 72,000 cubic feet (2,000 cubic metres) of wood, with 400 men working on the construction. The theatre (the area in the transept for the first part of the ceremony) and sacrarium (the space in front of the high altar) were at floor level for the first time since the Restoration, having traditionally been raised on a platform.

=== Imperial considerations ===
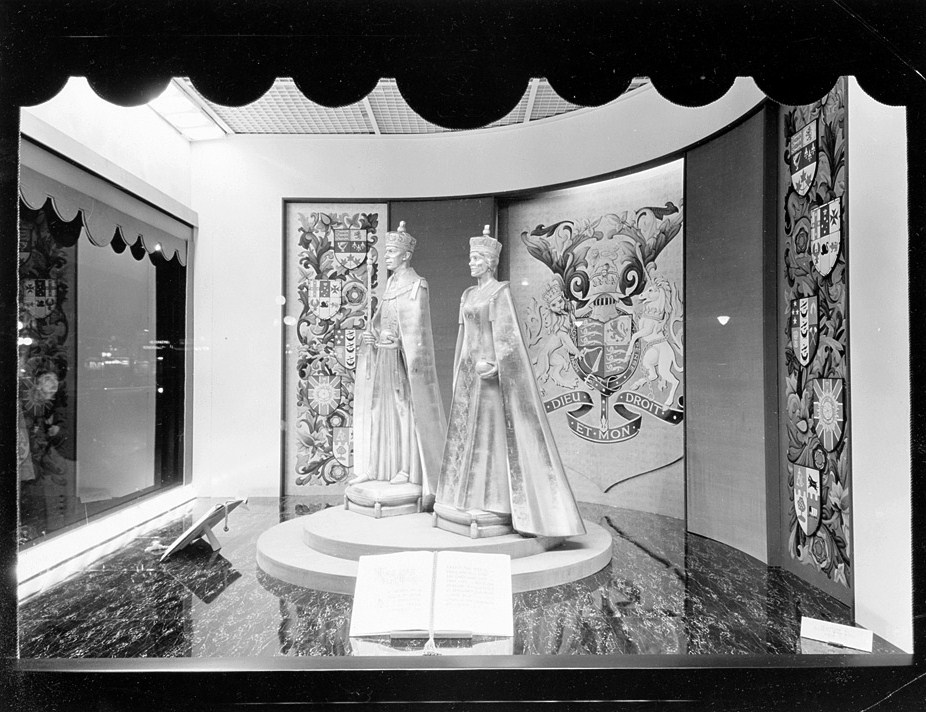
Eaton's department store window in Toronto displaying mannequins of George and Elizabeth wearing their crowns and holding orbs

In 1911, standards of the Dominions—autonomous communities of the British Empire—were borne during the procession. But, after the 1931 Statute of Westminster, which established legislative equality between the Dominions and the United Kingdom, the actual service and coronation rite needed to be updated to reflect this change in political power within the Empire, which itself was beginning to be known as the Commonwealth. Furthermore, the fact that the service was an Anglican rite excluded other faiths and denominations; in 1937, several Dominions had premiers who were Catholic and, by that time, laws which previously excluded people from public office on religious grounds had been repealed. The Coronation Committee altered the rite to reflect this change; the King now swore to maintain "the Protestant Reformed Religion only as established by law in the United Kingdom." During Edward VIII's reign, a committee was established and chaired by the Duke of York to investigate how colonial representatives might be included within the ceremony. The committee failed, though, to implement any changes, except to the Coronation Oath. This was the first amendment to the oath since the coronation of King William III and Queen Mary II in 1689.

Although 1937 saw an increase in the colonial contingents partaking in the procession and an official lunch in Westminster Hall was given to parliamentary representatives of Empire states for the first time, the service itself was barely altered to reflect the new status of the Dominions.

== Guests ==
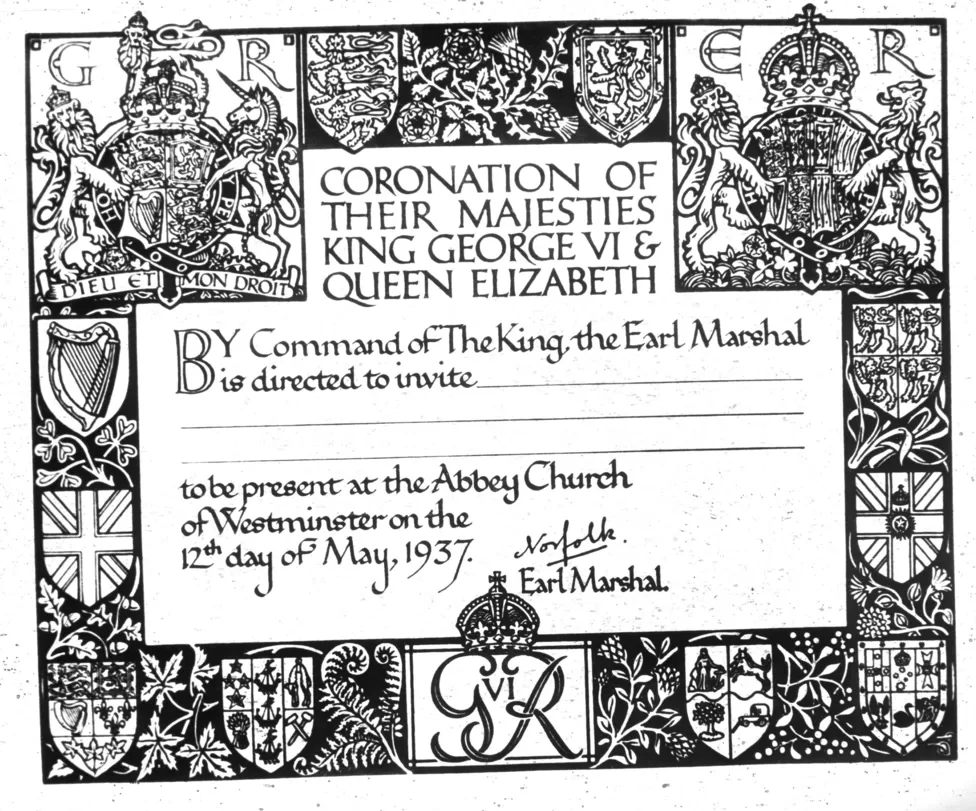
King George VI and Queen Elizabeth coronation invitation

The ceremony was attended by the King's and Queen's daughters, Princesses Elizabeth and Margaret, as well as by the King's mother, Queen Mary. When Mary attended the coronation, she became the first British dowager queen to do so. Members of the extended royal family attended and all peers and members of parliament were invited. Leading colonial administrators, ambassadors, Indian princes and premiers of the dominions were also on the guest list. Working-class representatives included representatives of the trade unions and co-operative societies, while native Africans were allowed to attend for the first time.

=== British royal family ===
- The Princess Elizabeth, the King and Queen's daughter
- The Princess Margaret, the King and Queen's daughter
- Queen Mary, the King's mother
  - The Princess Royal and the Earl of Harewood, the King's sister and brother-in-law
    - Viscount Lascelles, the King's nephew
    - The Hon. Gerald Lascelles, the King's nephew
  - The Duke and Duchess of Gloucester, the King's brother and sister-in-law
  - The Duke and Duchess of Kent, the King's brother and sister-in-law
- Princess and Prince Arthur of Connaught, the King's first cousin and her husband, the King's first cousin once removed
  - Earl of Macduff, the King's first cousin once removed
- Lady Maud and Lord Carnegie, the King's first cousin and her husband
- The Queen of Norway, the King's paternal aunt
  - The Crown Prince and Crown Princess of Norway, the King's first cousin and second cousin (representing his father, the King of Norway)
- Princess Helena Victoria, the King's first cousin once removed
- Princess Marie Louise, the King's first cousin once removed
- Lady Patricia Ramsay, the King's first cousin once removed
  - Alexander Ramsay, the King's second cousin
- The Earl of Athlone and Princess Alice, Countess of Athlone, the King's maternal uncle and aunt (also first cousin once removed)
  - Lady May and Henry Abel Smith, the King's first cousin and her husband
- The Marquess and Marchioness of Carisbrooke, the King's first cousin once removed and his wife
  - Lady Iris Mountbatten, the King's second cousin
- The Marquess and Marchioness of Milford Haven, the King's second cousin and his wife
  - Lady Tatiana Mountbatten, the King's second cousin once removed
  - Earl of Medina, the King's second cousin once removed
- Lord and Lady Louis Mountbatten, the King's second cousin and his wife
  - Patricia Mountbatten, the King's second cousin once removed
- The Marquess and Marchioness of Cambridge, the King's first cousin and his wife
  - Lady Mary Cambridge, the King's first cousin once removed
- The Duchess and Duke of Beaufort, the King's first cousin and her husband
- Lady Helena Gibbs, the King's first cousin
- Lord Frederick Cambridge, the King's first cousin

=== Bowes-Lyon/Cavendish-Bentinck families ===
- The Earl and Countess of Strathmore and Kinghorne, the Queen's parents
  - The Lady and Lord Elphinstone, the Queen's sister and brother-in-law
- The Duke and Duchess of Portland, the Queen's first cousin once removed and his wife
  - Lady Margaret Cavendish-Bentinck, the Queen's second cousin once removed
  - Andrew Erskine-Wemyss, the Queen's second cousin once removed

=== Foreign royalty ===
- (Kingdom of Afghanistan) Sirdar Shah Wali Khan (representing his nephew, the King of Afghanistan)
- (Belgium) The Count of Flanders, the King's third cousin once removed (representing his brother, the King of the Belgians)
- (Tsardom of Bulgaria (1908–1946)) The Prince of Preslav, the King's third cousin once removed (representing his brother, the Tsar of the Bulgarians)
- The Crown Prince and Crown Princess of Denmark and Iceland, the King's second cousins (representing his father, the King of Denmark and Iceland)
- (Kingdom of Egypt) Prince Mohammed Abdul Moneim (representing his first cousin once removed, the King of Egypt)
- (Kingdom of Greece) The Crown Prince of Greece, the King's double second cousin (representing his brother, the King of the Hellenes)
- (Empire of Japan) The Prince and Princess Chichibu (representing his brother, the Emperor of Japan)
- The Prince Consort of Luxembourg, husband of the King's third cousin (representing his wife, the Grand Duchess of Luxembourg)
- Princess Juliana and Prince Bernhard of the Netherlands, the King's fifth cousin and her husband (representing her mother, the Queen of the Netherlands)
- (Kingdom of Romania) The Grand Voevod of Alba Julia, the King's double second cousin once removed (representing his father, the King of the Romanians)
- The Crown Prince of Saudi Arabia (representing his father, the King of Saudi Arabia)
- (Thailand) Prince Chula Chakrabongse (representing his first cousin, the King of Siam)
- The Crown Prince and Crown Princess of Sweden, the King's fourth cousin (also widower of the King's first cousin once removed) and the King's second cousin (representing his father, the King of Sweden)
- Seif Al Islam Hussein (representing his brother, the King of Yemen)
- (Kingdom of Yugoslavia) Princess Paul of Yugoslavia and the Prince Regent of Yugoslavia, the King's second cousin and her husband (representing his first cousin once removed, the King of Yugoslavia)

=== Rulers of British protectorates ===
- (Jordan) The Emir of Transjordan
- The Sultan of Zanzibar
- The Sultan of Johor
- The Sultan of Terengganu
- (Federated Malay States) The Yang di-Pertuan Besar of Negeri Sembilan
- (Federated Malay States) The Sultan of Pahang
- The Maharaja Hari Singh of Jammu and Kashmir
- The Maharaja Jam Sahib of Nawanagar
- The Maharaja of Jodhpur
- The Maharaja of Ratlam

=== Other foreign dignitaries ===
- (Albanian Kingdom (1928–1939)) Ekrem Bey Libohova (representing the King of the Albanians)
- (Ethiopian Empire) Dejazmatch Makonnen Endelkachew (representing the Emperor of Ethiopia)
- (Pahlavi Iran) Hassan Esfandiary (representing the Shahinshah of Iran)
- (Kingdom of Iraq) Sayid Raouf Al Chadirji (representing the King of Iraq)
- (Kingdom of Italy) Conte Grandi (representing the King of Italy)
- Comte Henri de Maleville (representing the Prince of Monaco)
- (Kingdom of Nepal) Sir Kaiser Shumshere Jung Bahadur Rana (representing the Maharajadhiraja of Nepal)
- (United States) James W. Gerard
- (United States) John J. Pershing
- (Nazi Germany) Generalfeldmarschall Werner von Blomberg
- (Soviet Union) Maxim Litvinov
- (Soviet Union) Vladimir Mitrofanovich Orlov
- (France) Yvon Delbos
- (France) Alexis Leger
- (Turkey) İsmet İnönü
- (Turkey) Kâzım Orbay
- (Poland) Józef Beck
- (China) H. H. Kung
- (Spain) Julián Besteiro
- (Brazil) Raul Régis de Oliveira
- (Portugal) Armindo Monteiro
- (Austria) Guido Schmidt
- (Czechoslovakia) Milan Hodža
- (Finland) Rudolf Holsti
- (Latvia) Vilhelms Munters
- (Lithuania) Stasys Lozoraitis
- (Estonia) Johan Laidoner
- (Cuba) Carlos García Vélez
- (Hungary) Kálmán Kánya
- (Uruguay) Luis Alberto de Herrera
- (Panama) Arnulfo Arias
- (Bolivia) Carlos Víctor Aramayo

The abbey's doors were closed to guests at 8.30 on the morning of the coronation. The official record of the ceremonial, published in the London Gazette, describes the seating plan: "The Lords Spiritual were seated on the North side of the Area, or Sacrarium, the Lords Temporal in the South Transept, and the Dowager Peeresses and Peeresses in the North Transept."

== Procession to the abbey ==
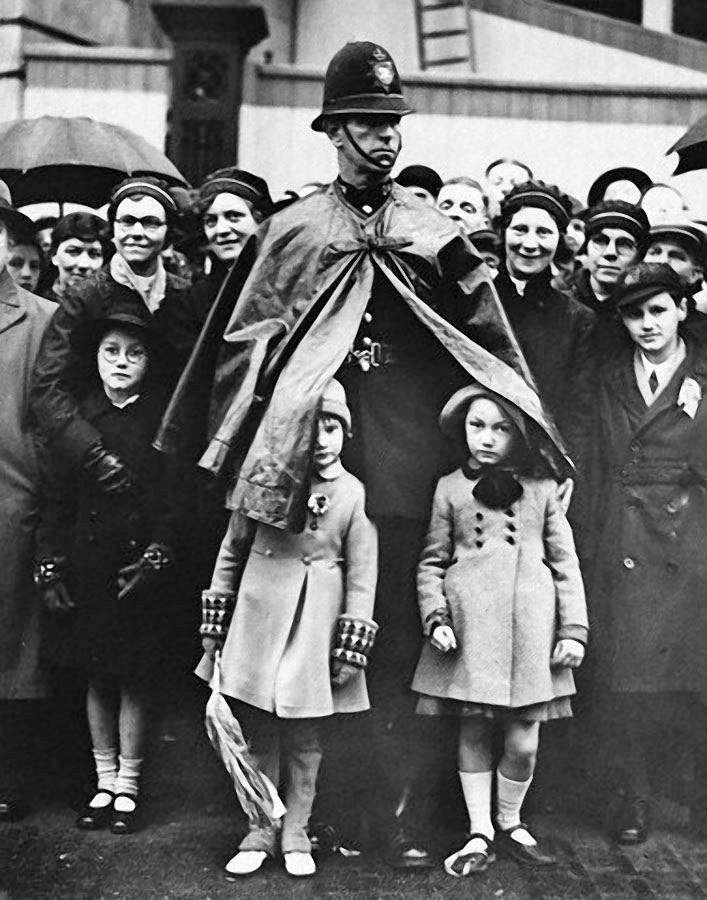
A crowd in Parliament Square waits to watch the coronation procession rehearsal, two days before the coronation ceremony, 10 May 1937

Before the coronation ceremony begins, there is traditionally a lengthy procession to the abbey. The procession left Buckingham Palace and headed up The Mall, though Admiralty Arch, and down Whitehall, before entering Westminster Abbey.

The first to take part in the procession were lesser members and relatives of the Royal Family and the representatives of foreign royalty and heads of state; they departed Buckingham Palace by car between 08:40 and 08:45 and arrived at the abbey ten minutes later; British and Dominion prime ministers followed half an hour later, leaving at 09:15. At 09:49, members of the Royal Family left the palace (Queen Mary's carriage left Marlborough House shortly afterwards at 10:13). The King and Queen then travelled in the Gold State Coach from Buckingham Palace at 10:43; their procession was by far the longest and included numerous military contingents and delegates from Britain, the Dominions, and the colonies, as well as members of the War Office, the Army, Naval and Air Boards and the personal aides-de-camp.

== Procession into the abbey ==
=== Foreign representatives ===
The first to arrive in procession were the royalty and foreign representatives; they arrived ten minutes after departing the palace. The royal members were led in by two officers of arms—the Bluemantle Pursuivant (R.P. Graham-Vivian) and the Portcullis Pursuivant (A.R. Wagner)—followed by two Gentleman Ushers (Captain Humphrey Lloyd and Colonel Vivian Gabriel), and were led to their seats in the royal gallery.

The foreign representatives followed in at roughly 09:00 and were greeted by senior members of the Royal Household and the Diplomatic Corps. (Note: Lieutenant-Colonel T.E.G. Nugent, Comptroller of the Lord Chamberlain's Department, Lieutenant-General Sir Sidney Clive, Marshal of the Diplomatic Corps, J.B. Monck, Vice-Marshal of the Diplomatic Corps, Major Norman Gwatking, Assistant Comptroller of the Lord Chamberlain's Department and Captain Sir John Dashwood, Assistant Marshal of the Diplomatic Corps.) Led in by the Rouge Croix Pursuivant (P.W. Kerr) and the Rouge Dragon Pursuivant (E.N. Geijer); they were escorted to their seats in the choir.

=== Regalia ===
Following tradition dating back to the reign of King Charles II, the regalia were brought to the Deanery of Westminster the night before the coronation. Staff started working at 4 a.m., while guests began arriving two hours later. The Imperial State Crown had been remade for the occasion by the Crown Jewellers, Garrard & Co. Queen Elizabeth's crown was new and made from platinum; it featured the Koh-i-Noor diamond from the crown of Queen Mary. Queen Elizabeth wore a gown made of silk satin, with pure gold thread embroidery in a rose and thistle pattern. The ermine-lined velvet robe had a floral pattern with a gold outline. The goldwork on the gown and the robe was embroidered by the Royal School of Needlework. The gown and the robe also featured designs patriotic to the British Empire. Created by Elizabeth Handley-Seymour, the toile featured the embroidered emblems of the United Kingdom, Canada, New Zealand, Australia, and the other dominions. The national flowers that appeared on the robe included the rose of England, thistle of Scotland, shamrock of Northern Ireland, the lotus of Pakistan, protea of South Africa, maple of Canada, mimosa of Australia, and the fern of New Zealand. Intertwined letter Es for Elizabeth were also embroidered on the robe. Norman Hartnell dressed the maids of honour.

While the litany was sung, the Choir led the Dean and Prebendaries of Westminster down from the High Altar at 09:55; they were carrying the Crown Jewels and regalia, which they then deposited at the Vestibule. The Comptroller of the Lord Chamberlain's Office then handed the regalia to the Lord High Constable, who in turn handed them to the Lord Great Chamberlain; the items were then handed over to individual peers, who are listed below.

Bearers of the Regalia

Regalia	Bearer	Ref.
King's Regalia
St Edward's Staff	The Viscount Halifax	
Sceptre with the Cross	The Duke of Somerset	
Golden Spurs	The Lord Hastings and The Lord Churston	
Sword of Temporal Justice	The Viscount Trenchard	
Sword of Spiritual Justice	The Lord Milne	
Sword of Mercy	The Earl of Cork and Orrery	
Sword of State	The Marquess of Zetland	
Sceptre with the Dove	The Duke of Richmond and Gordon	
Sovereign's Orb	The Duke of Sutherland	
St Edward's Crown	The Marquess of Salisbury	
Paten	Bishop of Norwich	
Chalice	Bishop of Winchester	
Bible	Bishop of Norwich	
Queen's Regalia
Ivory Rod with the Dove	The Earl of Haddington	
Sceptre with the Cross	The Duke of Rutland	
The Queen's Crown	The Duke of Portland	

=== Entrance of the Royal Family ===
Led by two officers of arms—the Rouge Croix Pursuivant and the Rouge Dragon Pursuivant—and two Gentleman Ushers (Rear-Admiral Arthur Bromley and Lieutenant-Colonel Henry De Satgé), the senior members of the Royal Family arrived at 10:15 and formed their procession into the abbey. The Princess Royal was flanked by The Princesses Elizabeth and Margaret, and they were followed by the Duchesses of Gloucester and Kent and then, in pairs, Prince and Princess Arthur of Connaught; Princess Alice, Countess of Athlone and Lady Patricia Ramsay; and Princess Marie Louise and Princess Helena Victoria, each with an attendant, train-bearer, or coronet carrier, as applicable.

Twenty minutes later, the Queen of Norway and Queen Mary arrived, being received by the Earl Marshal. Their procession took a different form to that of other members. The York and Windsor Heralds led, followed by G.A. Ponsonby (Note: Sir George Arthur KCVO, see Debrett's Peerage, 1963, p. 155 for his full details) (Comptroller of Queen Maud's Household) and then the Queen of Norway, attended by Miss von Hanno and followed by the Richmond and Chester Heralds. Then, Queen Mary's Lord Chamberlain (the Marquess of Anglesey) led Queen Mary, whose train was borne by four pages (the Earl of Dalkeith, the Marquess of Lansdowne, Gerald Lascelles, and Viscount Errington) and who was attended by the Mistress of the Robes (the Duchess of Devonshire), two ladies of the bedchamber in waiting, her private secretary, comptroller, and three equerries (two ordinary and one extra).

=== Entrance of the King and Queen ===
A guard of honour had formed at the vestibule and at the entrance, and the King and Queen arrived at 11:00. On their entry, they were greeted by the great officers of state, the archbishops, and the peers bearing the regalia. They then formed their procession, which was led by the King's chaplain and the Chapter at Westminster, who were followed by representatives of the Free Churches and the Church of Scotland. The procession involved all of the great officers of state, the archbishops of Canterbury and York, the lord mayor of London, the officers of arms of England and Scotland, the standards of each dominion, the prime ministers of the UK and of each of the dominions, and the most senior and highest-ranking officials in the Royal Household. They were followed by twelve members of the Yeoman of the Guard and six of its officials.

The King and Queen walked surrounded by their regalia, borne by the designated peers; King George wore his great robes of state, which had to be carried by nine pages of honour:

- Alexander Ramsay (1919–2000), son of Lady Patricia Ramsay
- George Haig, 2nd Earl Haig (1918–2009)
- George Edward Charles Hardinge (1921–1997), son of Alec Hardinge, 2nd Baron Hardinge of Penshurst.
- George Lascelles (1923–2011), later 7th Earl of Harewood (nephew of the King)
- George Jellicoe, 2nd Earl Jellicoe (1918–2007)
- Henry Kitchener, 3rd Earl Kitchener (1919–2011)
- Major (George) Raymond Seymour (1923–2010), grandson of Lord Ismay, and later an assistant private secretary and equerry to Queen Elizabeth The Queen Mother.
- Montague Robert Vere Eliot (1923–1994), son of the Earl of St Germans
- Rognvald Herschell, 3rd Baron Herschell (1923–2008).

The Queen was attended by six maids of honour:

- Lady (Victoria) Margaret Cavendish-Bentinck) (1918–1955), daughter of the Duke of Portland; she later married Gaetano Parente, Principe di Castel Viscardo.
- Lady Diana Legge (1910–1970), daughter of the Earl of Dartmouth.
- Lady Elizabeth Hester Mary Paget (1916–1980), daughter of the Marquess of Anglesey. She later married Raimund von Hofmannsthal.
- Lady Elizabeth Ivy Percy (1916–2008), daughter of the Duke of Northumberland; she later became the Duchess of Hamilton.
- Lady Iris Mountbatten (1920–1982), daughter of the Marquess of Carisbrooke.
- Lady Ursula Manners (1916–2017), daughter of the Duke of Rutland.

The royal couple walked past the choir, in which sat the foreign representatives and delegates, before passing through the screen; after this, they sat or stood in their designated area and the King and Queen took their seats in the Chairs of State in front of the royal box. As the King and Queen and the procession proceeded, the choir sang I was glad with the traditional acclamations of Vivat Regina Elizabetha and Vivat Rex Georgius by the King's Scholars of Westminster School.

== Service ==
The coronation service itself began once the procession into the abbey was over and the King and Queen were seated. Beginning with the recognition, the King then took an oath and was anointed by the Archbishop of Canterbury, before being crowned king. As a remnant of the coronation ceremony's feudal origins, the King then received homage from the peers and peeresses of the realm in attendance.

There were few departures from the services conducted at previous coronations. Efforts were made to shorten the lengthy proceedings: the litany was sung during the regalia procession before the start of the service, and the sermon was omitted entirely. Even so, the service itself lasted for two and a half hours, excluding the preliminary processions.

=== Recognition, oath, and anointing of the King ===
The first part of the service was the recognition, where the Archbishop of Canterbury called for those present to proclaim their recognition of the sovereign as their rightful king. The King was conducted by the Garter King of Arms to St Edward's Chair, and the Archbishop, as tradition dictates, asked: "Sirs, I here present unto you King George, your undoubted King: wherefore all you who are come this day to do your homage and service, are you willing to do the same?" The people replied loudly at each repetition "God save King George". The king then sat in the Chair of Estate and the regalia, except the swords, were laid on the altar. The King then knelt before the altar and swore on the Bible his coronation oath, a copy of which he then signed.

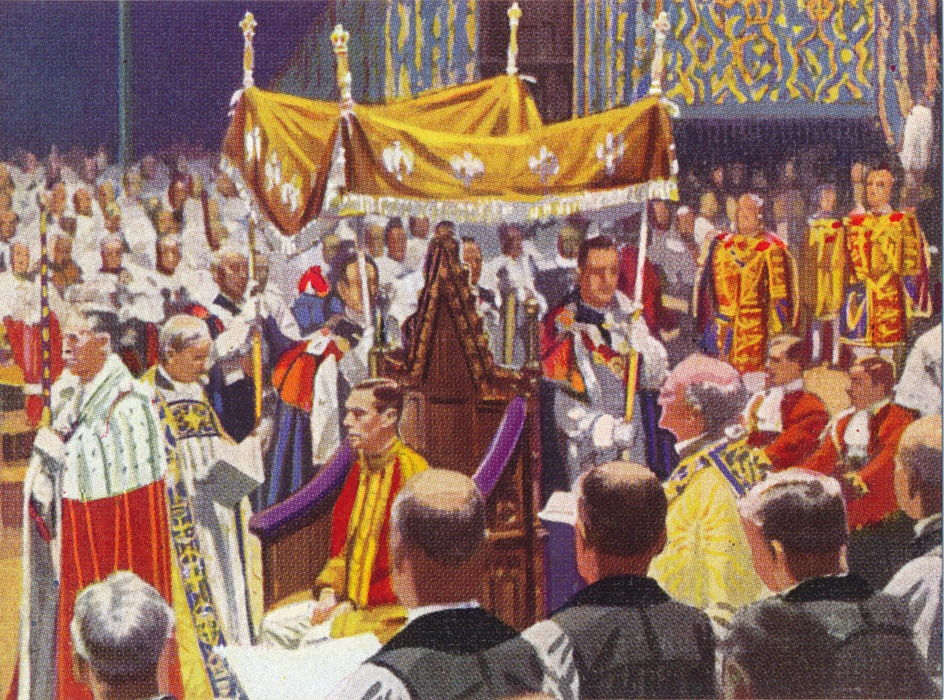
The canopy being moved over the King in preparation for the anointing

The Archbishop of Canterbury then began the Communion Service, while the Bishop of London read the Epistle and the Archbishop of York the Gospel; after the Service concluded, the King and Queen knelt while the choir sang "Veni, Creator Spiritus". This marked the beginning of the anointing of the monarch, when the Archbishop of Canterbury marks the monarch's head with oil to symbolise the introduction of the Holy Spirit. The Choir sang Handel's Zadok the Priest and the Archbishop prayed, before the King was disrobed and sat in St Edward's Chair, with the Canopy borne by four knights of the Garter placed over him. The Archbishop then anointed him with oil from the Ampulla, which had been poured onto the Anointing Spoon.

=== Crowning the King ===
In preparation for his crowning, the King, still on St Edward's Chair, was invested with the two coronation robes, the Colobium Sindonis and the Supertunica by the Dean of Westminster. Next, he was invested with the regalia, each of which symbolised his progress to kingship. First, the Lord Great Chamberlain touched the King's heels with the Golden Spurs; the Great Sword of State was deposited in St Edward's Chapel and the Jewelled Sword of Offering was passed to the King by the Archbishops and Bishops, who said "With this sword do justice"; the King then offered this sword at the altar. Seated again, the Lord Great Chamberlain fastened the Armills and the Dean invested the King with the Robe Royal; the Archbishop passed him the Sovereign's Orb, put the Sovereign's Ring on his fourth finger and handed to him the two sceptres—with the cross (for Royal power) and with the dove (for "mercy and equity"). The Earl of Lincoln, as Deputy of the Lord of the Manor of Worksop, then handed over a glove, which the King wore.

Once adorned with his regalia and seated in St Edward's Chair, King George was crowned with St Edward's Crown by the Archbishop of Canterbury and the people in the abbey proclaimed loudly "God save the King"; the peers and peeresses wore their coronets (the only time that this happens) and the guns in the Royal Parks were fired to mark the crowning. The ceremony appeared to run smoothly, although there were a few inconspicuous mishaps: the Archbishop of Canterbury almost placed the crown on the King's head the wrong way, one bishop stepped on the King's train, and another obscured the words of the Oath with his thumb while the King was reading it.

=== Enthronement and homage to the King ===
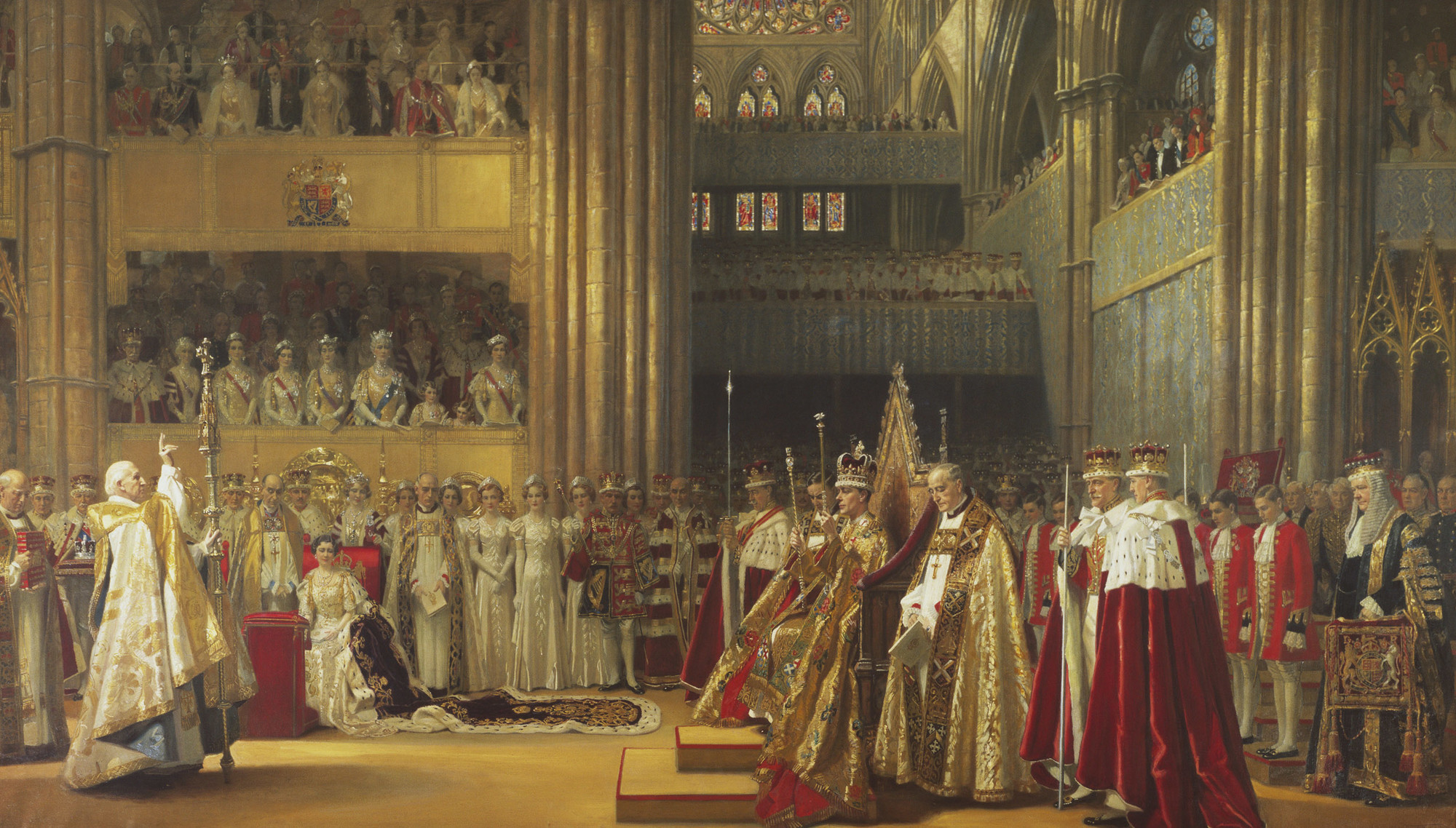
A 1938 painting by Frank O. Salisbury, depicting the coronation service

In the text of the service, this part of the ceremony was described using the archaic term "inthronization". The Archbishop of Canterbury presented the Bible to the King and the King returned it to him, who gave it to the Dean, who placed it on the Altar. The King handed the glove over to the Lord Chamberlain of the Household and the Sceptre with the Cross to the Lord of the Manor of Worksop. The Benediction followed and then the King moved over to the other throne, accompanied by the Bishops of Bath and Wells and of Durham, the Great Officers of State, the Lords carrying the swords and the Lords who had carried the regalia. The Archbishop knelt and paid homage to the King; the Archbishop of York did so next, followed by each of the Bishops. The Dukes of the Blood Royal then did homage, followed by the Lords Temporal (Dukes, Marquesses, Earls, Viscounts, Barons); six anthems were sung by the Choir during the homage: "O come ye servants of the Lord", "Hear my prayer, O Lord", "O clap your hands together, all ye people", "All the ends of the world shall remember themselves", "O praise God in His holiness" and "Thou wilt keep him in perfect peace".

=== The Queen ===
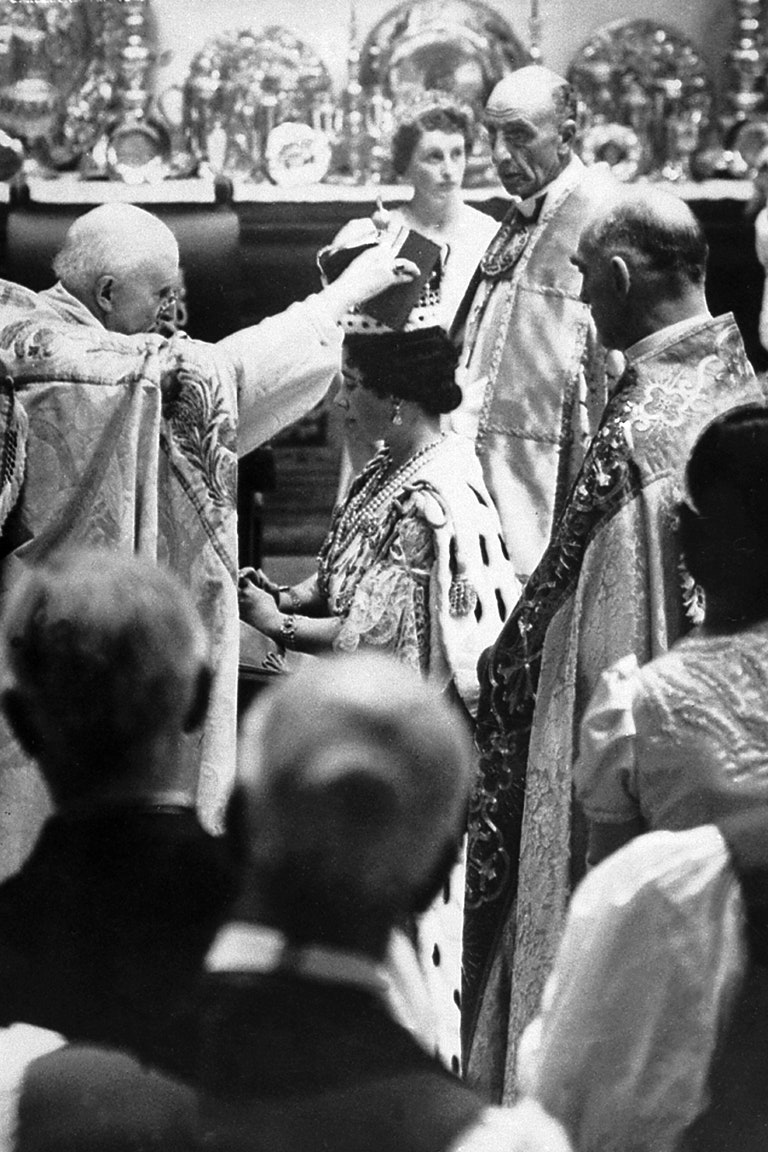
Queen Elizabeth being crowned

The Queen was crowned and anointed in a much smaller and simpler ceremony. This began immediately after the homage to the King finished, when the Queen knelt in prayer before the altar. She then went to the Faldstool, which had been placed before the altar, where she knelt under a canopy, which was held by the Duchesses of Norfolk, Rutland, Buccleuch, and Roxburghe. The Archbishop anointed her, placed on her fourth finger on her right hand the Queen Consort's Ring, and then crowned her, at which point the Princesses and peeresses donned their coronets. She was then handed the Queen Consort's Sceptre with Cross and the Queen Consort's Ivory Rod with Dove, before walking over to her own throne beside the King, where she sat.

=== End of the service ===
The Offertory followed, in which the King and Queen offered their regalia on the Altar. They then received Holy Communion from the Archbishop and were passed their crowns before returning to their thrones where they were also given their sceptres back. Te Deum was sung by the choir. A recess followed, during which the King and Queen proceeded to St Edward's Chapel. There, the King delivered the Sceptre with the Dove to the Archbishop who laid it on the altar. The bearers of the Orb, the Golden Spurs and St Edward's Staff delivered these to the Dean of Westminster, who laid them on the altar in the chapel. The King was disrobed of his Royal Robe of State by the Lord Great Chamberlain and put on the Robe of Estate. The King, now wearing the Imperial State Crown, was then given the Orb by the Archbishop.

While the King and Queen were in the chapel, the Officers of Arms arranged the procession out of the abbey, which was similar in form to the procession into the abbey. The King and Queen then joined the procession, with the King carrying the Sceptre with the Cross in his right hand and the Orb in his left, while the Queen carried her Sceptre with the Cross in her right hand and the Ivory Rod with the Dove in her left. They proceeded to the West Door of the Abbey as the National Anthem, "God Save the King", was sung.

== State Procession to Buckingham Palace ==
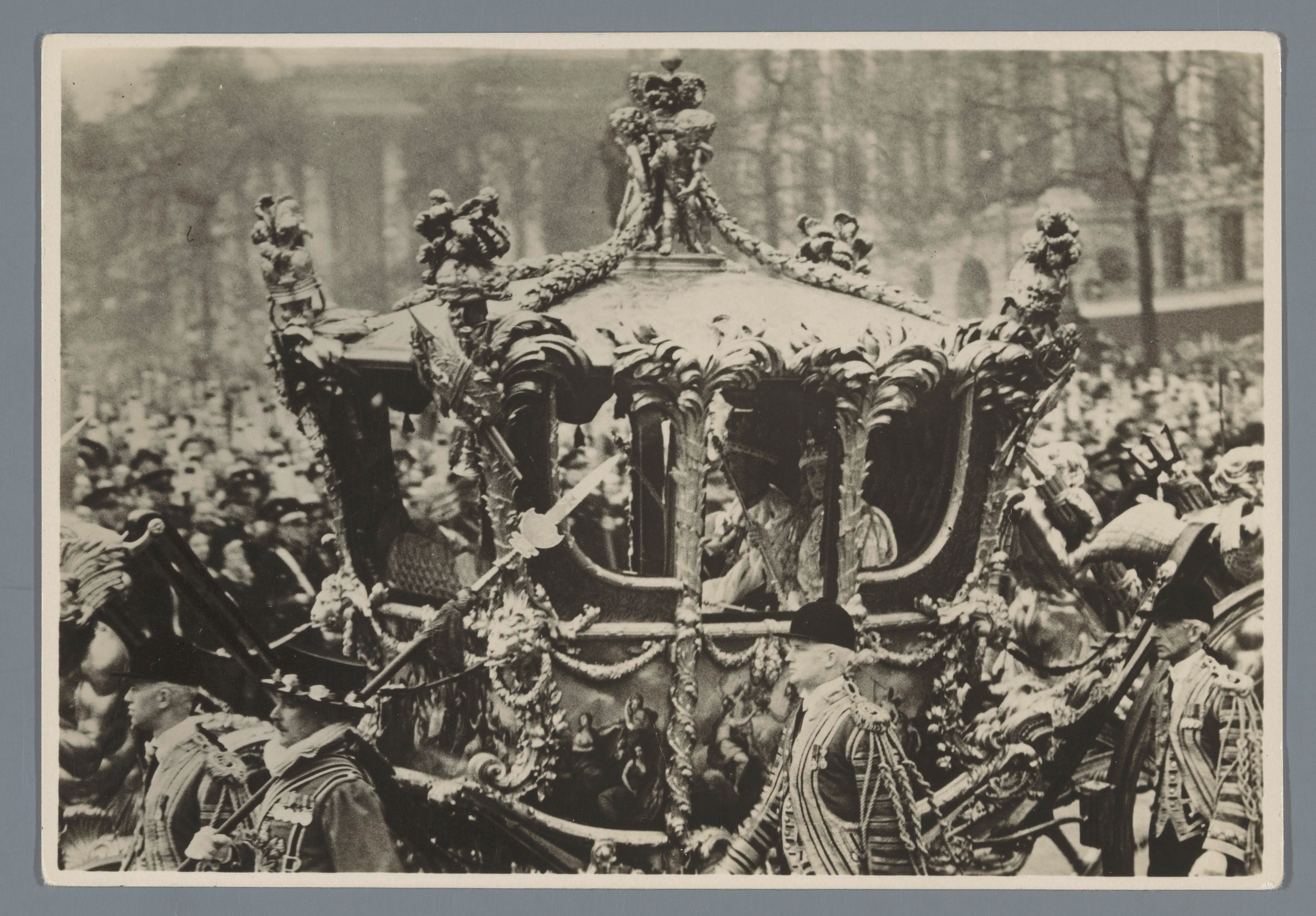
The King and Queen in the Gold State Coach during the procession

As in the 1902 and 1911 events, the coronation was followed by a procession through London's streets from Westminster Abbey to the Royal residence, allowing the public to view the new king and queen. In 1937, this return route was extended significantly. From Westminster Abbey, it passed around Parliament Square and up the Victoria Embankment (where 40,000 schoolchildren were waiting) and then along Northumberland Avenue, into Trafalgar Square, up Cockspur Street through to Pall Mall; from there, the procession went up St James' Street, joining Piccadilly, then up Regent Street, then west along Oxford Street, before turning past Marble Arch and then down East Carriage Road, alongside Hyde Park; from there, the procession passed through Hyde Park Corner and then through Wellington Arch, on to Constitution Hill and then back into Buckingham Palace.

The progression included a large number of military personnel from across the Empire. There were representative detachments from all the elements of the British armed forces and the reserve forces, the British Indian Army and Royal Indian Navy, contingents from the British Dominions and a contingent representing the defence forces of the Colonial Empire. Contingents taking part represented the following sections of the Empire: India, the dominions of Canada, Australia, New Zealand, Burma, Newfoundland and South Africa, and the Colonies of Southern Rhodesia, Kenya, Uganda, Tanganyika, Nyasaland, the Gambia, the Gold Coast, Sierra Leone, Somalia, Aden, Transjordan, Malta, the West Indies, British Guiana, Honduras, Ceylon, the Falklands and Hong Kong. In total there were 32,500 officers and men either marching or lining the route. Overall, the procession was 2.0 miles (3.2 km) in length and took 40 minutes to pass any given point. The route of the procession was the longest on record, at six and a quarter miles (10.1 kilometres). Before and after the event, the British and Dominion troops were accommodated in temporary camps at Kensington Gardens, Regent's Park, Primrose Hill, Olympia and Hampton Court; the Colonial troops were housed in various London barracks.

== Music ==
The musical director for the service was Ernest Bullock, who was organist and Master of the Choristers at Westminster Abbey, in consultation with the Master of the King's Musick, Henry Walford Davies. The Abbey choir was supplemented by choirs from the Chapel Royal, St Paul's Cathedral, St George's Chapel, Windsor and the Temple Church. An orchestra composed of musicians from London's main orchestras was conducted by Sir Adrian Boult.

Tradition demanded the inclusion of George Frederick Handel's Zadok the Priest (1727) and Hubert Parry's I was glad (1902). New work written for the occasion included Confortare (Be strong and play the Man) by Walford Davies and the Festival Te Deum in F Major by Ralph Vaughan Williams. Perhaps the best known work from the 1937 coronation is Crown Imperial, an orchestral march by William Walton. It was the desire of Bullock and Davies that the programme should include music from 'Tudor times to the present day' and so new pieces were composed by Arnold Bax, Arthur Bliss and Granville Bantock, as well as Walton and Vaughan Williams. Walton's Crown Imperial was played while the King and Queen progressed up the nave; Edvard Grieg's Homage March from Sigurd Jorsalfar and Edward German's Coronation March were played when the Princes and Princesses, and then Queen Mary arrived, respectively. Choral works included the traditional plainsong Veni, Creator Spiritus, William Byrd's Creed and Sanctus, Christopher Tye's O Come ye Servants of the Lord, Henry Purcell's Hear My Prayer, Samuel Sebastian Wesley's Thou Wilt Keep Him in Perfect Peace, Sir George Dyson's O Praise God in His holiness, Sir Edward Bairstow's Let My Prayer Come Up into Thy Presence and Dr William Henry Harris's Offertorium.

List of music played at the Coronation Service
Title of piece	Composer
Music before the Service
Concerto in D (entrance of the Royal Family)	George Frederick Handel (arranged by Hamilton Harty)
Marching Song	Gustav Holst
French Military March (entrance of the Foreign Representatives)	Camille Saint-Saëns
Prelude Khovanchtchina	Modest Mussorgsky
Italiana	arranged by Ottorino Respighi
Entracte III in B flat from Rosamunde	Franz Schubert
Finale of the Symphony No. 1	Johannes Brahms
Slow movement from the Symphony No. 3	Sir Arnold Bax
Prelude in C minor (organ only)	Johann Sebastian Bach
"Ein feste Burg ist unser Gott" (Regalia procession in the cloister)	Martin Luther
Hymn: "Oh most merciful" (Regalia procession in the Abbey)	Charles Wood
The Litany for Five Voices: "O God the Father of Heaven" (Regalia Procession from Theatre to West Door)	Thomas Tallis
Canticum Fidei (Regalia Procession)	Thomas Dunhill
King’s Herald	Herbert Howells
Finale of the Enigma Variations	Sir Edward Elgar
Huldigungs March (entry of the Princes and Princesses)	Edvard Grieg
Minuet from Saul	George Frederick Handel
Coronation March (entry of Queen Mary)	Sir Edward German
Crown Imperial Coronation March	William Walton
Minuet from Arminius	George Frederick Handel
Gavotte from Otho	George Frederick Handel
Trumpet tune from Diocletian	Henry Purcell
Imperial March (entry of the King and Queen)	Sir Edward Elgar
Music during the Service
Fanfare A	Sir Ernest Bullock
Anthem: "I was glad"	Hubert Parry
Introit: "Let my prayer come up"	Edward Bairstow
Credo	William Byrd
"Veni Creator Spiritus" (Original VIII Mode Melody)	Traditional
Anthem: "Zadok the Priest"	George Frederick Handel
Confortare: "Be strong"	Henry Walford Davies
Anthem: "O clap your hands together"	Orlando Gibbons
Anthem: "All the ends of the world"	William Boyce
Anthem: "O Praise God in his holiness"	George Dyson
Anthem: "Thou wilt keep him in perfect peace"	Samuel Sebastian Wesley
Offertorium: "O hearken thou"	William Henry Harris
Sanctus	William Byrd
Pater Noster	John Merbecke
Gloria in Excelsis in B-flat	Charles Villiers Stanford
Threefold Amen	Orlando Gibbons
Festal Te Deum in F	Ralph Vaughan Williams
God Save the King	Traditional
Music after the Service
Pomp and Circumstance March No. 1	Sir Edward Elgar
Pomp and Circumstance March No. 4	Sir Edward Elgar

== Commentary ==
Despite a number of hitches, described above, the coronation ran relatively smoothly. It has been somewhat overshadowed in history by the larger Coronation of Queen Elizabeth II in 1953; the Abbey's sacrist, Jocelyn Perkins, said that the 1953 event was "out and away the most impressive" of the 1953, 1937 and 1911 coronations. Nonetheless, a number of those present, the King included, commented privately on the spirituality of the ceremony. Despite recalling it as being "inordinately long" and remembering how heavy the crown and robes were, the Queen said that it was "wonderful and there is a great sense of offering oneself". The King wrote to Lang thanking him for his support and, although he said it was an "ordeal", he also wrote that "I felt I was being helped all the time by Someone Else as you said I would".

== Media coverage ==
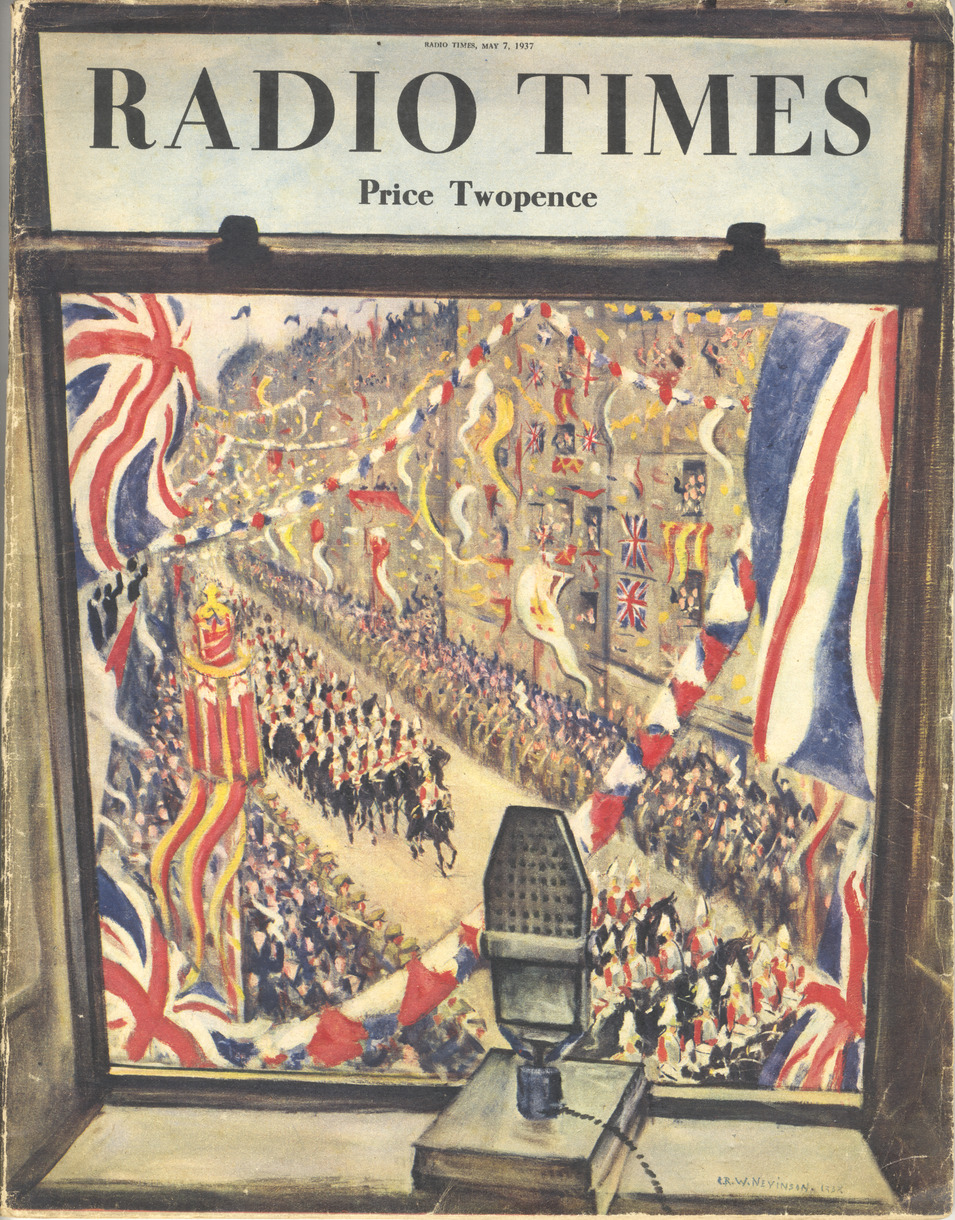
The front cover of the coronation edition of the Radio Times with a depiction of a commentator's vantage point by C. R. W. Nevinson

=== Radio ===
On the eve of the coronation, the King made a live broadcast from Buckingham Palace which was heard throughout the British Empire. The Coronation ceremony itself was not televised, but it was the first coronation service to be broadcast on radio; 28 microphones were placed around the Abbey to capture the music and speech. There was no commentary, but the Reverend Frederic Iremonger, Director of Religion at the BBC and Honorary Chaplain to the King, read out the rubrics or written directions from the service book from a seat high in the triforium over Saint Edward's Chapel. During the most sacred parts of the service, the consecration and the Holy Communion, the microphones were turned off and listeners heard hymns being sung by the choir in the Church of St Margaret, Westminster. The ability to project the service to citizens of the Empire allowed the Coronation to further Britain's imperial ambitions; as Range wrote, "with the twentieth century there also came a heightened awareness of ... the propagandistic qualities of the event".

The BBC and CBC jointly transmitted the proclamation of George VI. In the lead up to the Coronation, the BBC organised talks by Ministers to be broadcast under the name Responsibilities of Empire, and also broadcast The Empire's Homage featuring messages from colonial officers and citizens from across the Empire. The BBC's Empire Service broadcast the whole service, lasting two-and-a-half hours.

=== Television ===
The procession was broadcast on the BBC Television Service, which had only been operating since the previous November. Several tons of television cables, measuring 8 miles (13 km), were laid across central London, so that the images from three Emitron television cameras could be sent to the transmission centre at Alexandra Palace. Commentary was by Frederick Grisewood, who was with the cameras at Hyde Park Corner. The coverage of the procession is regarded as being the BBC's first outside broadcast. In reviewing the broadcast, The Daily Telegraph commented: "Horse and foot, the Coronation procession marched into English homes yesterday," while the Daily Mail said: "When the King and Queen appeared the picture was so vivid that one felt that this magical television is going to be one of the greatest of all modern inventions."

=== Newsreels ===
The coronation service of George VI was the first to be filmed; the 40 camera crew inside the Abbey were required to wear full evening dress. It was later shown in edited form as a newsreel in cinemas across the British Empire. The service was later broadcast from these recordings, with the authorities censoring only one small section: a clip of Queen Mary wiping a tear from her eye.

== Honours and official commemorations ==
=== Programme of celebrations and royal events ===
The Ribbon of King George's Coronation Medal

Aside from the Coronation ceremony itself, a 23-day-long programme of official events spanned most of May 1937. The 1902 Coronation was the first to see such a programme implemented, but 1937 was nearly twice as long, and, building on similar developments in 1911, it was a very public spectacle; Sir Roy Strong argues that the month-long festivities were designed to "recapture the confidence of the nation" following the abdication crisis. The first week saw receptions for foreign visitors and delegates, while a State Banquet was held on 10 May, but the weeks following the coronation saw more public spectacles; the following day included a royal drive through north London, 16 May included a luncheon at Guildhall with London dignitaries and the 'Empire Service of Youth' in Westminster. On 20 and 21 May the King and Queen inspected fleets and visited flagships, while, on 22 May the Queen visited Hyde Park to inspect St John's ambulances and then drove through another area in North London.

=== Coronation honours, medals, coinage and stamps ===
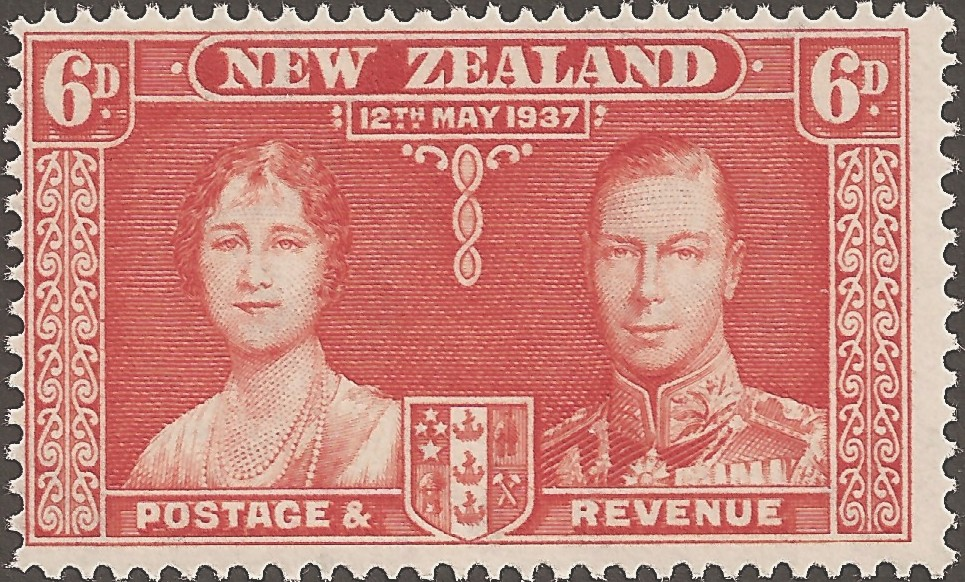
Commemorative stamp, issued in New Zealand

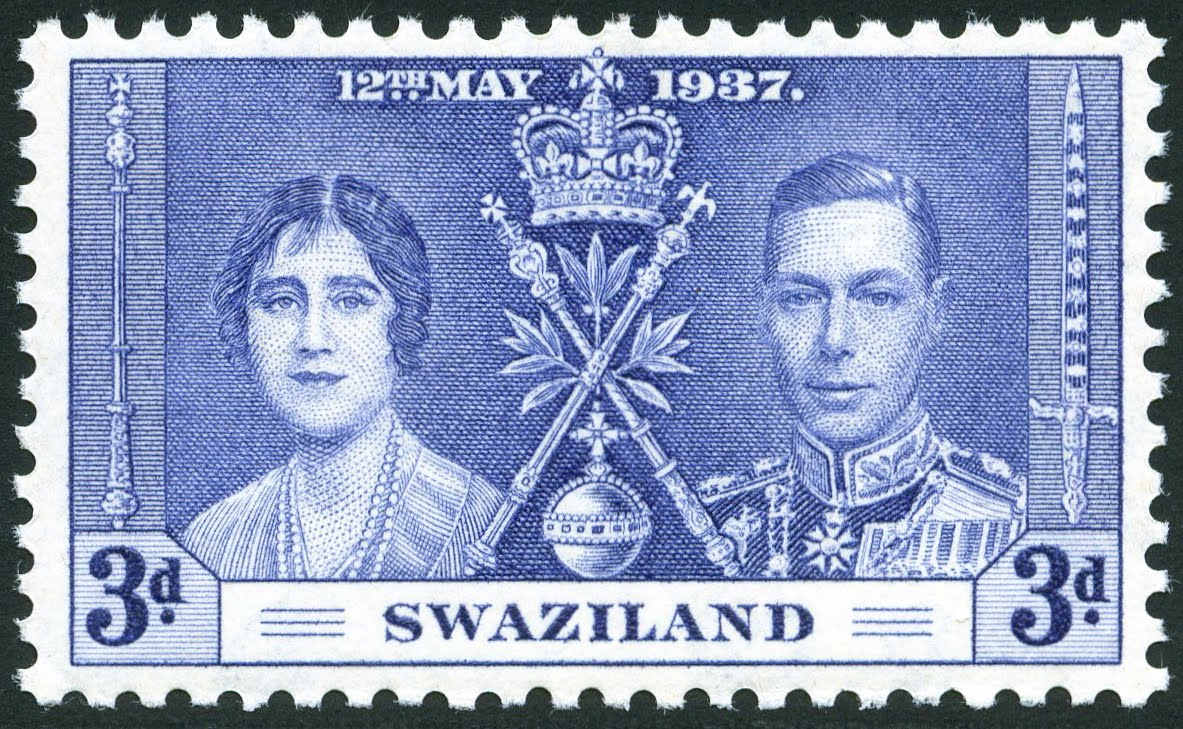
Another stamp, issued by Swaziland

The King marked the occasion of his coronation by conferring honours on a select group of his subjects; in all, thirteen peerages and seven baronetcies were created, while appointments were made to the Privy Council and to the Orders of the Garter, Thistle, Bath, Merit, Star of India, St Michael and St George and the Royal Victorian Order. An official medal was also struck to mark the occasion, as is customary; however, unlike his father's and grandfather's coronation medals, it was produced in one class. The medal was issued to 90,279 people from across the Empire. Canada, for instance, was allowed just over 10,000, with many being issued to commanding officers in the military, cabinet ministers, senators and their staff and the staff of the Governor General.

The Royal Mint issued two special 1937 coin sets comprising the coinage for that year and commemorative issues. 5,501 gold Sovereigns and half-Sovereigns were minted (the only ones of George VI's reign). Additionally, over 400,000 Coronation crowns were issued, plus over 26,000 at proof grade. The Post Office had planned to issue special commemorative stamps to mark the coronation of Edward VIII, but, on his abdication, were uncertain as to whether a new design could be prepared in time, but invited Eric Gill to submit designs for a 1½d stamp. Another artist, Edmund Dulac, also submitted two plans. The King accepted Dulac's and they were printed in brown with a hint of violet the day after the Coronation.

== Other celebrations and commemorations ==
=== United Kingdom ===
The streets along the procession route were crowded with people, with women estimated by one newspaper to outnumber men two-to-one. In all, 20,000 police officers were deployed to line the route and keep the crowds calm and, apart from a "dense crush" in Trafalgar Square, which the police dispersed, there were few problems with managing the public in London. In London and elsewhere across Britain, the Coronation became a social occasion, with street parties taking place, in which inhabitants and communities closed off roads, decorated their streets with bunting and flags, and laid on a celebratory lunch; the Pearly Kings and Queens, a traditional part of working-class culture in London, turned out, joining in with festivities and theatrically mocking the Royal Family.

Mass Observation, a research programme aimed at curating a record of everyday life in Britain, had been launched in January 1937. Contributors across the country were invited to record the details of the day of the Coronation in a diary for the project, whether the events of the Coronation were part of this day for them or not. The same exercise was repeated every 12 May in following years, and again when Mass Observation was relaunched in 1981. It continues to be an annual initiative into the 2020s, open to anyone to contribute.

=== Commemorative rail services ===
The Coronation Scot and The Coronation were trains operated by the London, Midland and Scottish Railway and the London and North Eastern Railway respectively, in order to celebrate the coronation. Both were uniquely constructed streamlined express trains, with the intent of matching the level of luxury surrounding the event and the royal family.

=== Commemorative structures ===
Kuala Kangsar Clock Tower at Kuala Kangsar, Perak commemorating the coronation. Completed in 1939.

Two clock towers were built in Malaya (now Malaysia) to commemorate the coronation. One is located at Medan Pasar, Kuala Lumpur, and was erected in 1937. The clock tower still exists although the memorial plaques were removed following the independence of Malaya (1957). The other tower is located at Kuala Kangsar, Perak, and was completed in 1939. It still stands and has become a popular tourist attraction. In Devon, England, the Bantham Coronation Boathouse was built by Lieutenant Commander Charles E. Evans RNVR to celebrate the event.

=== Empire ===
The National Archives released photographs of celebrations for the Coronation from across the British Empire where various commemorations were held. These included military parades, athletics events and religious services, and the gallery below shows examples of these commemorative events:

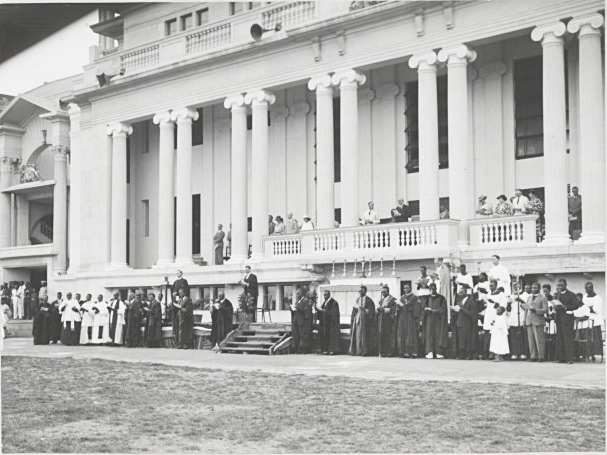
United Religious Service, High Court building, Accra

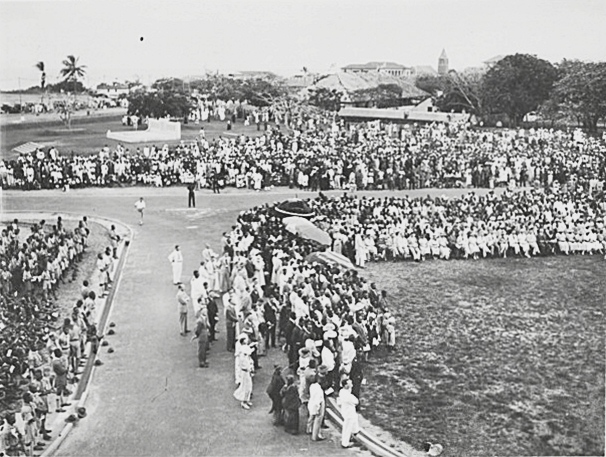
United Religious Service, Gold Coast

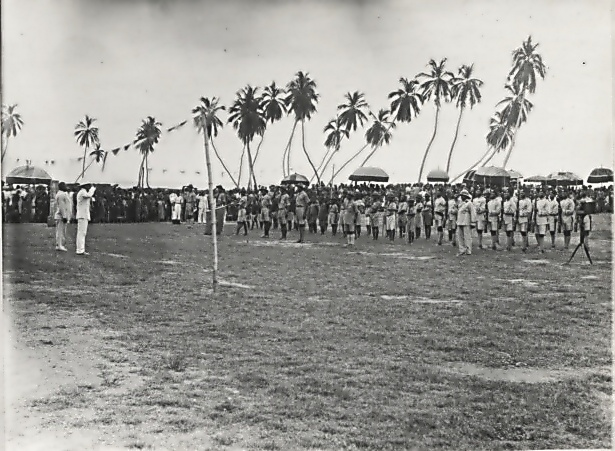
Coronation Day Parade, Saltpond

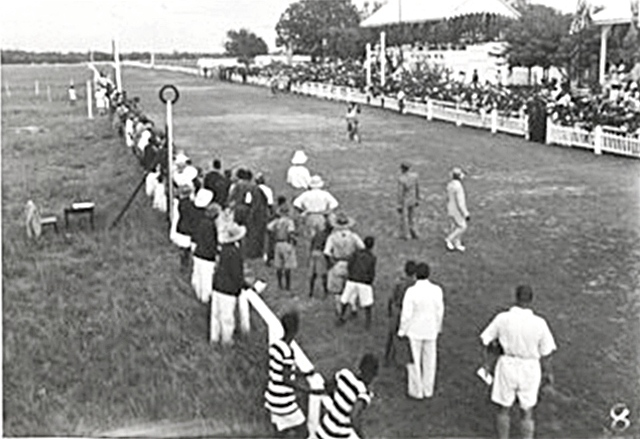
Athletics event, possibly in Accra

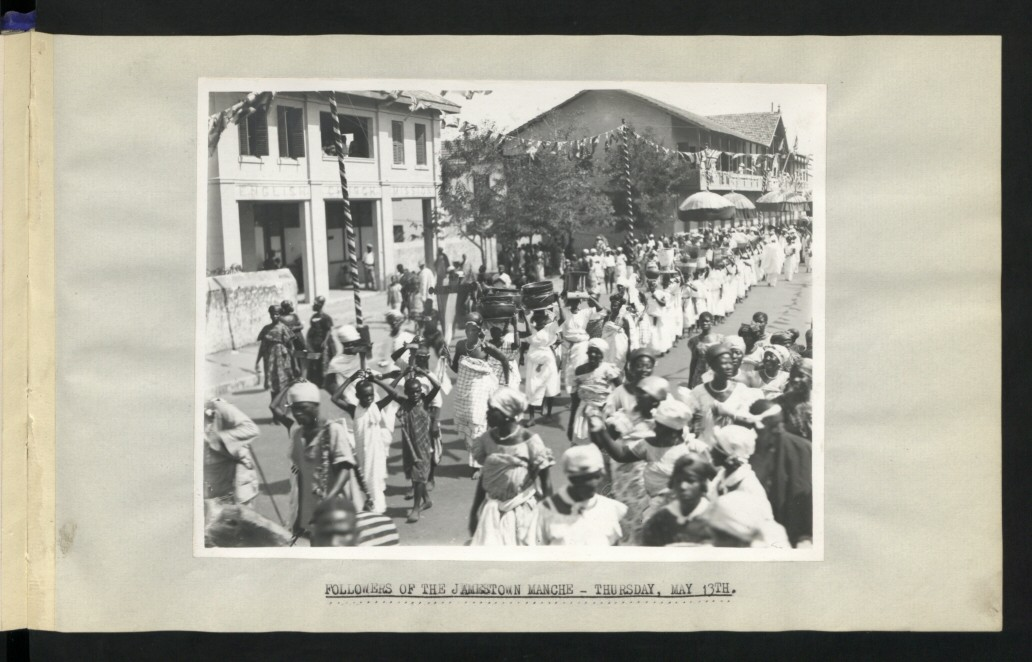
Jamestown, Gold Coast

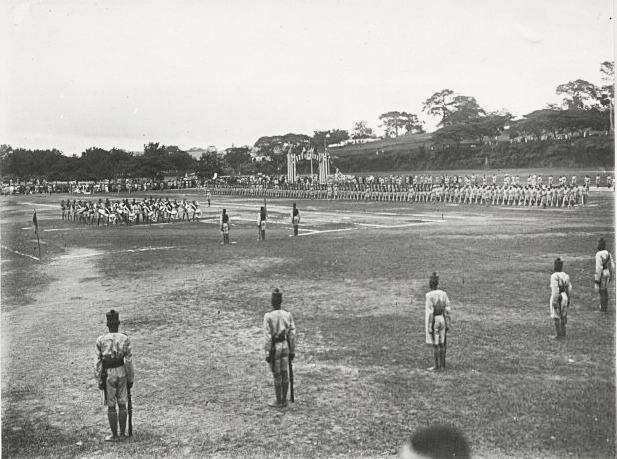
Ceremonial parade, Kumasi

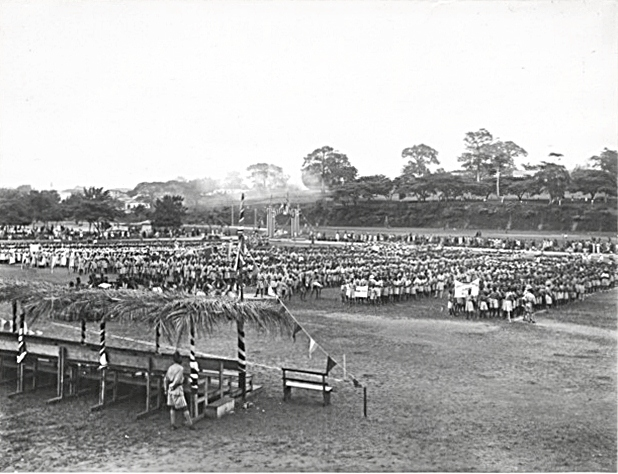
Distribution of souvenirs to schoolchildren

=== Memorabilia ===
An Empire flag showcasing all the realms of the newly-crowned King

The coronation was capitalised on by manufacturers as a means of selling commemorative material. Recordings of the service were put up for sale, while glassware and pottery were also made to commemorate the event. In Canada, for instance, at least five cookbooks were printed to mark the Coronation. British Empire flags featuring the emblems of the dominions and India were also produced to celebrate their role in a united empire. The ones dating back to 1937 were based on a design previously used for the coronation of George V in 1911.

=== Representation in fiction ===
In Howard Spring's 1940 novel, Fame Is the Spur, the coronation is seen through the eyes of the central character, Hamer Shawcross, who attends the event as a newly-elevated viscount. Along with his fellow peers, he is discomforted by the tedious hours of waiting, the lack of organised refreshments, the difficulty of finding toilets and, above all, the confusion on leaving the abbey when chauffeurs are directed to the wrong exits to meet their masters, with many of those attending having to walk home in the rain.

== The Coronation Review of the Fleet ==
The final coronation event was the Review of the Fleet, held on 20 May at Spithead off the coast at Portsmouth. The largest assembly of warships since the coronation review of 1911, it has been described by military historian Hedley Paul Willmott as "the last parade of the Royal Navy as the world's greatest and most prodigious navy". Ten British battleships and battlecruisers were present, and for the first time at a coronation review, four aircraft carriers. Altogether, there were 101 surface warships, 22 submarines and 11 auxiliaries drawn from the Home, Mediterranean and Reserve Fleets. The Review Procession included the royal yacht, HMY Victoria and Albert, two minesweepers and a survey ship. The Commonwealth and Empire were represented by two warships from Canada and one each from New Zealand and India. A large complement of British merchant ships ranging from ocean liners to paddle steamers were also present.

By tradition, foreign navies were invited to send a single warship each to the review and seventeen were present. Notable among them were the USS New York, the new French battleship Dunkerque and the elderly Soviet Marat. Also present were the formidable looking German "pocket battleship" Admiral Graf Spee, the Argentine battleship ARA Moreno, the Greek cruiser Georgios Averof and the Japanese heavy cruiser Ashigara.

Following the review, in which the King and Queen on the royal yacht passed along seven lines of moored ships, there was a flypast by the Fleet Air Arm, however a planned second pass had to be abandoned because of the misty weather. That night, the assembled ships were illuminated by their own searchlights; the spectacle was famously described on BBC Radio by commentator Lieutenant-Commander Thomas Woodrooffe, who had enjoyed too much naval hospitality and was very drunk.

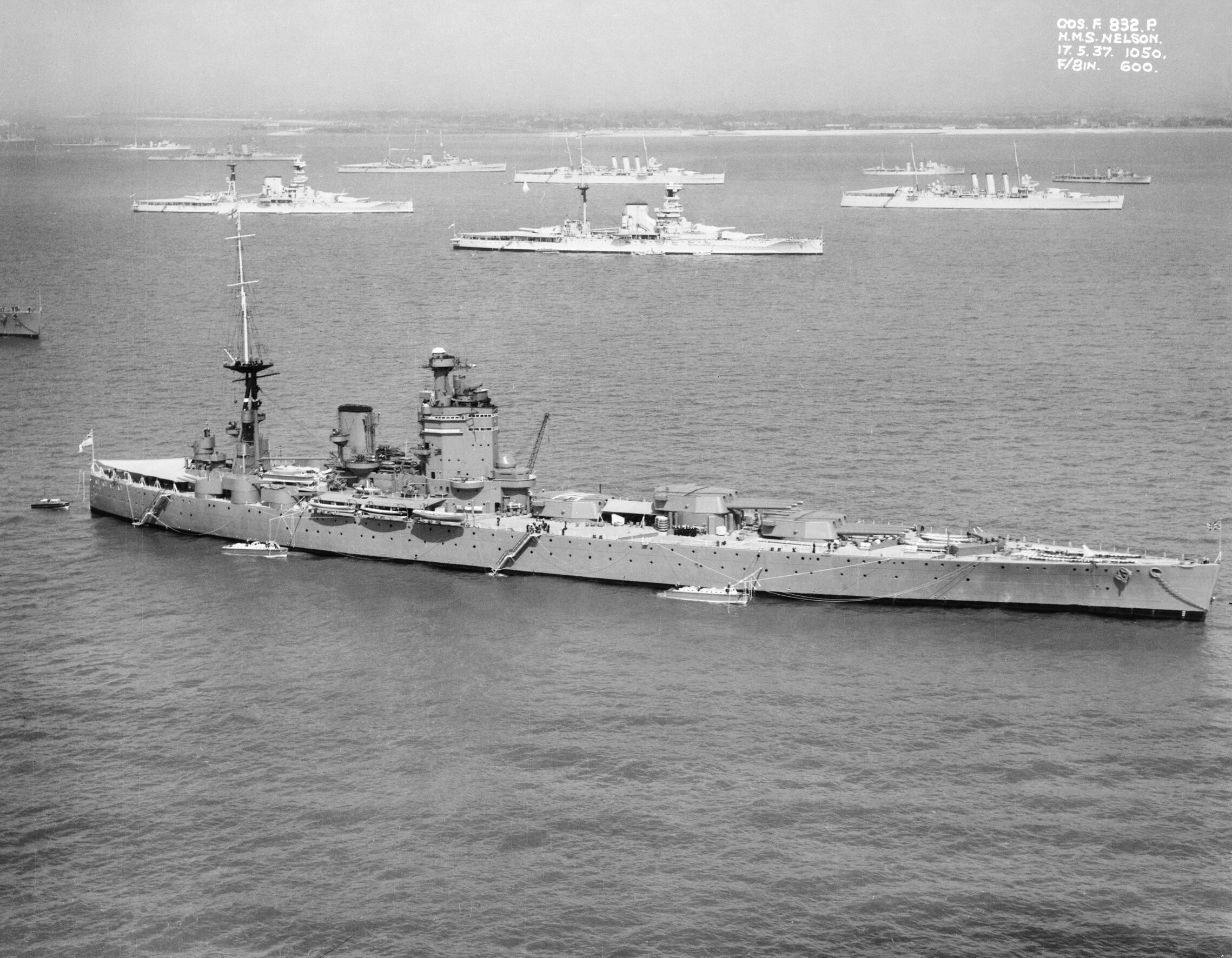
The battleship HMS Nelson off Spithead for the 1937 Fleet Review

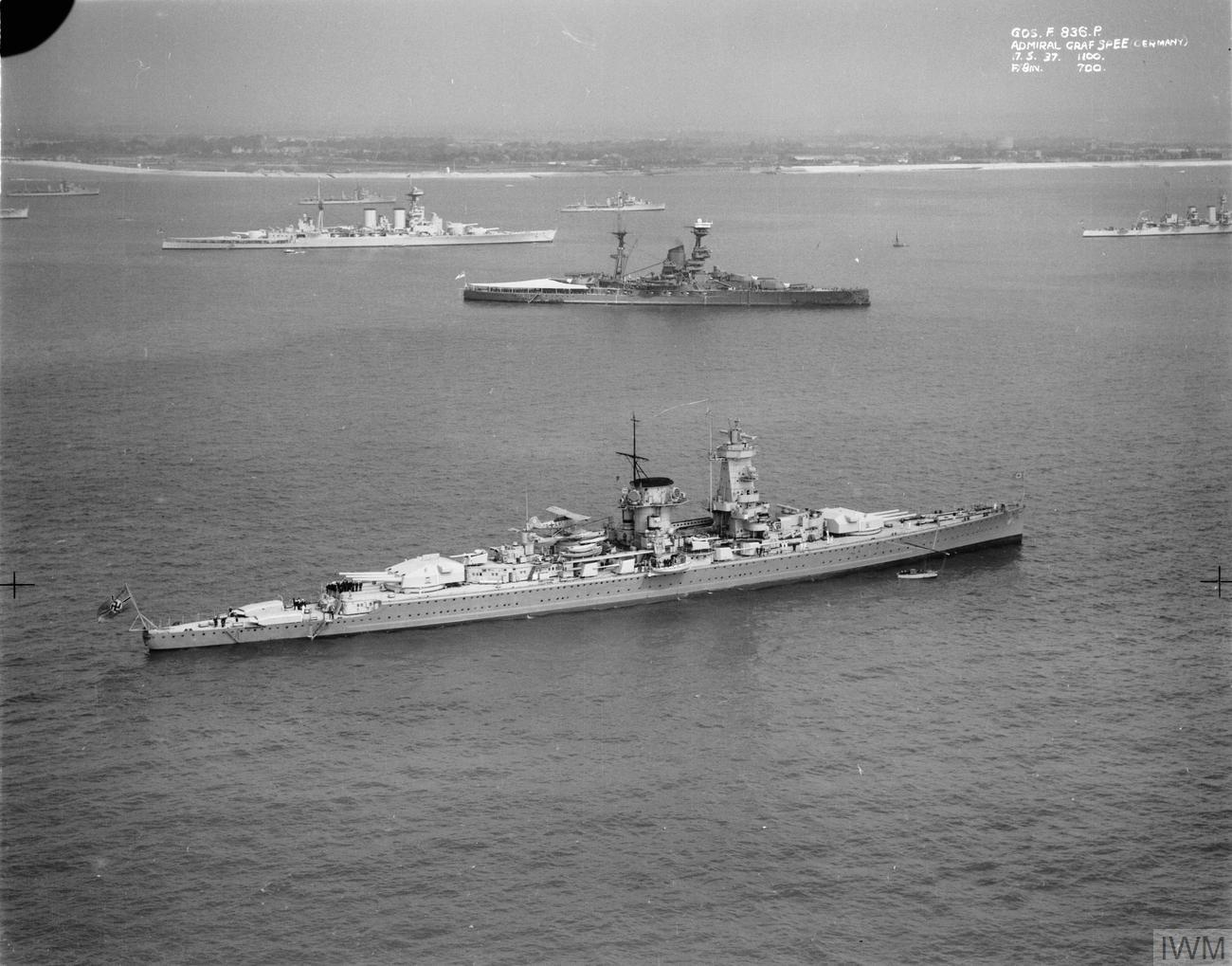
Admiral Graf Spee at Spithead in 1937; HMS Hood and Resolution lie in the background

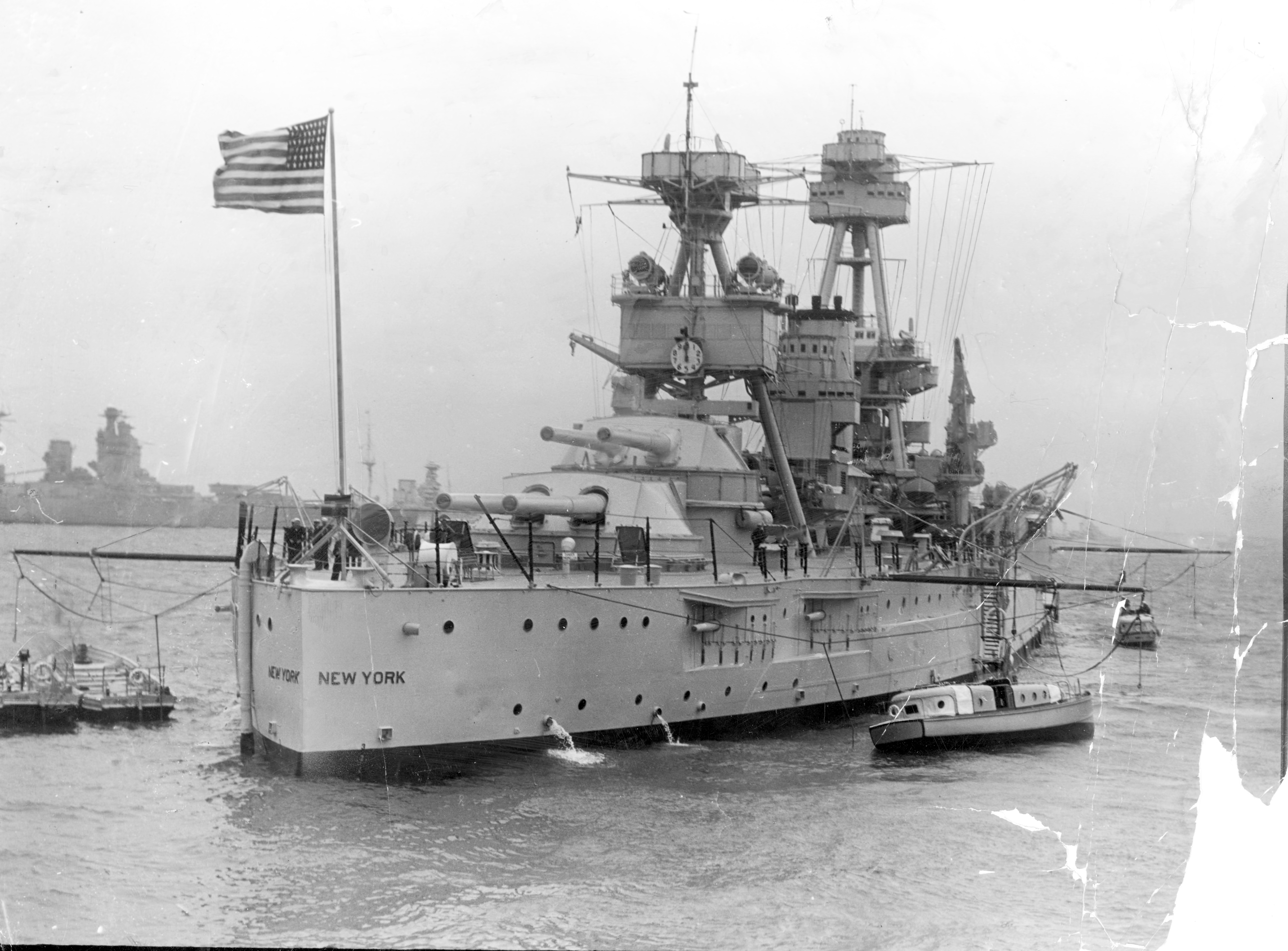
USS New York at the Spithead Naval Review

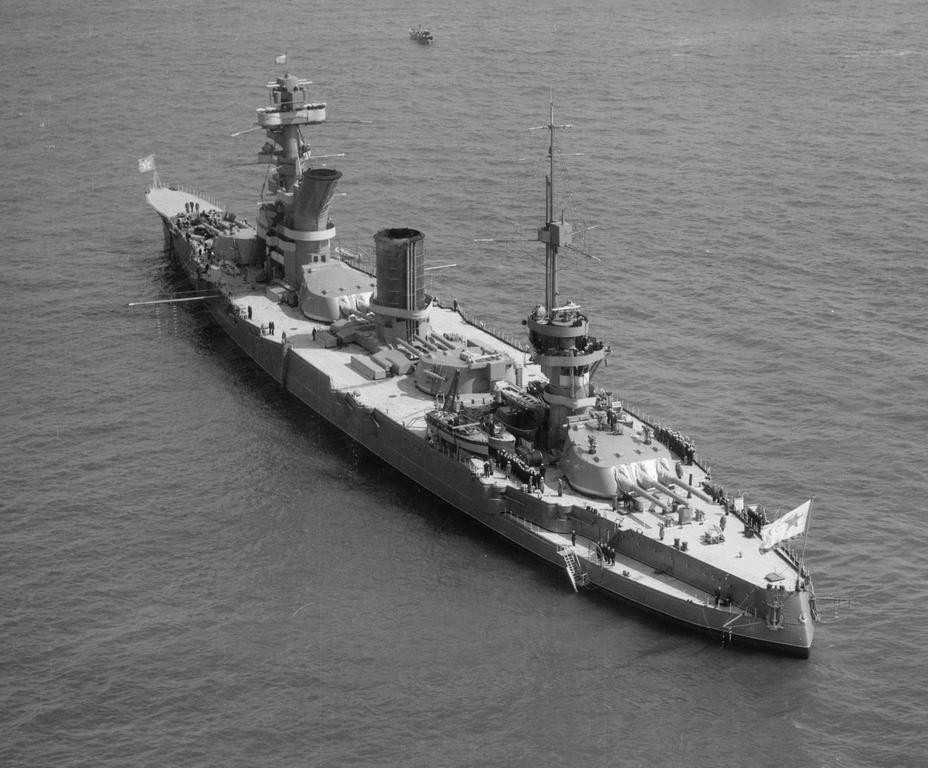
Marat at Spithead for the 1937 Fleet Review

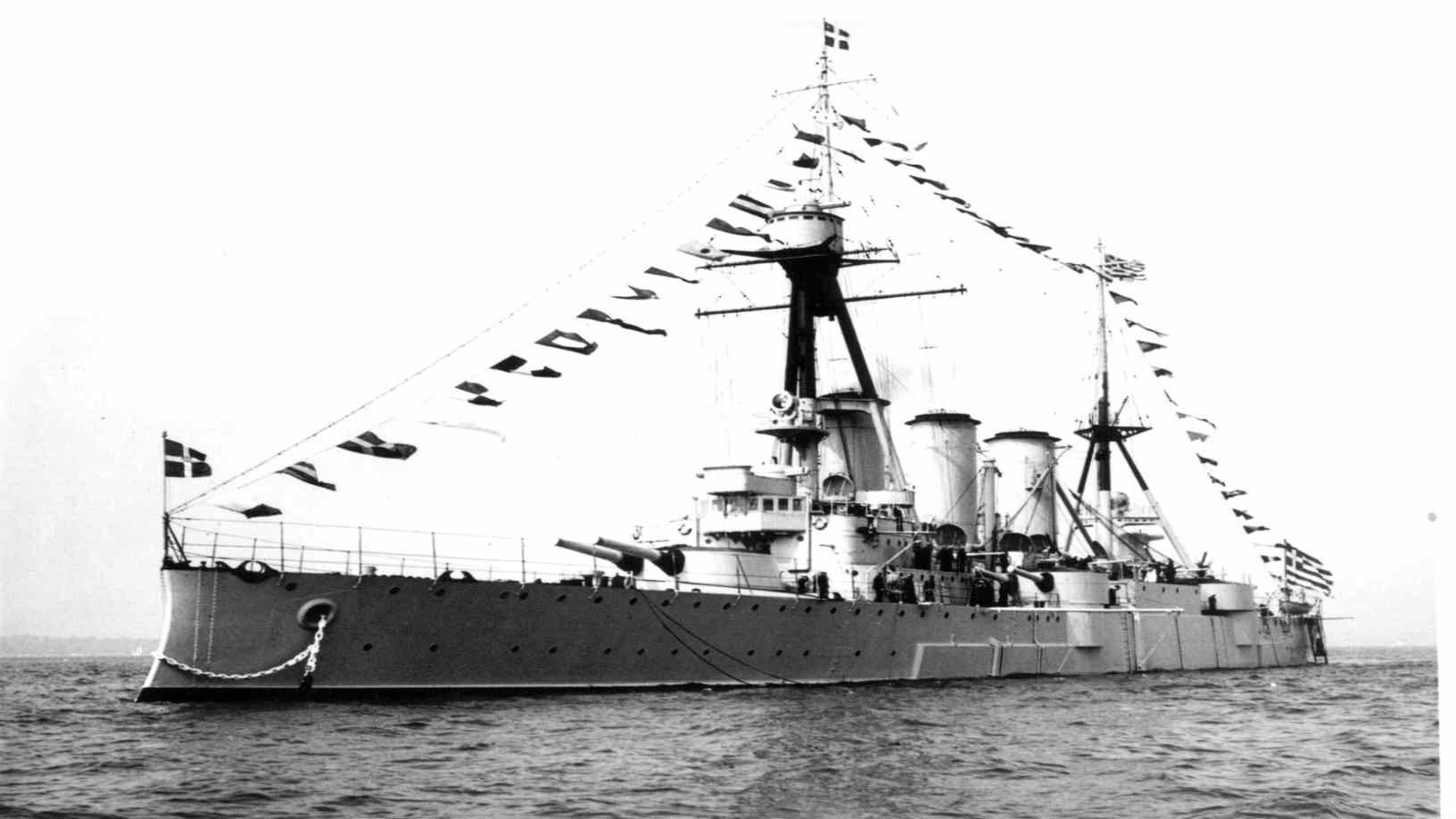
Averof at Coronation Naval Review, Spithead, 1937

== See also ==
- Coronation of the British monarch
- Coronation Scot
- The Coronation (train)
- Canadian Coronation Contingent
