= Rolling Down to Rio =

Part of the Just So Songs poetry collection

"Rolling Down To Rio"

Song
- Genre: English folk song
- Songwriter: Rudyard Kipling

"Roll Down to Rio", also known as "The Beginning of the Armadillos", is part of the Just So Songs poetry collection. It was set to music (by Edward German), which has been recorded by Peter Bellamy, Dave Webber and Anni Fentiman, The Young'uns, and Peter Dawson.

Being a well-documented song publicised by Mudcat, and Mainly Norfolk, the song was recorded by Jon Boden and Oli Steadman for inclusion in their respective lists of daily folk songs "A Folk Song a Day" and "365 Days of Folk".
