= David Russell Hulme =

Welsh conductor and musicologist

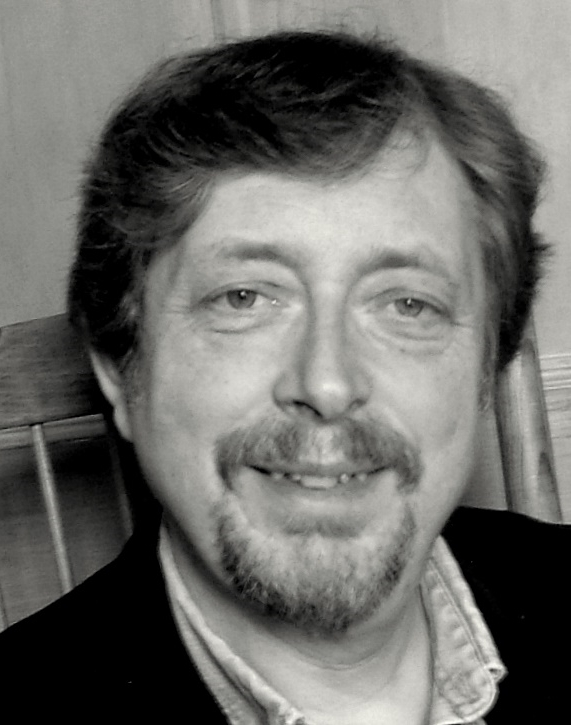
David Russell Hulme in 2009

David Russell Hulme (born 19 June 1951) is a Welsh conductor and musicologist. He is an emeritus reader and the former director of music at Aberystwyth University and is known for his research and publications on the music of Arthur Sullivan, the composer of the Gilbert and Sullivan comic operas. He is also an authority on the music of Edward German.

== Life and career ==
Born in Machynlleth, Wales, the son of Lena Catherine née Cudworth (1925–1994) and Albert Lumley Lewis Hulme (1919–2009) and the grandson of railway engineer Albert Edward Hulme. Russell Hulme studied music under Ian Parrott at the University College of Wales, Aberystwyth, and studied conducting with Sir Adrian Boult. He gained MA and PhD degrees for his research into British Music. He completed his PhD thesis, "The operettas of Sir Arthur Sullivan: a study of available autograph scores", in 1986 at the University of Wales. It has been referred to in numerous G&S symposia and newsletters.

Russell Hulme regularly conducts throughout Britain and Ireland and in 2019 appeared for the first time as guest conductor with the Zaporozhye Symphony Orchestra in Ukraine. In 2001 he toured Australia and New Zealand, where he conducted the State Orchestra of Victoria (now Orchestra Victoria), the Auckland Philharmonia and the Sydney Opera House Orchestra. He has worked with the Carl Rosa Opera Company as conductor and chorus-master, including the company's tours of North America in 2004 and 2006. Russell Hulme was the Director of Music at North Hertfordshire College, Hitchin, Hertfordshire, for almost ten years, leaving to become, in 1992, the first director of music at Aberystwyth University, where he was appointed emeritus reader following his retirement in July 2020. For the university he conducted the symphony orchestra (Philomusica) and the University Singers (formerly known as the Choral Union). He also became conductor of the Aberystwyth Choral Society in 2002. He was the recipient of the 2012 Glyndŵr Award for "an Outstanding Contribution to the Arts in Wales" presented at the 2012 Machynlleth Festival. He has published articles for the New Grove Dictionary of Music and Musicians and the BBC Proms, and for Oxford University Press, he edited a 2006 edition of William Walton's Symphony No. 2 and a 2002 score of Haydn's Missa in tempore belli (Mass in Time of War), among other pieces. His reconstructions of partially lost scores and his orchestrations have been performed on recordings and radio broadcasts. His orchestrations include music composed by Neil Brand. He is a Fellow of the Royal Society of Arts.

Opera magazine described Russell Hulme as "our leading authority on Sullivan's manuscripts". He has acted as consultant on Sullivan scores with such opera companies as Welsh National Opera (Charles Mackerras's The Yeomen of the Guard), English National Opera (the Ken Russell/Jane Glover Princess Ida), New Sadler's Wells Opera and D'Oyly Carte Opera Company. He edited Sullivan's music and advised for Mike Leigh's 1999 film Topsy-Turvy. In 2000 Oxford University Press published his critical edition of the full and piano-vocal scores of Ruddigore (revised and reissued in 2017), and the same year, his edition of the rediscovered Sullivan D minor string quartet was published. Russell Hulme has written articles on Gilbert and Sullivan and other areas of British music, and he has lectured at the International Gilbert and Sullivan Festival, where he also conducted a 2009 professional revival of Princess Ida and a production of The Arcadians. He has reconstructed songs cut from Gilbert and Sullivan operas where the music had been partially lost, including the Duke's first act aria from Patience. He was also Consultant Editor to the 2016 Oxford University Press edition of The Yeomen of the Guard, edited by Colin Jagger.

He is also a leading authority on the music of Edward German. He was Senior Music Advisor and a conductor at the Sir Edward German Music Festivals at Whitchurch, Shropshire in 2006, 2009 and 2014 and created The Edward German Archive, a collection of the composer's manuscripts and papers now held by the British Library. Russell Hulme conducted (and also edited the score and wrote liner notes for) the first complete recording of Tom Jones, by Edward German, released by Naxos in 2009. AllMusic rates the recording four stars out of five. It reached No. 3 in the UK classical charts. He also prepared performing editions of German's scores for recordings by the BBC Concert Orchestra, with John Wilson conducting, including a reconstructed orchestration for the "Marche Solonnelle", which had never been recorded.
