= The Rival Poets =

The Rival Poets, or the Love Charm is an English comic opera in two acts by Edward German to a libretto by W. H. Scott. The opera was first performed under the title The Two Poets at the Royal Academy of Music in London in July 1886.

== Background ==
The opera, Edward German's first, was written while he was trying out various forms of composition during his continued studies of composition at the Royal Academy while a sub-professor. German called it an "opera de salon". It was written for just six soloists and two-piano accompaniment, over a three-year period, most of the writing taking place during holiday times. The opera is set in "an imaginary Anglo-Swiss republic," and the plot has been described as being similar to Gilbert and Sullivan's Patience.

The first act was premièred at the end of the Spring 1886 semester at the Academy, followed by a full performance that July, and another in St. George's Hall, Langham Place, near the end of the year. The piece was then toured by Academy students that Fall.

Presumably due to the success of The Emerald Isle, the first opera to which German contributed since The Two Poets, German revised and expanded The Two Poets, and the opera was revived as The Rival Poets, or the Love Charm at St. George's Hall in 1901, at which time it was published by Boosey & Co. under its new title.

In June 1928, the year of German's knighthood, the BBC produced a concert performance for their programming. For this version, German also wrote the narration for the announcer.

Scott, the librettist, was a lifelong friend of German's, later writing the first full-length biography of the composer in 1932.

== Roles ==
- Paul Gervais, a village magnate and oligarch
- Toinette, his supposed daughter
- Victor Bonheur, a mountaineer
- Jeanne, a duenna
- Carol Cornay, a poet
- Comte de Luron, an aged traveller, worn with care, but wearing the marks of nobility

In later productions, the Comte de Luron was deleted, and Jeanne was renamed Suzanne.
