= Coronation March (Edward German) =

The Coronation March is a piece for full orchestra composed by Edward German in 1911 upon invitation for the coronation ceremonies of King George V of the United Kingdom and Queen Mary. The march and its accompanying hymn, "Veni Creator Spiritus," were partly derived from the composer's incidental music to Henry Irving's 1892 production of Henry VIII.

In addition to serving as one of several marches during the actual coronation service, the Coronation March was performed on a number of other royal occasions, most significantly later in 1911 for the Delhi Durbar service, where George and Mary were presented as Emperor and Empress of India, and again in 1937 during the coronation service of George VI of the United Kingdom for the entrance of Queen Mary, by then the Queen Mother.
