= Imperial March (Elgar) =

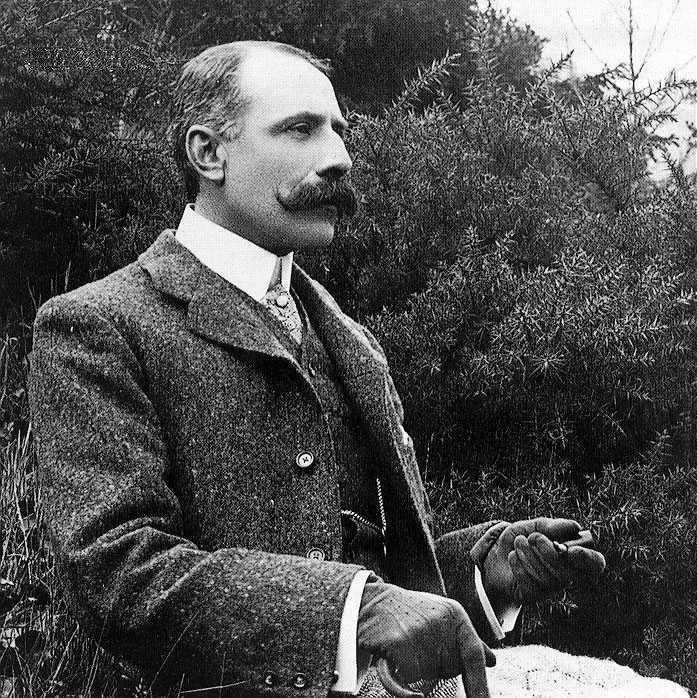
Edward Elgar, c. 1900

Imperial March is a piece for full orchestra written by the English composer Edward Elgar to celebrate the Diamond Jubilee of Queen Victoria in 1897, as his Op. 32.

In 1896 the publisher Novello's requested that he write an 'Imperial March' for the occasion, as well as a cantata based on the story of St. George and the Dragon. The first performance of the march was at a Crystal Palace concert on 19 April 1897, conducted by August Manns. It was played by massed bands at the Crystal Palace a week later, at a Royal Garden Party on 28 June (the actual anniversary of the Queen's coronation), at a State Concert on 18 June and at the Albert Hall (by the Royal Artillery Band) on 24 October. The music created a great impression as popular music for the mood of the public at the time, and made his name widely known in London.

== Instrumentation ==
The work is written for an orchestra consisting of 2 flutes (2nd doubling piccolo), 2 oboes, 2 clarinets in B♭, 2 bassoons, contrabassoon, 4 horns, 2 trumpets in B♭, 3 trombones, tuba, 3 timpani, percussion (bass drum, cymbals, and side drum) and the string section.

== Structure ==
Pomposo 4/4 B♭ major

Ex. 1. The opening, quiet and noble, is developed in a lively festive way:

Ex. 2. The middle section, in E♭ major, has violins and clarinets introduce a new theme for development:

After the recapitulation of Ex. 1, Ex. 2 leads into the coda, which mainly uses Ex. 1 and magnificently concludes the work.

Average performance needs approximately 5 minutes.
