= Edward German =

English musician and composer (1862–1936)

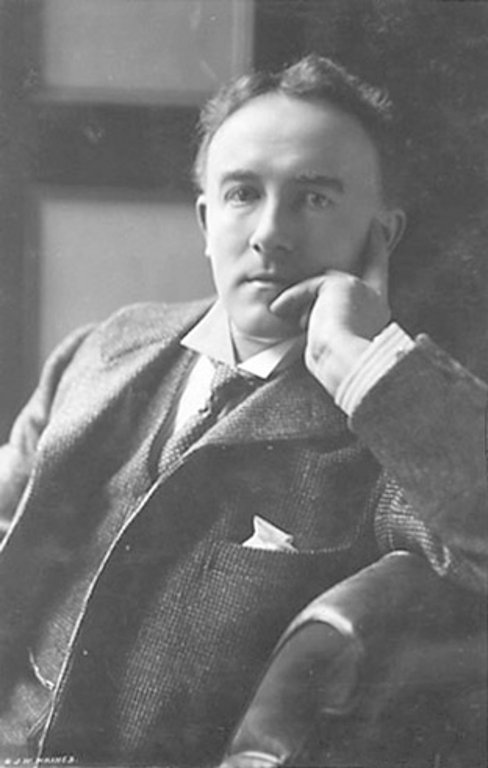
Sir Edward German

Sir Edward German (born German Edward Jones; 17 February 1862 – 11 November 1936) was an English musician and composer of Welsh descent, best remembered for his extensive output of incidental music for the stage and as a successor to Arthur Sullivan in the field of English comic opera. Some of his light operas, especially Merrie England, are still occasionally performed.

As a youth, German played the violin and led the town orchestra of Whitchurch, Shropshire. He also began to compose music. While performing and teaching violin at the Royal Academy of Music, German began to build a career as a composer in the mid-1880s, writing serious music as well as light opera. In 1888, he became music director of the Globe Theatre in London. He provided popular incidental music for many productions at the Globe and other London theatres, including Richard III (1889), Henry VIII (1892) and Nell Gwynn (1900). He also wrote symphonies, orchestral suites, symphonic poems and other works. He also wrote a considerable body of songs, piano music, and symphonic suites and other concert music, of which his Welsh Rhapsody (1904) is perhaps best known.

German was engaged to finish The Emerald Isle after the death of Arthur Sullivan in 1900, the success of which led to more comic operas, including Merrie England (1902) and Tom Jones (1907). He also wrote the Just So Song Book in 1903 to Rudyard Kipling's texts and continued to write orchestral music. German wrote little new music of his own after 1912, but he continued to conduct until 1928, the year in which he was knighted.

== Life and career ==
German was born German Edward Jones in Whitchurch, Shropshire, the second of five children and the elder of two sons of John David Jones, a liquor merchant, brewer, church organist and lay preacher at the local Congregational chapel, and Elizabeth (Betsy) Cox (died 1901), a teacher of Bible classes for young women. His first name was an anglicised form of the Welsh name "Garmon." His parents called him Jim. He began to study piano and organ with his father at the age of five. At the age of six, he formed a boys' concert band to perform locally, teaching himself the violin, composition, and music arrangement in the process. He later sang alto in the church choir and participated in family entertainments above his uncle's grocery shop, often playing piano duets and performing comic sketches with his elder sister, Ruth, who died when he was 15. He also wrote comic poems. His younger sisters were named Mabel and Rachel.

In his mid-teens, German's parents attempted to apprentice him to a shipbuilding firm, as they believed their son had an aptitude for engineering. His studies at a boarding-school in Chester had been delayed by a serious illness, however, and so he was turned away as too old to begin an apprenticeship. In his teens he formed a second band, a quintette, including himself on the violin, his sister on the pianoforte or the bass, and three friends of the family. He prepared the orchestrations for this band. He also led the town orchestra, did some amateur acting, and sang comic songs in local village halls.

=== The Royal Academy ===
At the age of 18, he studied privately with Walter Cecil Hay, the conductor of the Whitchurch choral society and director of music at St Chad's, Shrewsbury. German entered the Royal Academy of Music, where he eventually changed his name to J. E. German (and later simply Edward German) to avoid confusion with another student named Edward Jones. He continued his studies of violin and organ, also beginning a more formal study of composition under Ebenezer Prout. Many of German's student works were played at Academy concerts.

In 1884, the Academy appointed German a sub-professor of the violin. During his time as an instructor, he was well regarded and won several medals and prizes, such as the Tubbs Bow for his skill with the violin. In 1885, he won the Charles Lucas Medal for his Te Deum for soloists, choir and organ, leading him to change his focus from violin to composition. He soon wrote a light opera, The Two Poets (for four soloists and piano), in 1886, which was produced at the Academy and then performed at St. George's Hall. In 1887, his first symphony, in E Minor, was also performed at the Academy. In 1890 he conducted a revised version of this symphony at the Crystal Palace, while The Two Poets toured successfully in England.

During his time at the Royal Academy, German taught at Wimbledon School and played the violin in theatre orchestras, including the Savoy Theatre. He visited Germany in 1886 and 1888–89 and was impressed by its opera, particularly at Bayreuth. His circle of close friends at the Academy included Dora Bright and Ethel Mary Boyce from Chertsey, Surrey. He and Boyce became engaged. She was also a promising composition student and won the Lady Goldsmid scholarship in 1885, the Sterndale Bennett Prize in 1886 and the Charles Lucas Medal in 1889. Although the engagement was broken off, they remained friends. German never married.

=== Plays and orchestral music ===
After leaving the Academy, German continued to teach at Wimbledon School and to play the violin in orchestras at various London theatres, including the Savoy. In 1888, an introduction by conductor Alberto Randegger to theatre manager Richard Mansfield led to German's appointment as conductor and musical director at the Globe Theatre in London. There he improved the orchestra and began providing incidental music for the theatre's lavish productions, starting with Richard III in 1889. This music was well received (The Times called for a concert suite to be arranged), and the overture soon became popular in concert halls. This eventually led to other incidental music commissions that gained success. In 1892, German composed music for a production of Henry Irving's version of Henry VIII at the Lyceum Theatre, London, where he incorporated elements of traditional old English dance. Within a year, sheet music of the dance numbers from the play's score had sold 30,000 copies. German was by then in great demand to write music for plays. His commissions included Henry Arthur Jones's The Tempter in 1893, Johnston Forbes-Robertson's Romeo and Juliet at the Lyceum in 1895, Herbert Beerbohm Tree's productions of As You Like It (1896) and Much Ado about Nothing (1898), and Anthony Hope's English Nell (later known as Nell Gwynn) in 1900, starring Marie Tempest.

At the same time, German was writing music for the concert hall, sometimes adapting music from his theatrical scores. His Gipsy Suite met with success similar to that of his overture to Richard III and his popular Henry VIII and Nell Gwynn dances. All were written in "a distinctive, if limited, 'olde English' manner, a species of musical mock Tudor with which German came to be particularly associated." He also wrote a number of successful drawing-room songs and solo piano pieces during this time. The success of German's theatrical and concert hall music led to his receiving commissions from orchestral music festivals, including his second symphony for the Norwich Festival in 1893. The young critic George Bernard Shaw complained that German's symphonies were limited by the composer's indulgence in a theatricality out of place in symphonic writing. German was thin-skinned, and after receiving this criticism, he wrote no more symphonies. German tried to avoid this charge in the future by characterising his large-scale four-movement works as "symphonic suites". Successful orchestral works included suites for the Leeds Festival in 1895 and The Seasons for Norwich in 1899, and a symphonic poem, Hamlet, at Birmingham in 1897, conducted by Hans Richter. He had planned a violin concerto for the 1901 Leeds Festival, but this was never completed, as German instead turned to light opera. In 1902, he produced a Rhapsody on March Themes for the Brighton Festival.

=== Comic operas ===
Though German had little experience with opera or choral music, Richard D'Oyly Carte invited him to finish Arthur Sullivan's The Emerald Isle for the Savoy Theatre after Sullivan's death in 1900. He accepted, giving up his violin concerto commission for the Leeds Festival to meet the deadlines. The success of his score for the opera (which was performed into the 1920s) opened up a new career for him. His next comic opera, in 1902, was Merrie England, with Basil Hood, the librettist for The Emerald Isle. This was perhaps German's greatest success, and its dance music was popular separately. It was revived frequently, becoming a light-opera standard in Britain, while several of its songs, including "The English Rose", "O Peaceful England" and "The Yeomen of England", remained popular until the middle of the 20th century. Merrie England has been so frequently chosen by amateur groups in England that it probably has been performed more often than any other British opera or operetta written in the 20th century.

Gilbert, Workman and German at a rehearsal

After this, German and Hood collaborated again in 1903 to write A Princess of Kensington. This opera was unsuccessful, although it toured briefly and had a New York production. German turned to other endeavours, composing music to Rudyard Kipling texts, including the twelve songs in the Just So Song Book in 1903. He also received a steady flow of orchestral commissions, leading to works such as his Welsh Rhapsody for the Cardiff Festival in 1904, featuring as its climax "Men of Harlech".

German returned to writing comic operas, achieving another success with Tom Jones for the Apollo Theatre in 1907, produced by Robert Courtneidge for the Fielding bicentenary. The score is one of German's finest works. It received a production in New York, with German conducting, and was performed for decades, spawning separate performances of its dance music. He next collaborated with W. S. Gilbert on his final (and unsuccessful) opera, Fallen Fairies, at the Savoy in 1909. With German's agreement, Gilbert cast his protege, Nancy McIntosh, as the Fairy Queen, Selene. Critics found her performance weak. Shortly after the opening, the producer C. H. Workman, acting at the request of the syndicate he had gathered, replaced McIntosh with Amy Evans and asked for restoration of a song that Gilbert had cut during rehearsals. Gilbert was outraged and threatened to sue, demanding that German join him. This placed German in a distressing position, and the composer, who habitually preferred to avoid legal battles, declined. In maintaining the Savoy tradition of comic opera, German was composing a style of piece for which public taste had dwindled as fashions in musical theatre had changed with the new century.

=== Later years ===
In the wake of the failure of Fallen Fairies and his unhappy experience with it, German effectively ended his career as a composer of new works, only returning to composition on a few rare occasions. In 1911 he became the first composer to write music for a British film; he was commissioned for 50 guineas to write 16 bars of music for the coronation scene in the film Henry VIII. The same year, he composed his march and hymn for the coronation of King George V.

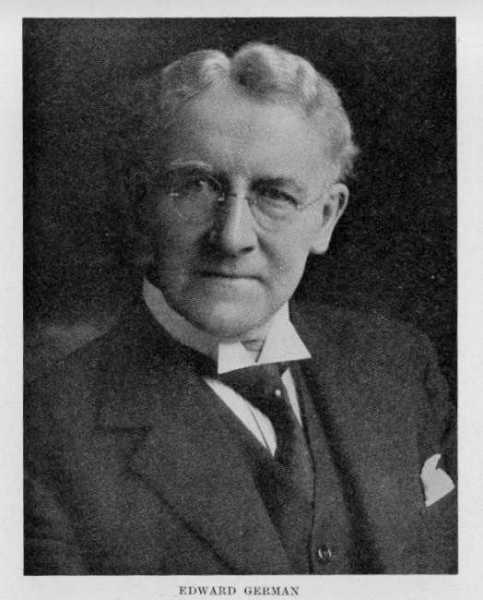
German in later years

Among the few works of his later years was the Theme and Six Diversions in 1919, and his final major work, the Othello-inspired tone poem The Willow Song in 1922. After that, German all but ceased composing. Correspondence shows that he felt uncomfortable with the changing musical styles, such as jazz and modernist classical music. Like Sullivan before him, he regretted that his popularity stemmed mostly from his comic operas. However, German was a perfectionist and continually revised his works and produced new arrangements for publication. He also recorded some of them and encouraged their production and broadcast on the radio.

German lived, from 1886, in Hall Road, Maida Vale, near Lord's Cricket Ground, London, where he was an enthusiast of that game. He lived a quiet life, enjoying walking, cycling and fishing, though he often attended the theatre. He developed a strong friendship with Sir Edward Elgar. German was injured in a road accident during World War I, but continued to be a highly sought-after conductor, accepting many conducting engagements, until he suffered an eye condition that left him blind in his right eye in 1928. He was the first British conductor invited by Dan Godfrey to conduct his own music at Bournemouth. Beginning in 1916, he was also one of the first composers to conduct his own music for recording, producing full renderings of Merrie England and Theme and Six Diversions.

German was knighted in 1928, when the respect in which he was held by fellow musicians was shown by the number of eminent musicians who attended the celebratory dinner, including Elgar, Sir Alexander Mackenzie, Sir Hugh Allen, Sir Landon Ronald, and Lord Berners. In 1934 German received the Royal Philharmonic Society's highest honour, its gold medal, presented by Sir Thomas Beecham at an RPS concert. He was elected an Honorary Freeman of the Worshipful Company of Musicians in 1936, and he was a leader of the Performing Rights Society, which fought for composers' rights to fair compensation for the performances of their works.

German died of prostate cancer at his Maida Vale home, aged 74. He was cremated at Golders Green, and his ashes are interred in the Whitchurch cemetery. He left an estate valued at £56,191.

== Legacy ==
German lived long enough to witness the beginning of a decline in the popularity of his orchestral works. A note found after his death bears this poignant message: "I die a disappointed man because my serious orchestral works have not been recognised". However, his best-known orchestral pieces continued to see occasional performances, and his light operas Merrie England and Tom Jones were kept alive by the productions of amateur companies. Beecham recorded his Gipsy Suite in 1956. According to Grove's Dictionary of Music and Musicians, "Merrie England and, to a lesser extent, Tom Jones retained a special place in the affections of native audiences for more than half a century and are still occasionally performed". A recording of his Richard III, Theme and Six Diversions and The Seasons was released by Naxos in 1994, conducted by Andrew Penny. The first complete professional recording of Tom Jones followed in 2009. Dutton Epoch released a selection of German's music, including his Symphony No. 2, in 2007, and a recording of some of his incidental music for plays, together with two marches and a hymn in 2012.

== Analysis ==
The music scholar David Russell Hulme wrote of German that French influences are clearly apparent in his music "and there are even occasional reminders of Tchaikovsky, but paradoxically he was, like Elgar, a stylistic cosmopolitan who wrote music that is quintessentially English." Hulme also observes that though he is seen as Sullivan's successor, German's music is quite different in style, and his lyric ballads especially show "a romantic warmth that struck a new note in British operetta". The Times argued that German was so frequently spoken of as Sullivan's successor that his contemporaries failed to notice that he was "an artist of genius" in his own right. Many of German's colleagues in the musical establishment did, however, find his work to be of the highest quality, including Elgar and Sir John Barbirolli. Hulme writes that "German's orchestral music certainly does not deserve the neglect it has suffered, for it still has much to offer modern audiences. Beautifully crafted, colourful and vital, its pleasing and distinctive personality is still capable of inspiring the kind of affectionate regard it once so readily kindled."

German's music often reflected a romanticised Shakespearian or semi-mythical English merry-making past. This appealed to contemporary taste, as his Three Dances from 'Henry VIII' (1892) was the most frequently performed English orchestral work in the first decade of The Proms, with well over 30 performances between 1895 and 1905, and his Three Dances from 'As You Like It' (1896) were similarly popular.

== Edward German Festival ==
The first Edward German Festival was held in 2006 in German's birth town, Whitchurch, Shropshire. Events included performances by festival patron and cellist, Julian Lloyd Webber and a concert version of German's best-known work, Merrie England. Another festival was held on 23–28 April 2009, sponsored by the Friends of Whitchurch Heritage. This programme included a concert version of Tom Jones (for which a new recording was released by Naxos in 2009) and a school adaptation of Merrie England. Other events featured clarinettist Emma Johnson, German scholar David Russell Hulme and the Hallé Orchestra.

== Works ==
=== Operas ===
- The Two Poets (1886), later revised as The Rival Poets (1901)
- The Emerald Isle (1901; completion of the opera left unfinished by Sullivan at his death)
- Merrie England (1902)
- A Princess of Kensington (1903)
- Tom Jones (1907)
- Fallen Fairies (1909)

=== Incidental music to plays ===
- Richard III (1889)
- Henry VIII (1892)
- The Tempter (1893)
- Romeo and Juliet (1895)
- Michael and his Lost Angel (1896)
- As You Like It (1896)
- Much Ado about Nothing (1898)
- English Nell (1900), later known as Nell Gwyn
- The Conqueror (1905)

=== Orchestral ===
- The Guitar (1883)
- Bolero (1883)
- Symphony No 1 in E minor (1887)
- March Solennelle (1891)
- On German Airs (1891)
- Gipsy Suite (1892)
- Symphony No 2 ("Norwich") in A minor (1893)
- Symphonic Suite in D minor ("Leeds") (1895)
- In Commemoration (1897; revised in 1902 as March Rhapsody on Original Themes)
- Hamlet, Symphonic Poem (1897)
- The Seasons, Symphonic Suite (1899)
- Welsh Rhapsody (1904)
- Coronation March and Hymn (1911)
- The Irish Guards (1918)
- Theme and Six Diversions (1919)
- The Willow Song (1922)
- Cloverley Suite (1934)

=== Choral works and part songs ===
- Te Deum in F (1885)
- The Chase (1886)
- Antigone (c 1887)
- O Lovely May (1894)
- Who is Sylvia? (1894)
- Banks of the Bann (1899)
- Just So Songs (originally for solo voice (1903), part-song arrangements from 1916–1933)
- Canada Patriotic Hymn (1904)
- O Peaceful Night (1904)
- Introit: Bread of Heaven (1908)
- Grace: Non Nobis Domine (1911)
- Pure as the Air (1911)
- The Three Knights (1911)
- Beauteous Morn (1912)
- In Praise of Neptune (1912)
- My Bonnie Lass (1912)
- Sleeping (1912)
- Sweet Day So Cool (1912)
- Morning Hymn (1912)
- Intercessory Hymn: Father Omnipotent (1915)
- London Town (1920)
- Rolling Down to Rio

=== Songs for solo voice ===
- All Friends Around the Wrekin: A Song of Shropshire
- Big Steamers
- Be Well Assured (from The Fringes of the Fleet)
- Have You News of My Boy Jack? (1916)
- Charming Chloe
- Cupid at the Ferry
- Love the Pedlar
- Sea Lullaby
- Heigh Ho
- Bird of Blue
- Glorious Devon
- Who'll Buy My Lavender?
- Recompense

=== Piano ===
- Suite for Pianoforte (1889)
  - Impromptu
  - Valse Caprice
  - Bourrée
  - Elegy
  - Mazurka
  - Tarantella
- Four Pianoforte Duets (1890)
- Graceful Dance in F (1891)
- Polish Dance (1891)
- Valse in A Flat (1891)
- Album Leaf (1892)
- Intermezzo in A Minor (1892)
- Valsette pour Piano (1892)
- Minuet in G (1893)
- Second Impromptu (1894)
- Concert Study in A Flat (1894)
- Gipsy Suite: Four Characteristic Dances – duet (1895)
- Melody in E Flat (1895)
- Suite for Four Hands (1896)
- "Columbine" Air de Ballet (1898)
- Abendlied "Evensong" (1900)
- Melody in E. "The Queen's Carol" (1905)

=== Violin ===
- Nocturne (1882)
- Chanson d'Amour (1880s)
- Barcarolle (1880s)
- Album Leaf (1880s)
- Sprites' Dance (1880s)
- Bolero (1883)
- Scotch Sketch for 2 Violins and Pianoforte (1890)
- Moto Perpetuo Pour Violin Accompagnement de Piano (1890)
- Souvenir for Violin and Pianoforte (1896)
- Song without Words (1898)
- Three Sketches: "Valsette", "Souvenir", "Bolero" (1897)

=== Woodwind, chamber music and organ ===
- Saltarello (for flute and piano) (1889)
- Pastorale and Bourrée (for woodwinds) (1891)
- Suite: Three Pieces (for woodwinds) (1892)
  - Valse Gracieuse
  - Souvenir
  - Gypsy Dance
- Andante and Tarantella (for woodwinds) (1892)
- Romance (for woodwinds) (1892)
- Intermezzo (for woodwinds) (1894)
- Early One Morning (for woodwinds) (1900)
- Trio in D for Violin, Violoncello, and Pianoforte (c. 1883)
- Serenade (for chamber ensemble) (1890s)
- Andante in B Flat (for organ) (1880s)

== Sources ==
- Russell Hulme, David (2001). "German, Edward". In Sadie, Stanley; Tyrrell, John (eds.). The New Grove Dictionary of Music and Musicians (2nd ed.). London: Macmillan. ISBN 978-1-56159-239-5.
- Rees, Brian (1986). A Musical Peacemaker: The Life and Work of Sir Edward German. Abbotsbrook: Kensal Press. ISBN 0-946041-49-0.
