= Apung 1 =

Museum ship in Indonesia

Coordinates: 5.546381°N 95.306783°E

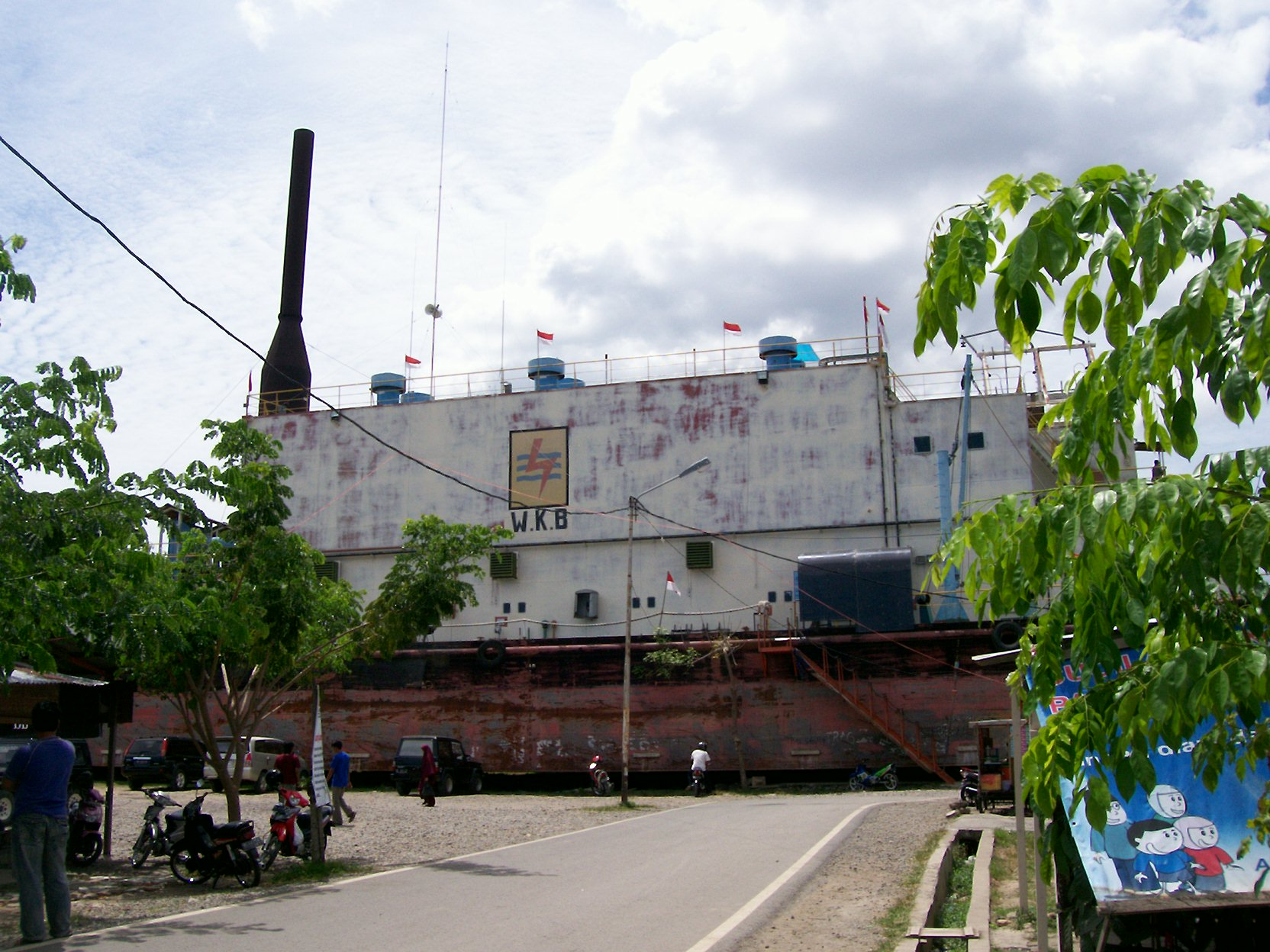
- PLTD Apung 1 in Punge Blang Cut village, Banda Aceh

History
- Name: Apung 1
- Status: Museum ship

General characteristics
- Type: Diesel generator barge
- Tonnage: 2,600 GT

PLTD Apung 1, also known as Kapal Apung, is a tourist attraction and former electric generator barge, stranded on dry land in Banda Aceh, Sumatra, Indonesia. The 2,600-ton vessel was at sea when the 2004 Indian Ocean earthquake and tsunami occurred, with the tsunami carrying her two to three kilometres (1.2 to 1.9 mi) inland. The Apung 1, owned by the government power generating corporation Perusahaan Listrik Negara (PLN), crashed into two homes when she was washed ashore, killing those inside.

The government donated Apung 1 to Aceh during the Aceh conflict between the government and the Free Aceh Movement (Gerakan Aceh Merdeka, or GAM). In 2012–2013, the boat was renovated and now features two towers, a monument, a flying walk, a jogging area, and a fountain. The vessel is now open to the public as a tourist attraction, known as the Museum PLTD Apung.
