= John Chroston =

British schoolteacher

John Chroston of Tillicoultry, Clackmannanshire, a biology teacher at Falkirk High School, Scotland, was one of the few tourists present during the Indian Ocean earthquake able to recognize tsunami warning signs and prompt a beach evacuation.

Chroston, then 48 years old, was holidaying at Kamala Bay, near Phuket, Thailand, with his daughter Rebecca and his wife Sandra Adams, a professor at Stirling University. He was taking photographs on the beach when the sea receded, and instantly recognized the early-warning sign for a tsunami. He ran up the beach, sounding the alarm and gathering up his wife and daughter. With the assistance of a Thai doctor, Harpreet Grover, Chroston persuaded a hotel shuttle bus driver to turn his bus around and take passengers to high ground. The bus stopped to pick up a few Thai women and children on the way. It was at one point engulfed by the wave, but he managed to pull through and reached high ground.

Chroston and his family returned to Thailand six months after the tsunami, and as an adult his daughter returned in 2011 to volunteer at a Thai school where many of the students were orphaned by the tsunami.

== See also ==
- Tilly Smith, another foreigner who issued an alert, at Mai Khao Beach
- Smong, a folktale of the Simeulue people about past tsunamis and prepared them with lifesaving instructions on how to evacuate
