= Smith Dharmasaroja =

Thai government official

Smith Dharmasaroja (Thai: สมิทธ ธรรมสโรช; RTGS: Samit Thammasarot; born 6 November 1937) is a Thai government official. In 1998, while serving as a meteorologist, he predicted that an earthquake and tsunami "is going to occur for sure." He advocated tsunami warning systems, but was not taken seriously. After the tsunami of December 2004, which killed over 200,000 people, he was recalled from retirement and charged with development of Thai and regional warning systems.

As chief of the National Disaster Warning Centre in Thailand, Dharmasaroja publicly stated that a solar eclipse could trigger natural disasters such as earthquakes and tsunamis in Thailand, depending on "the time that the sun unleashed its energy."
