= 2004 Indian Ocean earthquake and tsunami =

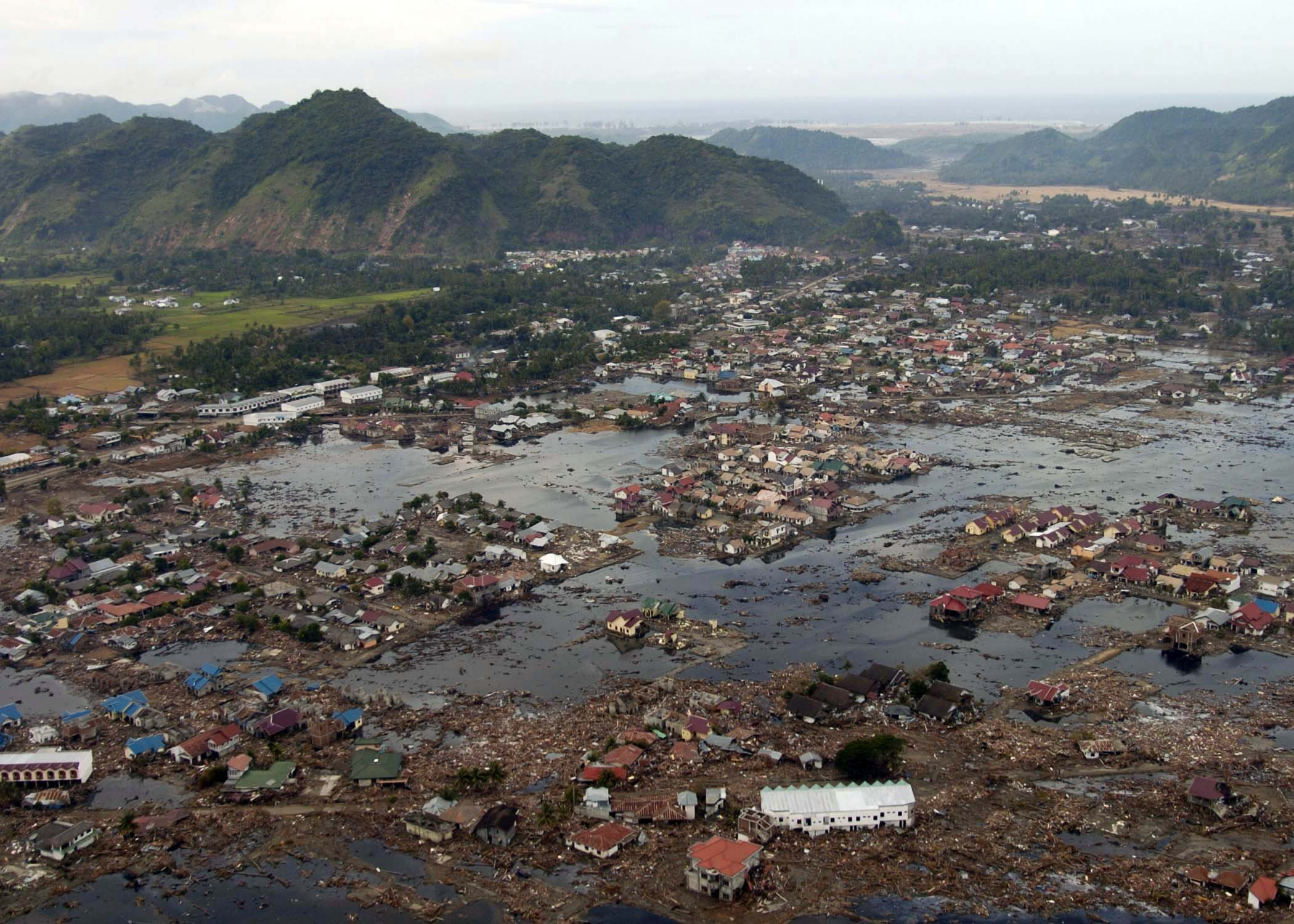
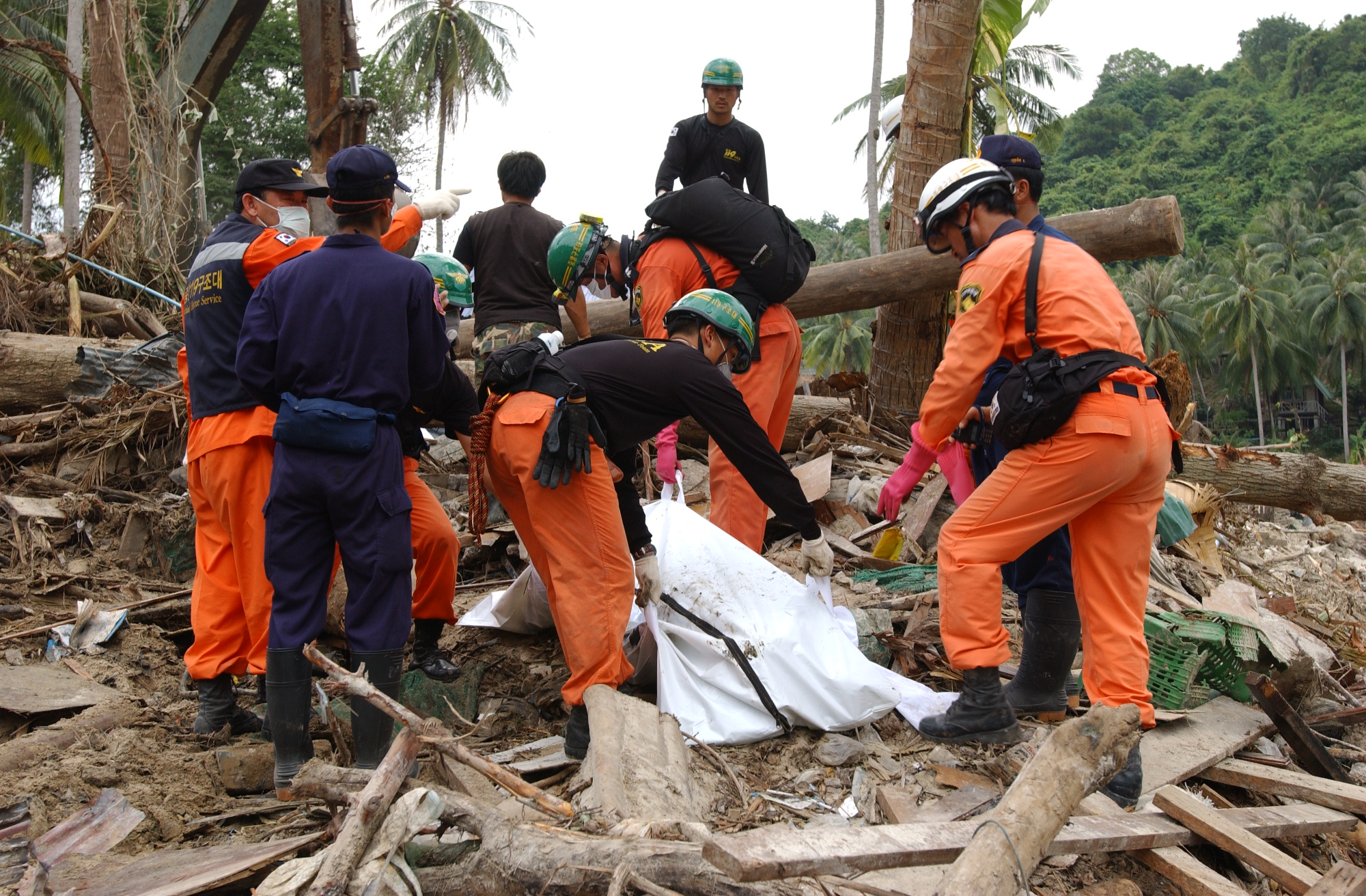
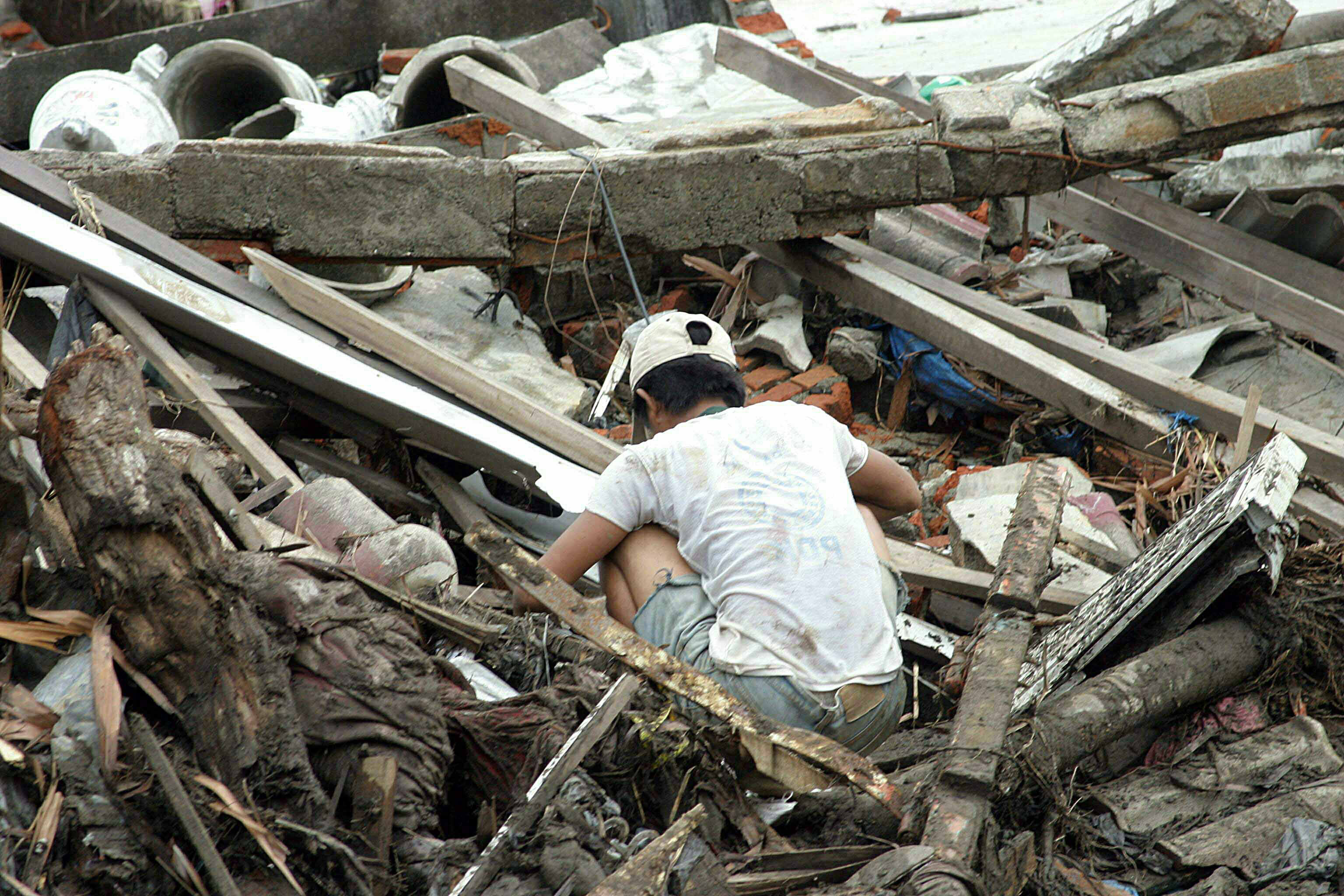
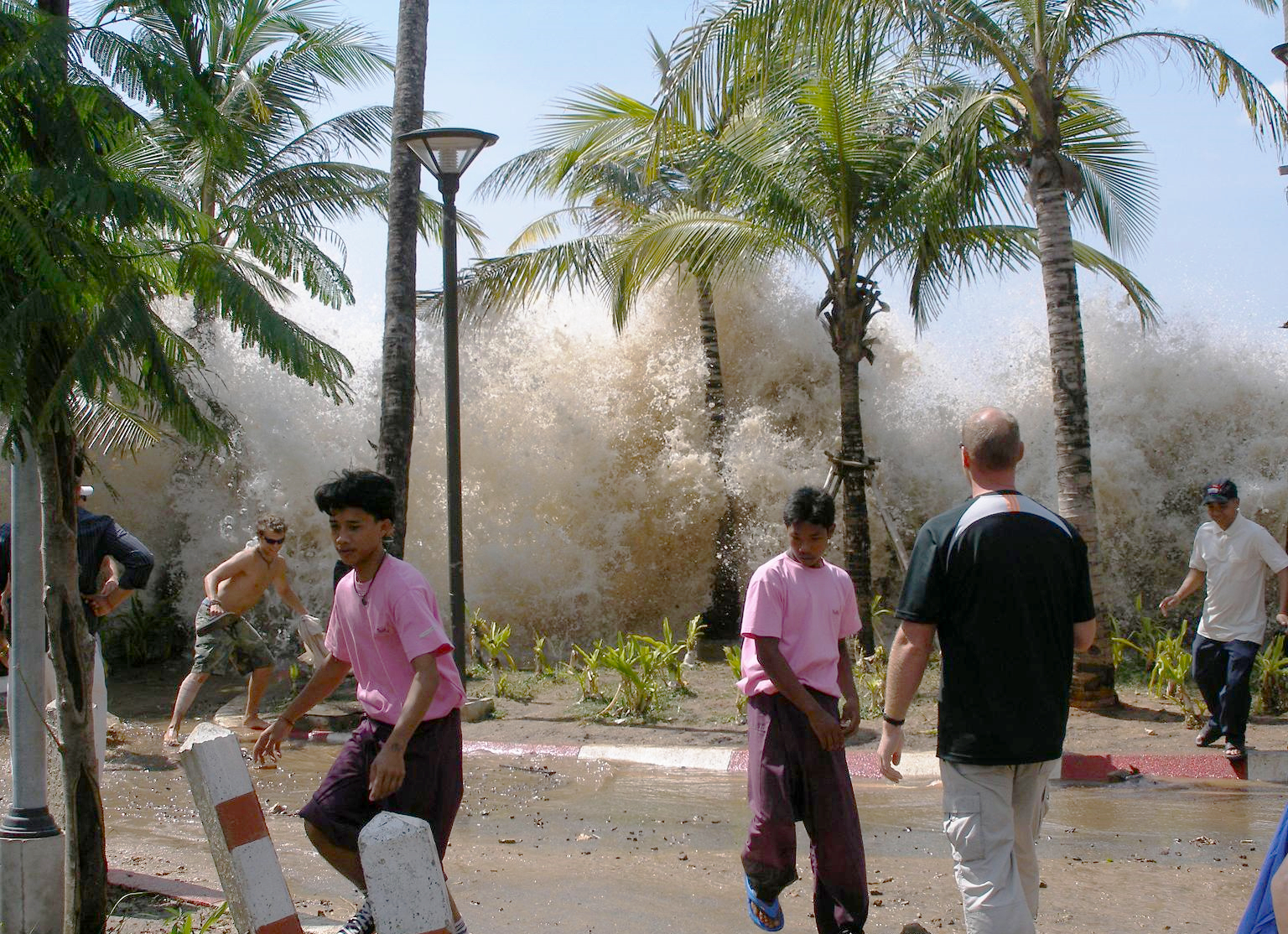
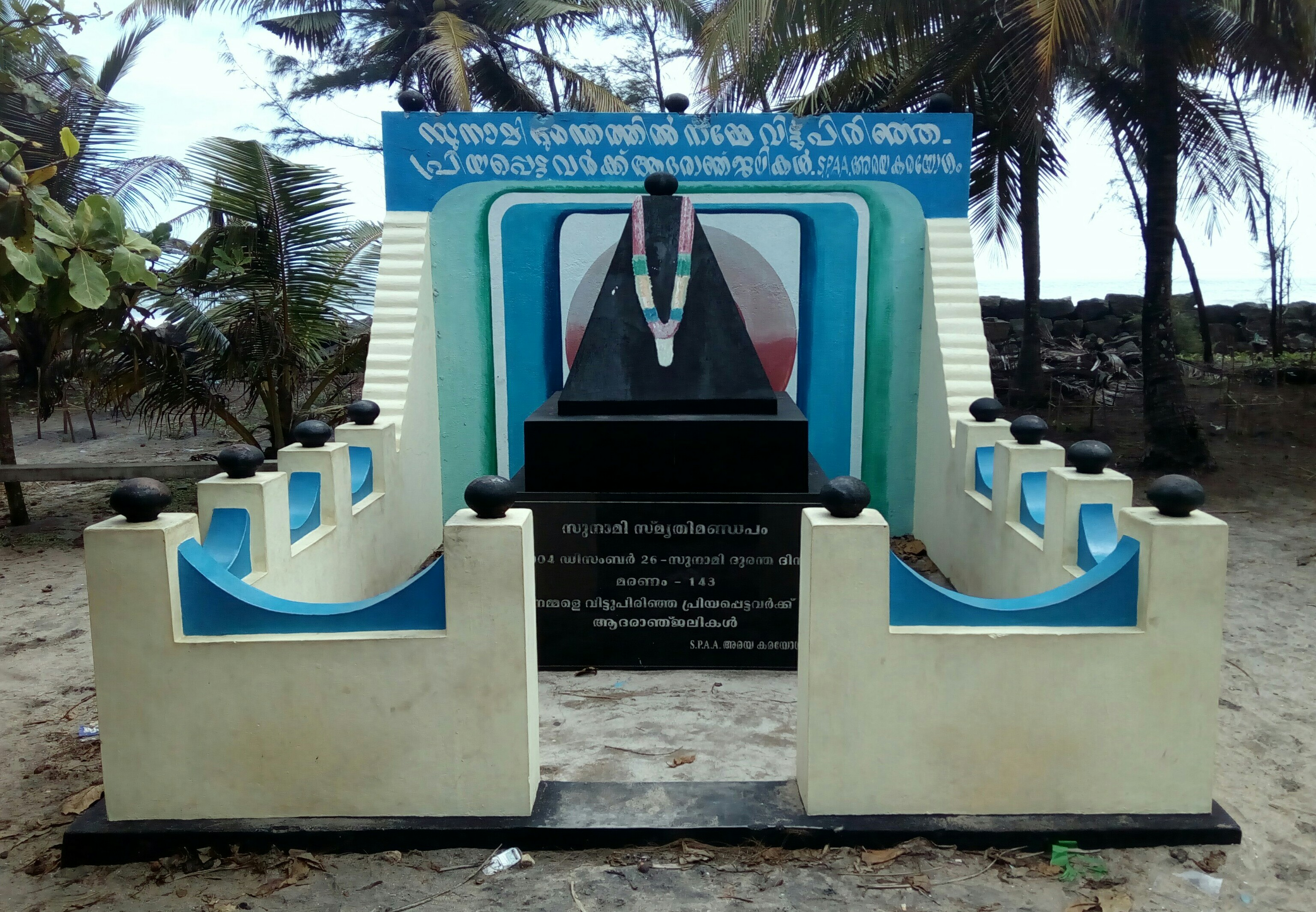
- From top, left to right: Banda Aceh, Indonesia, after the tsunami; Korean rescue workers recovering a body under debris; a man searching through rubble in Meulaboh; people running away from the tsunami; a tsunami memorial in Kerala, India

- Location within Indian Ocean Location within Sumatra Location within Earth
- UTC time: 2004-12-26 00:58:53
- ISC event: 7453151
- USGS-ANSS: ComCat
- Local date: 26 December 2004; 21 years ago
- Local time: 07:28:53 UTC+06:30; 07:58:53 UTC+07:00; 08:58:53 UTC+08:00
- Duration: 10 minutes
- Magnitude: 9.2–9.3 M_{w}
- Depth: 30 km (19 mi)
- Epicentre: 3.316°N 95.854°E
- Type: Megathrust
- Areas affected: Indian Ocean coastline areas
- Total damage: US$15 billion
- Max. intensity: MMI IX (Violent)
- Tsunami: 15 to 30 m (50 to 100 ft); max. 51 m (167 ft)
- Casualties: 227,898 dead

On 26 December 2004, at 07:58:53 local time (UTC+7), a M_{w} 9.2–9.3 earthquake struck with its epicenter off the west coast of Aceh, in northern Sumatra, Indonesia. The undersea megathrust earthquake, known in the scientific community as the Sumatra–Andaman earthquake, was caused by a rupture along the fault boundary between the Burma plate and the Indian plate, and reached a maximum Mercalli intensity of IX in some areas.

The earthquake caused a massive tsunami with waves up to 30 m (100 ft) high, referred to by British and Commonwealth media as the Boxing Day tsunami, after the Boxing Day holiday, or the Asian tsunami, which devastated communities along the surrounding coasts of the Indian Ocean, killing an estimated 227,898 people in 14 countries, especially in Aceh in Indonesia, Sri Lanka, Tamil Nadu in India, and Khao Lak in Thailand. The direct result was severe disruption to living conditions and commerce in coastal provinces of these and other surrounding countries. It is the deadliest tsunami in history, the deadliest natural disaster of the 21st century, and one of the deadliest natural disasters in recorded history. It is also the worst natural disaster in the history of Indonesia, the Maldives, Sri Lanka, and Thailand.

The earthquake itself is the most powerful earthquake ever recorded in Asia, the strongest of the 21st century, and the second- or third-most powerful globally since modern seismography began in 1900. (Note: Estimates of this earthquake are on par or smaller than the 1964 Alaska earthquake (M_{w} 9.2–9.3). Depending on estimates, it could place both earthquakes just behind the 1960 Valdivia earthquake (M_{ww} 9.5–9.6) (i.e. both rank second largest) or one of them as the second or third largest (i.e. 1964 event ranks second followed by 2004 event and vice versa).) It had the longest fault rupture ever observed, between 1,200 to 1,300 kilometres (746 to 808 mi), and had the longest duration of faulting ever observed, lasting at least ten minutes. Its seismic waves caused measurable vibrations throughout the planet, with displacements of up to 10 mm (0.4 in), and also remotely triggered earthquakes as far away as Alaska. Its epicentre was located between Simeulue and mainland Sumatra. The plight of the affected people and countries prompted a worldwide humanitarian response, with donations totaling more than US$14 billion (equivalent to US$24 billion in 2025 currency).

== Earthquake ==
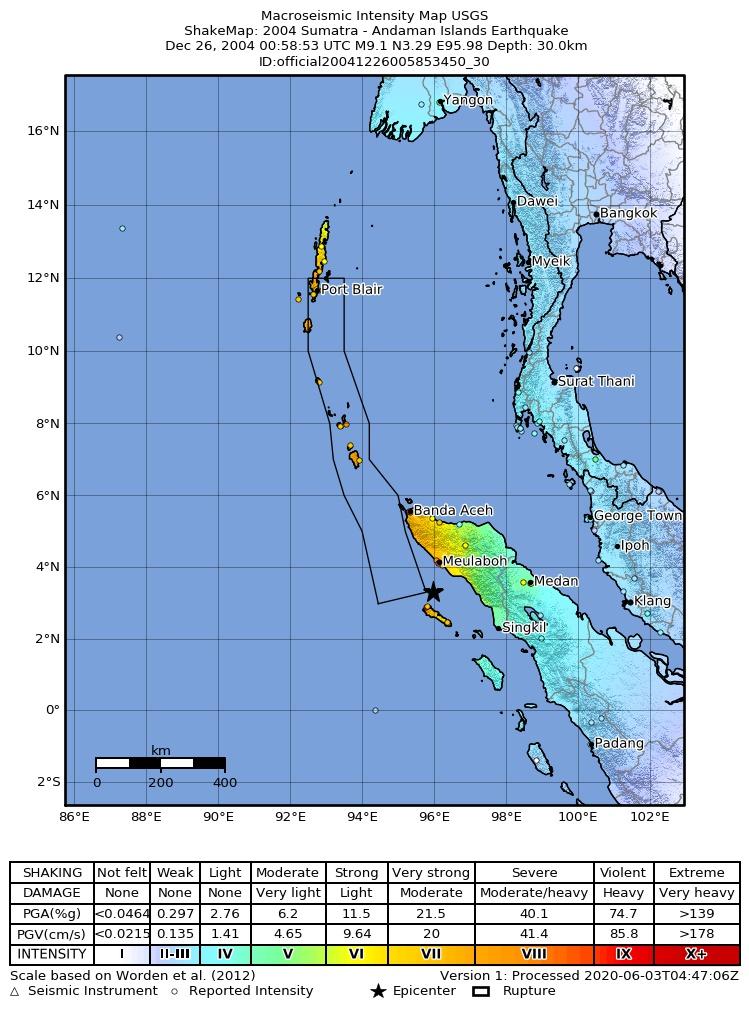
USGS ShakeMap for the event

The 2004 Indian Ocean earthquake was initially documented as having a moment magnitude of 8.8. The United States Geological Survey has its official estimate of M_{w}9.1, but most recent studies suggest that the earthquake was M_{w}9.2–9.3. Hiroo Kanamori of the California Institute of Technology estimates that M_{w}9.2 is the most representative estimate of the earthquake's size. More recent studies estimate the magnitude to be M_{w}9.3. A 2016 study estimated the magnitude to be M_{w}9.25, while a 2021 study revised its 2007 estimate of M_{w}9.1 to a new magnitude of M_{w}9.2.

The hypocentre of the main earthquake was approximately 160 km (100 mi) off the western coast of northern Sumatra, in the Indian Ocean just north of Simeulue island at a depth of 30 km (19 mi) below sea level (initially reported as 10 km or 6.2 mi). The northern section of the Sunda megathrust ruptured over a length of 1,300 km (810 mi). The earthquake (followed by the tsunami) was felt in Bangladesh, India, Malaysia, Myanmar, Thailand, Sri Lanka and the Maldives. Splay faults, or secondary "pop up faults", caused long, narrow parts of the seafloor to pop up in seconds. This rapidly increased the height and speed of the tsunami waves, destroying the nearby Indonesian town of Lhoknga.

Indonesia lies between the Pacific Ring of Fire along the northeastern islands adjacent to New Guinea, and the Alpide belt that runs along the south and west from Sumatra, Java, Bali, Flores to Timor. The 2002 Sumatra earthquake is believed to have been a foreshock, preceding the main event by over two years.

=== Historical comparisons ===
Great earthquakes such as the 2004 Indian Ocean earthquake are generally associated with megathrust events in subduction zones. Their seismic moments can account for a significant fraction of the global seismic moment across century-scale periods. Of all the moment released by earthquakes in the 100 years from 1906 through 2005, roughly one-eighth was due to the 2004 Indian Ocean earthquake. This quake, together with the Great Alaskan earthquake (1964) and the Great Chilean earthquake (1960), account for almost half of the total moment.

Since 1900, the only earthquakes recorded with a greater magnitude were the 1960 Chile earthquake (magnitude 9.5) and the 1964 Alaska earthquake in Prince William Sound (magnitude 9.2). The only other recorded earthquakes of magnitude 9.0 or greater were off Kamchatka, Russia, in November 1952 (magnitude 9.0) and Tōhoku, Japan, in March 2011 (magnitude 9.1). Each of these megathrust earthquakes also spawned tsunamis in the Pacific Ocean. In comparison to the 2004 Indian Ocean earthquake, the death toll from these earthquakes and tsunamis was significantly lower, primarily because of the lower population density along the coasts near affected areas.

Comparisons with earlier earthquakes are difficult, as earthquake strength was not measured systematically until the 1930s. However, historical earthquake strength can sometimes be estimated by examining historical descriptions of the damage caused, and the geological records of the areas where they occurred. Some examples of significant historical megathrust earthquakes are the 1868 Arica earthquake in Peru and the 1700 Cascadia earthquake in western North America.

=== Tectonic plates ===
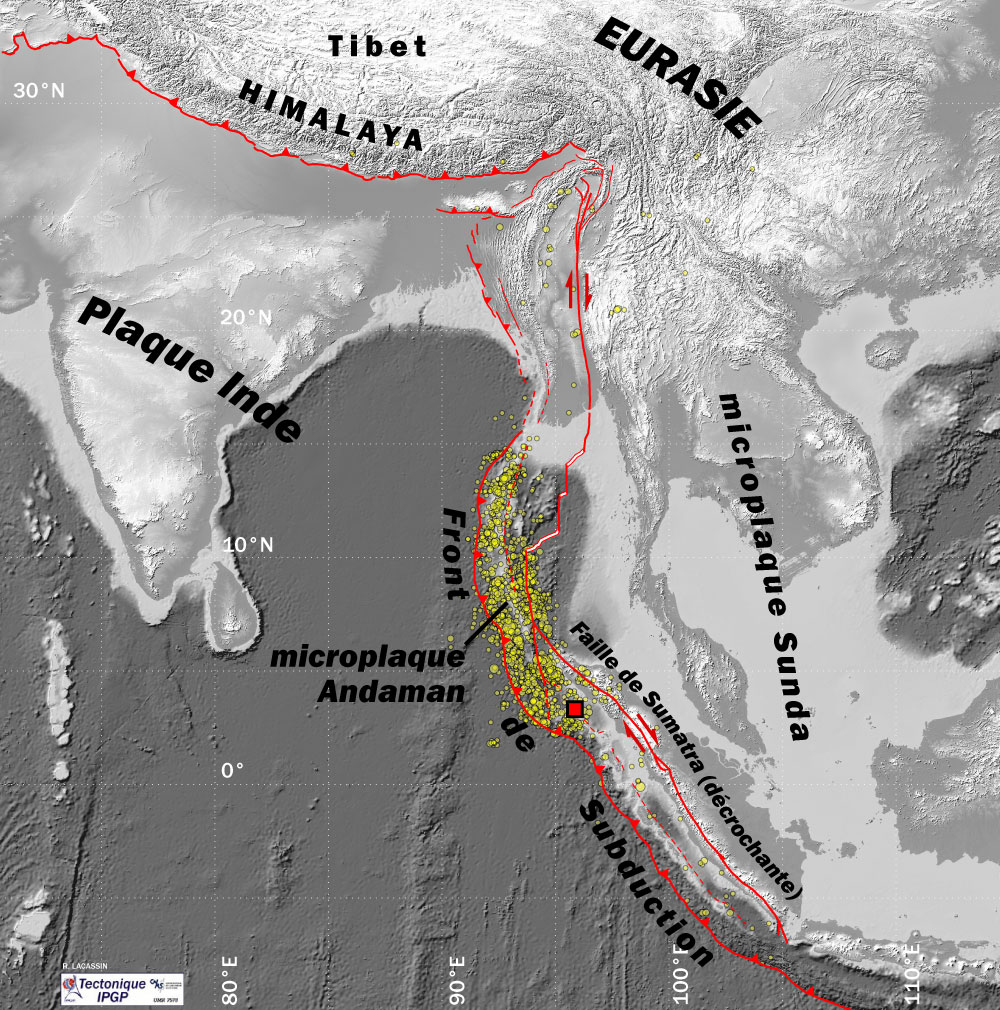
Epicentre and associated aftershocks

The 2004 Indian Ocean earthquake was unusually large in geographical and geological extent. An estimated 1,600 km (1,000 mi) of fault surface slipped (or ruptured) about 15 m (50 ft) along the subduction zone where the Indian plate slides under (or subducts) the overriding Burma plate. The slip did not happen instantaneously but took place in two phases over several minutes: Seismographic and acoustic data indicate that the first phase involved a rupture about 400 km (250 mi) long and 100 km (60 mi) wide, 30 km (19 mi) beneath the sea bed—the largest rupture ever known to have been caused by an earthquake. The rupture proceeded at about 2.8 km/s (1.74 mi/s; 10,100 km/h; 6,260 mph), beginning off the coast of Aceh and proceeding north-westerly over about 100 seconds. After a pause of about another 100 seconds, the rupture continued northwards towards the Andaman and Nicobar Islands. The northern rupture occurred more slowly than in the south, at about 2.1 km/s (1.3 mi/s; 7,600 km/h; 4,700 mph), continuing north for another five minutes to a plate boundary where the fault type changes from subduction to strike-slip (the two plates slide past one another in opposite directions).

The Indian plate is part of the Indo-Australian plate, which underlies the Indian Ocean and Bay of Bengal, and is moving north-east at an average of 60 mm/a (2.4 in/year). The India Plate meets the Burma plate (which is considered a portion of the great Eurasian plate) at the Sunda Trench. At this point, the India Plate subducts beneath the Burma plate, which carries the Nicobar Islands, the Andaman Islands, and northern Sumatra. The India Plate sinks deeper and deeper beneath the Burma plate until the increasing temperature and pressure drive volatiles out of the subducting plate. These volatiles rise into the overlying plate, causing partial melting and the formation of magma. The rising magma intrudes into the crust above and exits the Earth's crust through volcanoes in the form of a volcanic arc. The volcanic activity that results as the Indo-Australian plate subducts the Eurasian plate has created the Sunda Arc.

As well as the sideways movement between the plates, the 2004 Indian Ocean earthquake resulted in a rise of the seafloor by several metres, displacing an estimated 30 km^{3} (7.2 cu mi) of water and triggering devastating tsunami waves. The waves radiated outwards along the entire 1,600 km (1,000 mi) length of the rupture (acting as a line source). This greatly increased the geographical area over which the waves were observed, reaching as far as Mexico, Chile, and the Arctic. The raising of the seafloor significantly reduced the capacity of the Indian Ocean, producing a permanent rise in the global sea level by an estimated 0.1 mm (0.004 in).

=== Aftershocks and other earthquakes ===
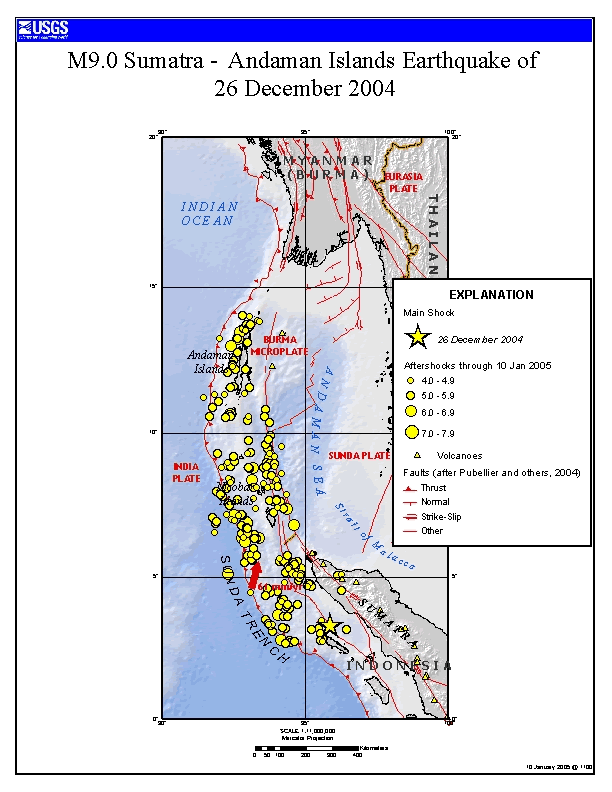
Initial earthquake and aftershocks measuring greater than 4.0 M_{w} from 26 December 2004 to 10 January 2005

Numerous aftershocks were reported off the Andaman Islands, the Nicobar Islands and the region of the original epicentre in the hours and days that followed. The magnitude 8.6 2005 Nias–Simeulue earthquake, which originated off the coast of the Sumatran island of Nias, is not considered an aftershock, despite its proximity to the epicentre, and was most likely triggered by stress changes associated with the 2004 event. The earthquake produced its own aftershocks, some registering a magnitude of as high as 6.9.

Other aftershocks of up to magnitude 7.2 continued to shake the region daily for three or four months. As well as continuing aftershocks, the energy released by the original earthquake continued to make its presence felt well after the event. A week after the earthquake, its reverberations could still be measured, providing valuable scientific data about the Earth's interior.

The 2004 Indian Ocean earthquake came just three days after a magnitude 8.1 earthquake in the sub-antarctic Auckland Islands, an uninhabited region southwest of New Zealand, and Macquarie Island to Australia's south. This is unusual since earthquakes of magnitude eight or more occur only about once per year on average. The U.S. Geological Survey sees no evidence of a causal relationship between these events.

The 2004 Indian Ocean earthquake is thought to have triggered activity in both Leuser Mountain and Mount Talang, volcanoes in Aceh along the same range of peaks, while the 2005 Nias–Simeulue earthquake sparked activity in Lake Toba, a massive caldera in Sumatra.

=== Energy released ===
Aftershocks of 2004 Indian Ocean earthquake

The energy released on the Earth's surface (M_{e}, the energy magnitude, which is the seismic potential for damage) by the 2004 Indian Ocean earthquake was estimated at 1.1×10^{17} joules.

The earthquake generated a seismic oscillation of the Earth's surface of up to 200–300 mm (8–12 in), equivalent to the effect of the tidal forces caused by the Sun and Moon. The seismic waves of the earthquake were felt across the planet, as far away as the U.S. state of Oklahoma, where vertical movements of 3 mm (0.12 in) were recorded. By February 2005, the earthquake's effects were still detectable as a 20 μm (0.02 mm; 0.0008 in) complex harmonic oscillation of the Earth's surface, which gradually diminished and merged with the incessant free oscillation of the Earth more than four months after the earthquake.

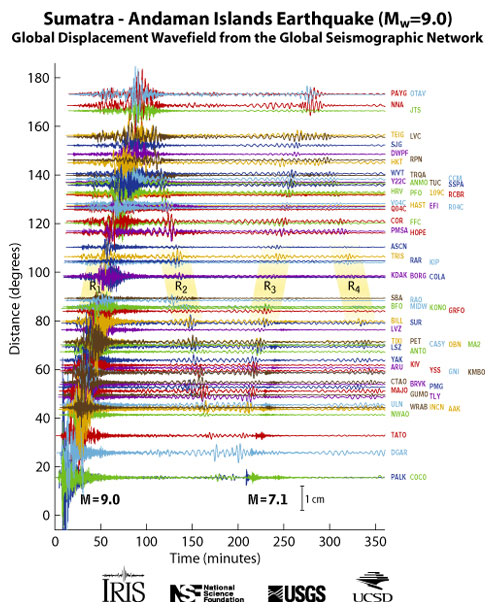
Vertical-component ground motions recorded by the Global Seismographic Network and displayed by the IRIS Consortium

Because of its enormous energy release and shallow rupture depth, the earthquake generated remarkable seismic ground motions around the globe, particularly due to huge Rayleigh (surface) elastic waves that exceeded 10 mm (0.4 in) in vertical amplitude everywhere on Earth. The record section plot displays vertical displacements of the Earth's surface recorded by seismometers from the IRIS/USGS Global Seismographic Network plotted with respect to time (since the earthquake initiation) on the horizontal axis, and vertical displacements of the Earth on the vertical axis (note the 1 cm scale bar at the bottom for scale). The seismograms are arranged vertically by distance from the epicentre in degrees. The earliest, lower amplitude signal is that of the compressional (P) wave, which takes about 22 minutes to reach the other side of the planet (the antipode; in this case near Ecuador). The largest amplitude signals are seismic surface waves that reach the antipode after about 100 minutes. The surface waves can be clearly seen to reinforce near the antipode (with the closest seismic stations in Ecuador), and to subsequently encircle the planet to return to the epicentral region after about 200 minutes. A major aftershock (magnitude 7.1) can be seen at the closest stations starting just after the 200-minute mark. The aftershock would be considered a major earthquake under ordinary circumstances but is dwarfed by the mainshock. The TOPEX/Poseidon and Jason-1 satellites happened to pass over the tsunami as it was crossing the ocean and anomalies in the order of 500 mm (20 in) were measured.

The shift of mass and the massive release of energy slightly altered the Earth's rotation. Weeks after the earthquake, theoretical models suggested the earthquake shortened the length of a day by 2.68 microseconds, due to a decrease in the oblateness of the Earth. It also caused the Earth to minutely "wobble" on its axis by up to 25 mm (1 in) in the direction of 145° east longitude, or perhaps by up to 50 or 60 mm (2.0 or 2.4 in). Because of tidal effects of the Moon, the length of a day increases at an average of 15 microseconds per year, so any rotational change due to the earthquake will be lost quickly. Similarly, the natural Chandler wobble of the Earth, which in some cases can be up to 15 m (50 ft), eventually offset the minor wobble produced by the earthquake.

There was 10 m (33 ft) movement laterally and 4–5 m (13–16 ft) vertically along the fault line. Early speculation was that some of the smaller islands south-west of Sumatra, which is on the Burma plate (the southern regions are on the Sunda plate), might have moved south-west by up to 36 m (120 ft), but more accurate data released more than a month after the earthquake found the movement to be about 0.2 m (8 in). Since movement was vertical as well as lateral, some coastal areas may have been moved to below sea level. The Andaman and Nicobar Islands appear to have shifted south-west by around 1.25 m (4 ft 1 in) and to have sunk by 1 m (3 ft 3 in).

Seismic moment release of the largest earthquakes from 1906 to 2005

In February 2005, the Royal Navy vessel HMS Scott surveyed the seabed around the earthquake zone, which varies in depth between 1,000 and 5,000 m (550 and 2,730 fathoms; 3,300 and 16,400 ft). The survey, conducted using a high-resolution, multi-beam sonar system, revealed that the earthquake had made a considerable impact on the topography of the seabed. 1,500-metre-high (5,000 ft) thrust ridges created by previous geologic activity along the fault had collapsed, generating landslides several kilometres wide. One such landslide consisted of a single block of rock some 100 m (330 ft) high and 2 km (1.2 mi) long. The momentum of the water displaced by tectonic uplift had also dragged massive slabs of rock, each weighing millions of tonnes, as far as 10 km (6 mi) across the seabed. An oceanic trench several kilometres wide was exposed in the earthquake zone.

== Tsunami ==
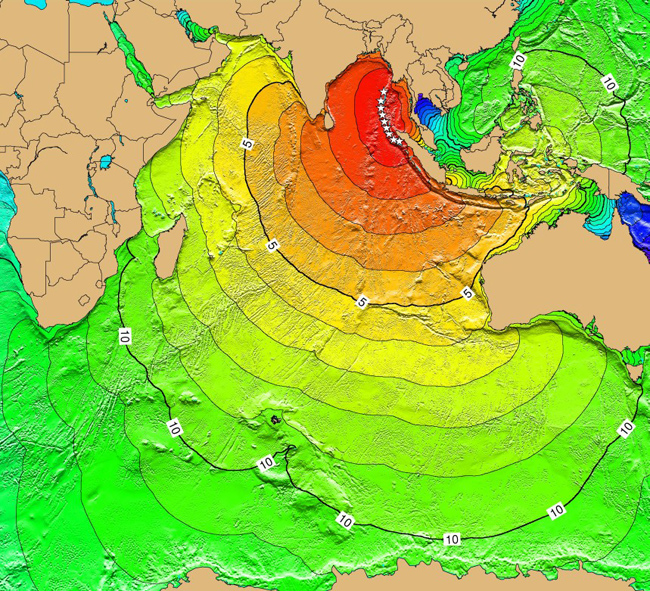
The tsunami's propagation took 5 hours to reach Western Australia, 7 hours to reach the Arabian Peninsula, and did not reach the South African coast until nearly 11 hours after the earthquake

The sudden vertical rise of the seabed by several metres during the earthquake displaced massive volumes of water, resulting in a tsunami that struck the coasts of the Indian Ocean. A tsunami that causes damage far away from its source is sometimes called a teletsunami and is much more likely to be produced by the vertical motion of the seabed than by horizontal motion.

The tsunami, like all the others, behaved differently in deep water than in shallow water. In deep ocean water, tsunami waves form only a low, broad hump, barely noticeable and harmless, which generally travels at the high speed of 500 to 1,000 km/h (310 to 620 mph); in shallow water near coastlines, a tsunami slows down to only tens of kilometres per hour but, in doing so, forms large destructive waves. Scientists investigating the damage in Aceh found evidence that the wave reached a height of 24 m (80 ft) when coming ashore along large stretches of the coastline, rising to 30 m (100 ft) in some areas when travelling inland. Radar satellites recorded the heights of tsunami waves in deep water: the maximum height was at 600 mm (2 ft) two hours after the earthquake, the first such observations ever made.

According to Tad Murty, vice-president of the Tsunami Society, the total energy of the tsunami waves was equivalent to about 5 megatons of TNT (21 PJ), which is more than twice the total explosive energy used during all of World War II (including the two atomic bombs) but still a couple of orders of magnitude less than the energy released in the earthquake itself. In many places, the waves reached as far as 2 km (1.2 mi) inland.

Because the 1,600 km (1,000 mi) fault affected by the earthquake was in a nearly north–south orientation, the greatest strength of the tsunami waves was in an east–west direction. Bangladesh, which lies at the northern end of the Bay of Bengal, had few casualties despite being a low-lying country relatively near the epicentre. It also benefited from the fact that the earthquake proceeded more slowly in the northern rupture zone, greatly reducing the energy of the water displacements in that region.

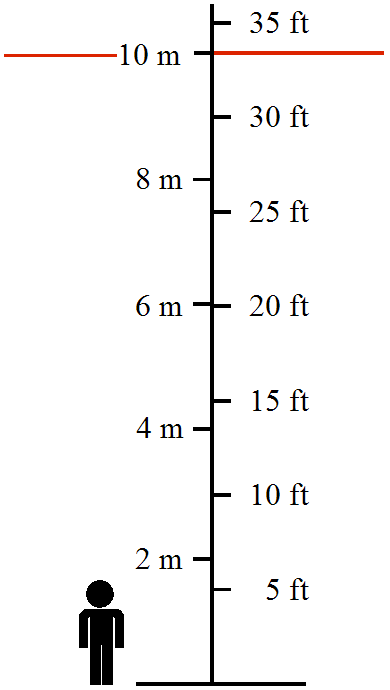
Average height of the waves

Coasts that have a landmass between them and the tsunami's location of origin are usually safe; however, tsunami waves can sometimes diffract around such landmasses. Thus, the Indian state of Kerala was hit by the tsunami despite being on the country's western coast, and the western coast of Sri Lanka suffered substantial impacts. Distance alone was no guarantee of safety, as Somalia was hit harder than Bangladesh despite being much farther away.

Because of the distances involved, the tsunami took anywhere from fifteen minutes to seven hours to reach the coastlines. The northern regions of the Indonesian island of Sumatra were hit quickly, while Sri Lanka and the east coast of India were hit roughly 90 minutes to two hours later. Thailand was struck about two hours later despite being closer to the epicentre because the tsunami travelled more slowly in the shallow Andaman Sea off its western coast.

The tsunami was noticed as far as Struisbaai in South Africa, about 8,500 km (5,300 mi) away, where a 1.5-metre-high (5 ft) tide surged on shore about 16 hours after the earthquake. It took a relatively long time to reach Struisbaai at the southernmost point of Africa, probably because of the broad continental shelf off South Africa and because the tsunami would have followed the South African coast from east to west. The tsunami also reached Antarctica, where tidal gauges at Japan's Showa Base recorded oscillations of up to a metre (3 ft 3 in), with disturbances lasting a couple of days.

Some of the tsunami's energy escaped into the Pacific Ocean, where it produced small but measurable tsunamis along the western coasts of North and South America, typically around 200 to 400 mm (7.9 to 15.7 in). At Manzanillo, Mexico, a tsunami with a wave height of 89.3 centimetres (2.93 ft; 35.2 in) was measured. As well, the tsunami was large enough to be detected in Vancouver, Canada, which puzzled many scientists, as the tsunamis measured in some parts of South America were larger than those measured in some parts of the Indian Ocean. It has been theorized that the tsunamis were focused and directed at long ranges by the mid-ocean ridges which run along the margins of the continental plates.

=== Early signs and warnings ===
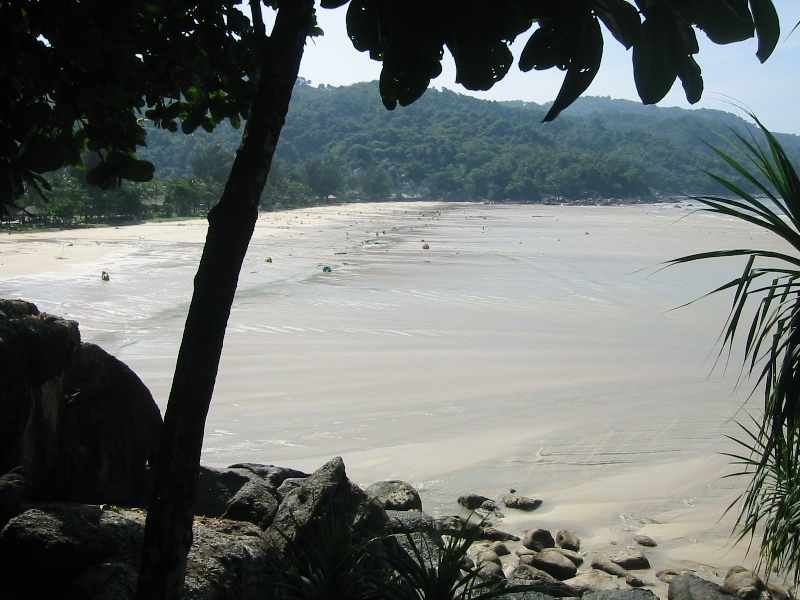
Maximum recession of tsunami waters at Kata Noi Beach at 10:25 a.m., prior to the third—and strongest—tsunami wave

Despite a delay of up to several hours between the earthquake and the impact of the tsunami, nearly all of the victims were taken by surprise. There were no tsunami warning systems in the Indian Ocean to detect tsunamis or to warn the general population living around the ocean. Tsunami detection is difficult because while a tsunami is in deep water, it has little height and a network of sensors is needed to detect it.

Tsunamis are more frequent in the Pacific Ocean than in other oceans because of earthquakes in the "Ring of Fire". Although the extreme western edge of the Ring of Fire extends into the Indian Ocean (the point where the earthquake struck), no warning system existed in that ocean. Tsunamis there are relatively rare despite earthquakes being relatively frequent in Indonesia. The last major tsunami was caused by the 1883 eruption of Krakatoa. Not every earthquake produces large tsunamis: on 28 March 2005, a magnitude 8.7 earthquake hit roughly the same area of the Indian Ocean but did not result in a major tsunami.

The first warning sign of a possible tsunami is the earthquake itself. However, tsunamis can strike thousands of kilometres away where the earthquake is felt only weakly or not at all. In the minutes preceding a tsunami strike, the sea sometimes recedes temporarily from the coast, which was observed on the eastern earthquake rupture zone such as the coastlines of Aceh, Phuket island and Khao Lak in Thailand, Penang island in Malaysia, and the Andaman and Nicobar islands. This rare sight reportedly induced people, especially children, to visit the coast to investigate and collect stranded fish on as much as 2.5 km (1.6 mi) of exposed beach, with fatal results. However, not all tsunamis cause this "disappearing sea" effect. In some cases, there are no warning signs at all: the sea will suddenly swell without retreating, surprising many people and giving them little time to flee.

Tsunami wave field in the Bay of Bengal an hour after the earthquake

One of the few coastal areas to evacuate ahead of the tsunami was on the Indonesian island of Simeulue, close to the epicentre. Island folklore recounted an earthquake and tsunami in 1907, and the islanders fled to inland hills after the initial shaking and before the tsunami struck. These tales and oral folklore from previous generations may have helped the survival of the inhabitants. On Maikhao Beach in north Phuket City, Thailand, a 10-year-old British tourist named Tilly Smith had studied tsunamis in geography at school and recognised the warning signs of the receding ocean and frothing bubbles. She and her parents warned others on the beach, which was evacuated safely. John Chroston, a biology teacher from Scotland, also recognised the signs at Kamala Bay north of Phuket, taking a busload of vacationers and locals to safety on higher ground.

Anthropologists had initially expected the aboriginal population of the Andaman Islands to be badly affected by the tsunami and even feared the already depopulated Onge tribe could have been wiped out. Many of the aboriginal tribes evacuated and suffered fewer casualties, however. Oral traditions developed from previous earthquakes helped the aboriginal tribes escape the tsunami. For example, the folklore of the Onges talks of "huge shaking of ground followed by high wall of water". Almost all of the Onge people seemed to have survived the tsunami.

=== Indonesia ===
==== Aceh ====
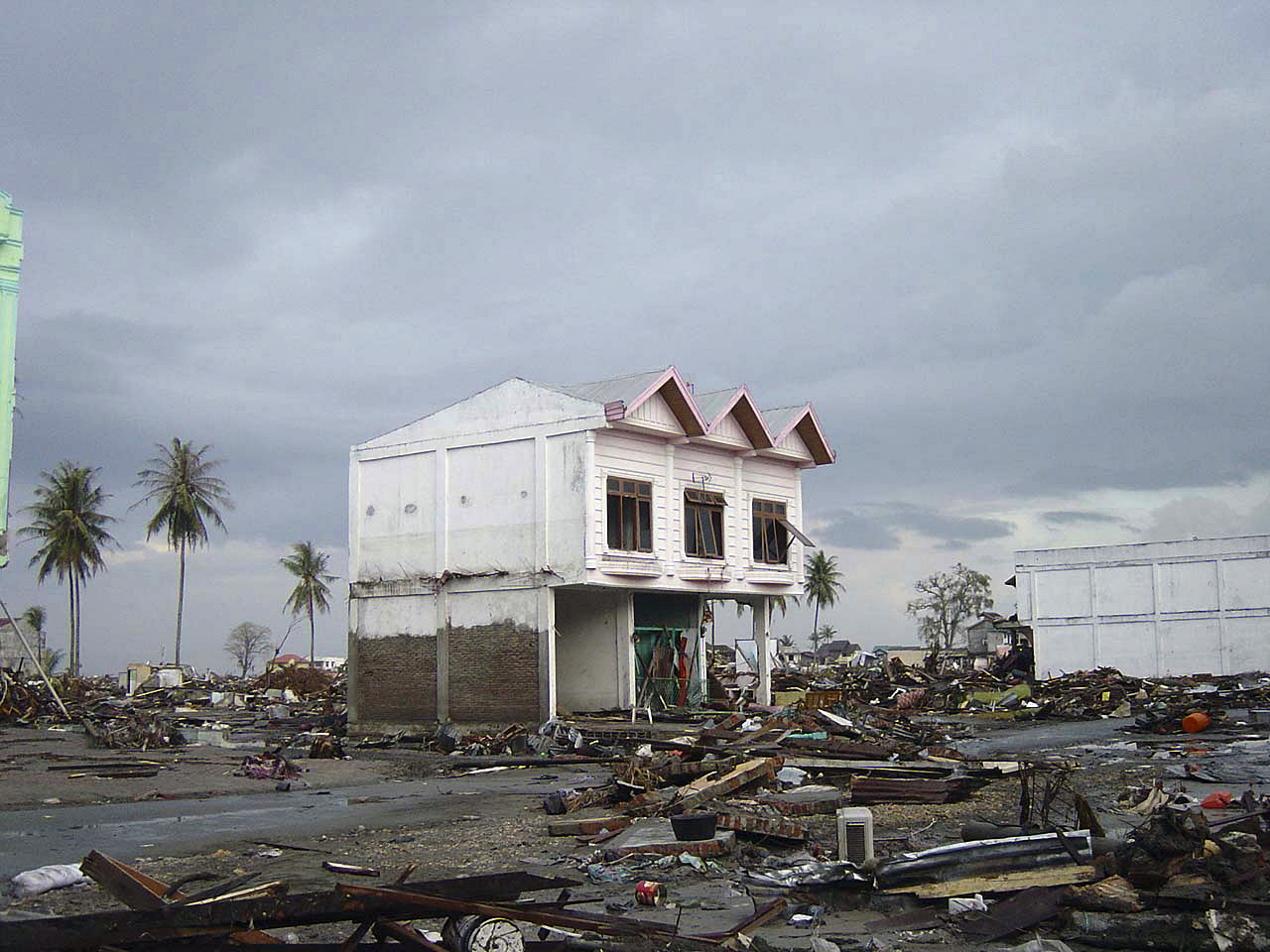
Tsunami inundation height can be seen on a house in Banda Aceh

The tsunami devastated the coastline of Aceh province, about 20 minutes after the earthquake. Banda Aceh, the closest major city, suffered severe casualties. The sea receded and exposed the seabed, prompting locals to collect stranded fish and explore the area. Local eyewitnesses described three large waves, with the first wave rising gently to the foundation of the buildings, followed minutes later by a sudden withdrawal of the sea near the port of Ulèë Lheuë. This was succeeded by the appearance of two large black-coloured steep waves which then travelled inland into the capital city as a large turbulent bore. Eyewitnesses described the tsunami as a "black giant", "mountain" and a "wall of water". Video footage revealed torrents of black water, surging by windows of a two-story residential area situated about 3.2 km (2.0 mi) inland. Additionally, amateur footage recorded in the middle of the city captured an approaching black surge flowing down the city streets, full of debris, inundating them.

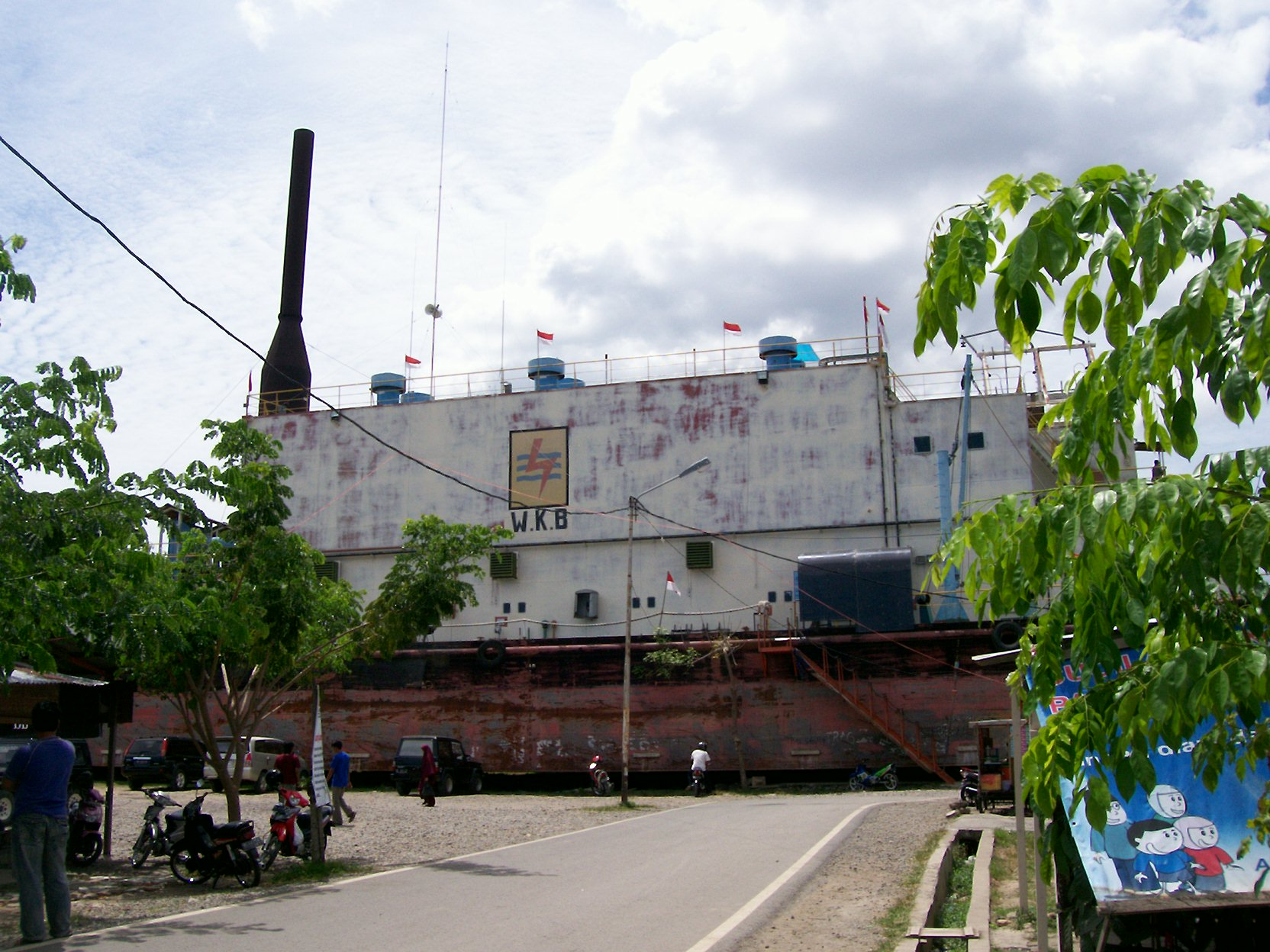
Apung 1, a 2,600-ton vessel, was flung some 2 km (1.2 mi) to 3 km (1.9 mi) inland. In the years following the disaster, it became a local tourist attraction and has remained where it came to rest.

The level of destruction was extreme on the northwestern areas of the city, immediately inland of the aquaculture ponds, and directly facing the Indian Ocean. The tsunami height was reduced from 12 m (39 ft) at Ulèë Lheuë to 6 m (20 ft) a further 8 km (5.0 mi) to the north-east. The inundation was observed to extend 3–4 km (1.9–2.5 mi) inland throughout the city. Within 2–3 km (1.2–1.9 mi) of the shoreline, houses, except for strongly-built reinforced concrete ones with brick walls, which seemed to have been partially damaged by the earthquake before the tsunami attack, were swept away or destroyed by the tsunami. The area toward the sea was wiped clean of nearly every structure, while closer to the river, dense construction in a commercial district showed the effects of severe flooding. The flow depth at the city was just at the level of the second floor, and there were large amounts of debris piled along the streets and in the ground-floor storefronts. In the seaside section of Ulèë Lheuë, the flow depths were over 9 m (30 ft). Footage showed evidence of back-flowing of the Aceh River, carrying debris and people from destroyed villages at the coast and transporting them up to 40 km (25 mi) inland.

A group of small islands: Weh, Breueh, Nasi, Teunom, Bunta, Lumpat, and Batee lie just north of the capital city. The tsunami reached a run-up of 10–20 m (33–66 ft) on the western shorelines of Breueh Island and Nasi Island. Coastal villages were destroyed by the waves. On Weh Island, strong surges were experienced in the port of Sabang, yet there was little damage with reported runup values of 3–5 m (9.8–16.4 ft), most likely due to the island being sheltered from the direct attack by the islands to the south-west.

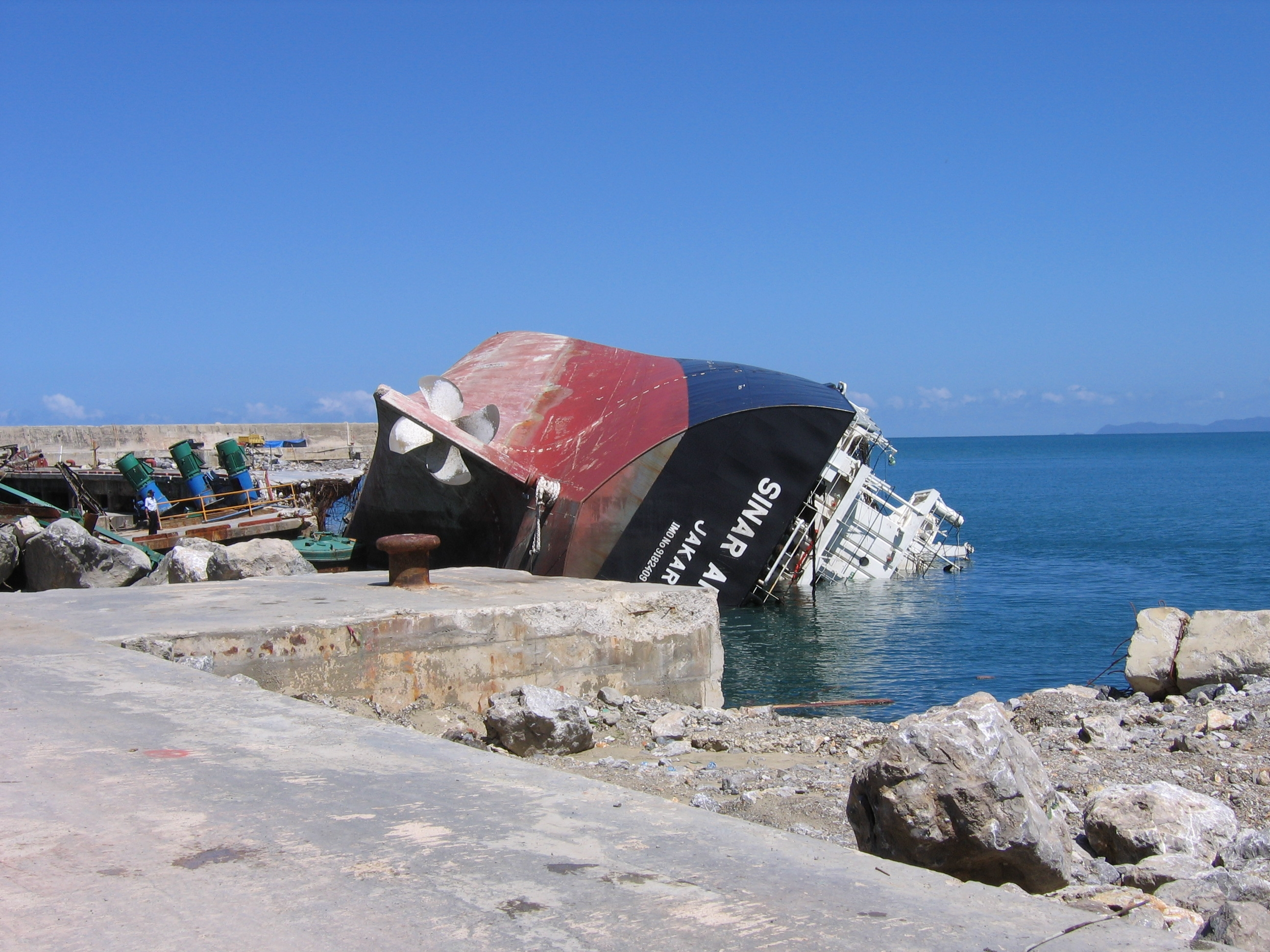
Overturned cement carrier in Lhoknga

Lhoknga is a small coastal community about 13 km (8.1 mi) south-west of Banda Aceh, located on a flat coastal plain in between two rainforest-covered hills, overlooking a large bay and famous for its large swathe of white sandy beach and surfing activities. The locals reported 10 to 12 waves, with the second and third being the highest and most destructive. Interviews with the locals revealed that the sea temporarily receded and exposed coral reefs. In the distant horizon, gigantic black waves about 30 m (98 ft) high made explosion-like sounds as they broke and approached the shore. The first wave came rapidly landward from the south-west as a turbulent bore about 0.5–2.5 m (1.6–8.2 ft) high. The second and third waves were 15–30 m (49–98 ft) high at the coast and appeared like gigantic surfing waves but "taller than the coconut trees and was like a mountain". The second wave was the largest; it came from the west-southwest within five minutes of the first wave. The tsunami stranded cargo ships, barges and destroyed a cement mining facility near the Lampuuk coast, where it reached the fourth level of the building.

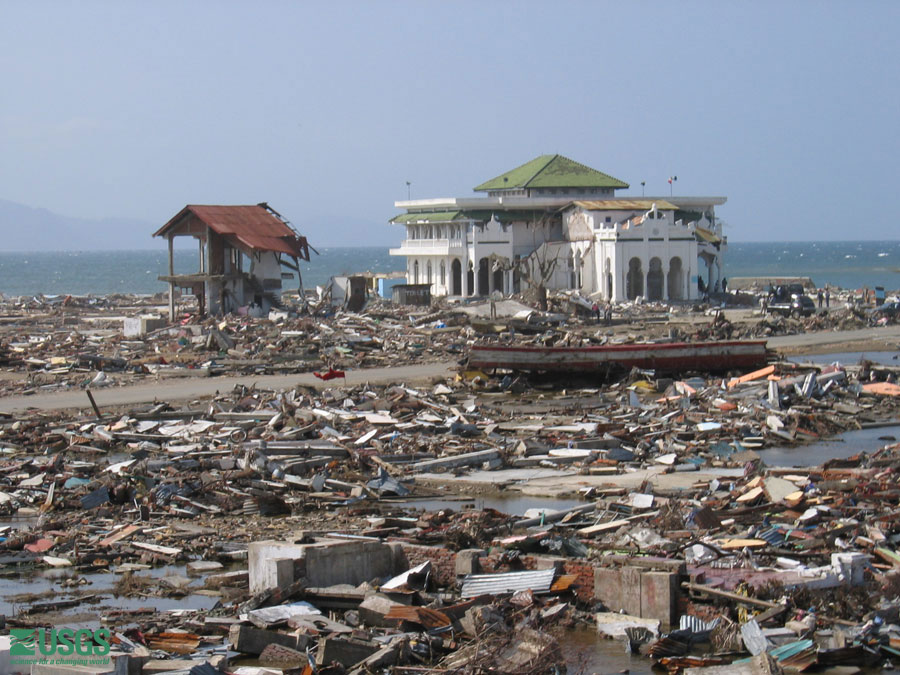
Baiturrahim Mosque survived the tsunami in Ulèë Lheuë, Banda Aceh

Meulaboh, a remote coastal city, was among the hardest hit by the tsunami. The waves arrived after the sea receded about 500 m (1,600 ft), followed by an advancing small tsunami. The second and third destructive waves arrived later, which exceeded the height of the coconut trees. The inundation distance is about 5 km (3.1 mi). Other towns on Aceh's west coast hit by the disaster included Leupung, Lhokruet, Lamno, Patek, Calang, and Teunom. Affected or destroyed towns on the region's north and east coast were Pidie Regency, Samalanga, Panteraja, and Lhokseumawe. The high fatality rate in the area was mainly due to lack of preparation of the community towards a tsunami and limited knowledge and education among the population regarding such a natural phenomenon. Helicopter surveys revealed entire settlements virtually destroyed, with destruction extending miles inland. Only a few mosques remained standing.

The greatest run-up height of the tsunami was measured at a hill between Lhoknga and Leupung, on the western coast of the northern tip of Sumatra, near Banda Aceh, and reached 51 m (167 ft).

The tsunami heights in Sumatra:

- 15–30 m (49–98 ft) on the west coast of Aceh
- 6–12 m (20–39 ft) on the Banda Aceh coast
- 6 m (20 ft) on the Krueng Raya coast
- 5 m (16 ft) on the Sigli coast
- 3–6 m (9.8–19.7 ft) on the north coast of Weh Island directly facing the tsunami source
- 3 m (9.8 ft) on the opposite side of the coast of Weh Island facing the tsunami

=== Sri Lanka ===
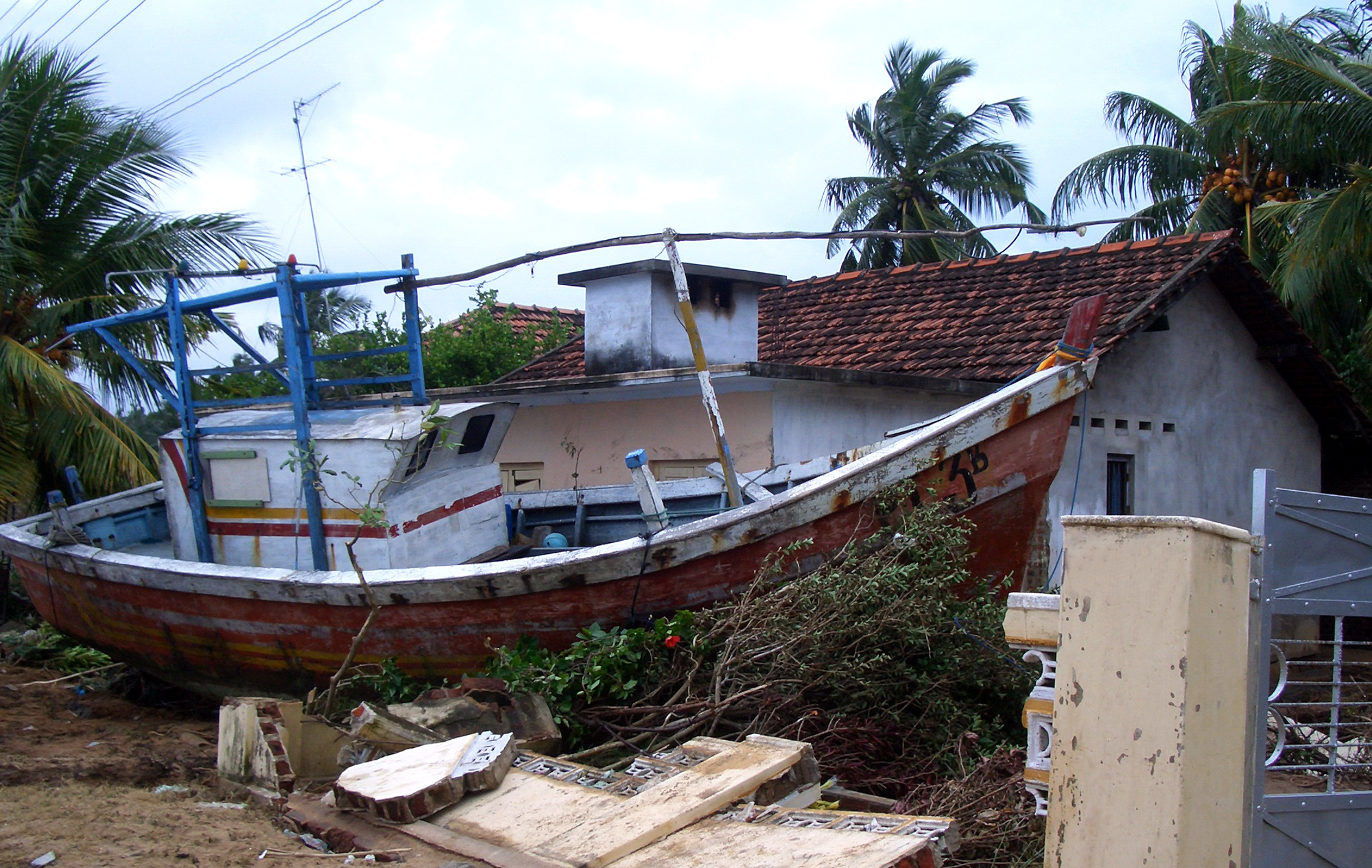
Fishing boat stranded in Batticaloa

The island country of Sri Lanka, located about 1,700 km (1,100 mi) from Sumatra, was ravaged by the tsunami around two hours after the earthquake. The tsunami first struck the eastern coastline and subsequently refracted around the southern point of Sri Lanka (Dondra Head). The refracted tsunami waves then inundated the southwestern part of Sri Lanka after some of its energy was reflected from impact with the Maldives. Civilian casualties here were second only to those in Indonesia, with approximately 35,000 killed. The eastern shores of the country were the hardest hit since it faced the epicentre of the earthquake, while the southwestern shores were hit later, but the death toll was just as severe. The southwestern shores are a hotspot for tourists and fishing. The degradation of the natural environment in Sri Lanka contributed to the high death tolls. Approximately 90,000 buildings and many wooden houses were destroyed.

The tsunami arrived on the island as a small brown-orange-coloured flood. Moments later, the ocean floor was exposed for as much as 1 km (0.62 mi) in places, which was followed by massive second and third waves. Amateur video recorded at the city of Galle showed a large deluge flooding the city, carrying debris and sweeping away people while in the coastal resort town of Beruwala, the tsunami appeared as a huge brown-orange-coloured bore which reached the first level of a hotel, causing destruction and taking people unaware. Other videos recorded showed that the tsunami appeared like a flood raging inland. The construction of seawalls and breakwaters reduced the power of waves at some locations.

The largest run-up measured was at 12.5 m (41 ft) with inundation distance of 390–1,500 m (1,280–4,920 ft) in Yala. In Hambantota, run-ups measured 11 m (36 ft) with the greatest inundation distance of 2 km (1.2 mi). Run-up measurements along the Sri Lankan coasts are at 2.4–4.11 m (7 ft 10 in – 13 ft 6 in). Waves measured on the east coast ranged from 4.5–9 m (15–30 ft) at Pottuvill to Batticaloa at 2.6–5 m (8 ft 6 in – 16 ft 5 in) in the north-east around Trincomalee and 4–5 m (13–16 ft) in the west coast from Moratuwa to Ambalangoda.

Sri Lanka tsunami height survey:

- 9 m (30 ft) at Koggala
- 6 m (20 ft) at Galle port
- 4.8 m (16 ft) around the Galle coast
- 8.7 m (29 ft) at Nonagama
- 4.9 m (16 ft) at Weligama
- 4 m (13 ft) at Dodanduwa
- 4.7 m (15 ft) at Ambalangoda
- 4.7 m (15 ft) at Hikkaduwa Fishery Harbour
- 10 m (33 ft) at Kahawa
- 4.8 m (16 ft) at North Beach of Beruwala
- 6 m (20 ft) at Paiyagala

A regular passenger train operating between Maradana and Matara with over 1,750 passengers was derailed and subsequently overturned by the tsunami, claiming at least 1,000 lives in the largest single rail disaster death toll in history. Estimates based on the state of the shoreline and a high-water mark on a nearby building place the tsunami 7.5–9 m (25–30 ft) above sea level and 2–3 m (6 ft 7 in – 9 ft 10 in) higher than the top of the train.

=== Thailand ===
The tsunami travelled eastward through the Andaman Sea and hit the south-western coasts of Thailand, about 2 hours after the earthquake. Located about 500 km (310 mi) from the epicentre, at the time, the region was popular with tourists because of Christmas. Many of these tourists were caught off-guard by the tsunami, as they had no prior warning. The tsunami hit during high tide. Major locations damaged included the western shores of Phuket island, the resort town of Khao Lak in Phang Nga Province, the coastal provinces of Krabi, Satun, Ranong and Trang and small offshore islands like Ko Racha Yai, the Phi Phi islands, the Surin Islands and the Similan archipelago. Approximately 8,000 people were killed.

Thailand experienced the second largest tsunami run-up. The tsunami heights recorded:

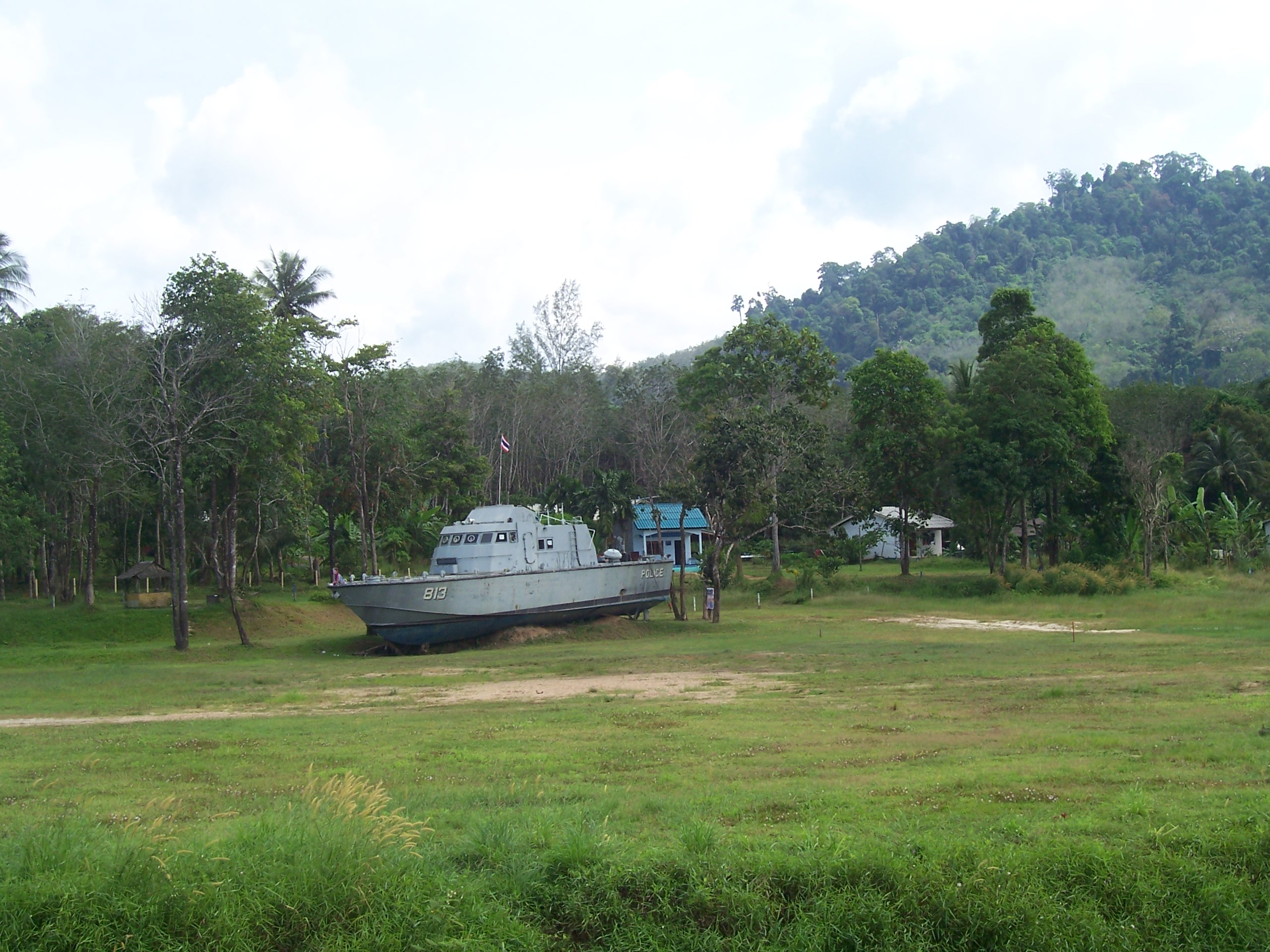
Thai Navy boat stranded almost 2 km (1.2 mi) inland

- 6–10 m (20–33 ft) in Khao Lak
- 3–6 m (9.8–19.7 ft) along the west coast of Phuket island
- 3 m (9.8 ft) along the south coast of Phuket island
- 2 m (6 ft 7 in) along the east coast of Phuket island
- 4–6 m (13–20 ft) on the Phi Phi Islands
- 19.6 m (64 ft) at Ban Thung Dap
- 5 m (16 ft) at Ramson
- 6.8 m (22 ft) at Ban Thale Nok
- 5 m (16 ft) at Hat Praphat (Ranong Coastal Resources Research Station)
- 6.3 m (21 ft) at Thai Mueang District
- 6.8 m (22 ft) at Rai Dan

The province of Phang Nga was the most affected area in Thailand. The quiet resort town of Khao Lak is located on a stretch of golden sandy beach, famed for its hotels overlooking the Andaman Sea and hilly rainforests. A video, taken by a local restaurant manager from a hill adjacent to the beach, showed that the tsunami's arrival was preceded by a sudden retreat of the sea exposing the seafloor. Many tourists and locals can be seen trying to gather fish. Moments later, the tsunami arrives as a wall of foaming water that slams into the coast, washing away numerous people who had no time to escape. Another amateur video, captured by a German family at beach level, showed the tsunami appearing as a white horizontal line in the distant horizon, gradually becoming bigger (bore-like), engulfing a jet skier and lifting two police boats. A maximum inundation of approximately 2 km (1.2 mi) was measured, the inundated depths were 4–7 m (13–23 ft) and there was evidence that the tsunami reached the third floor of a resort hotel. The tsunami in Khao Lak was bigger due to offshore coral reefs and shallow seafloor which caused the tsunami to pile-up. This was similar to eyewitness accounts of the tsunami at Banda Aceh.

Khao Lak also experienced the largest tsunami run-up height outside of Sumatra. The highest-recorded tsunami run-up was measured 19.6 m (64 ft) at Ban Thung Dap, on the south-west tip of Ko Phra Thong Island and the second-highest at 15.8 m (52 ft) at Ban Nam Kim. Moreover, the largest death toll occurred at Khao Lak, with about 5,000 people killed.

In addition, the tsunami inflicted damage to the popular resort town of Ao Nang in Krabi Province. Video footage showed that the tsunami appeared as multiple white surfs which violently lifted up yachts and boats, eventually crashing onto beaches. Footage captured at Koh Lanta showed a wall of water swamping the beach, while another video taken at another location showed a large surfing wave-like tsunami approaching the shore, lifting up a yacht and flooding the beach. At Koh Sriboya, the tsunami advanced inland as a turbulent medium bore, while at Koh Phayam, Ranong Province, the tsunami appeared as a wall of water.

At Phuket Province, the island province's western beaches were struck by the tsunami. At Patong Beach, a popular tourist destination, the tsunami first arrived as a small flood, which swept away cars and surprised people. About 10 minutes later, the sea receded for a while before the tsunami arrived again as a large wall of water looming over the skyline and flooding the coast. Another video from Kamala Beach showed the tsunami flooding the ground floor of a restaurant sweeping away an elderly couple. On Karon Beach, Kamala Beach and Kata Beach, the tsunami came in like a surging flood inland carrying people and cars. On some locations, a coastal road, which was built higher than the shore, protected a hotel which was behind it. On the east coast of Phuket Island, the tsunami height was about 2 m. In one river mouth, many boats were damaged. The tsunami moved counter-clockwise around Phuket Island, as was the case at Okushiri Island in the 1993 Hokkaido earthquake. According to interviews, the second wave was the largest. The tsunami heights were 5–6 m (16–20 ft) and the inundated depth was about 2 m (6.6 ft). The tsunami surprised many tourists at Koh Racha Yai, where it flooded the resorts. About 250 people perished directly in the tsunami.

The Phi Phi Islands are a group of small islands that were affected by the tsunami. The north bay of Phi Phi Don Island opens to the north-west in the direction of the tsunami. The measured tsunami height on this beach was 5.8 m (19 ft). According to eyewitness accounts, the tsunami came from the north and south. The ground level was about 2 m above sea level, where there were many cottages and hotels. The south bay opens to the south-east and faces in the opposite direction from the tsunami. Furthermore, Phi Phi Le Island shields the port of Phi Phi Don Island. The measured tsunami height was 4.6 m (15 ft) in the port. Amateur camcorder footage taken by Israeli tourists showed the tsunami advancing inland suddenly as a small flood, gradually becoming more powerful and engulfing the whole beach and resort, with the tsunami carrying a yacht out to sea.

Moreover, the tsunami was detected by scuba divers around offshore islands like the Similan Islands and the Surin Islands. The divers reported being caught in a violent, swirling current suddenly while underwater. Local camcorder footage showed the tsunami surging inland and flooding camping equipment at the Similan Islands while the tsunami caught tourists unaware at the Surin Islands, and dragging them out towards the sea.

=== India ===
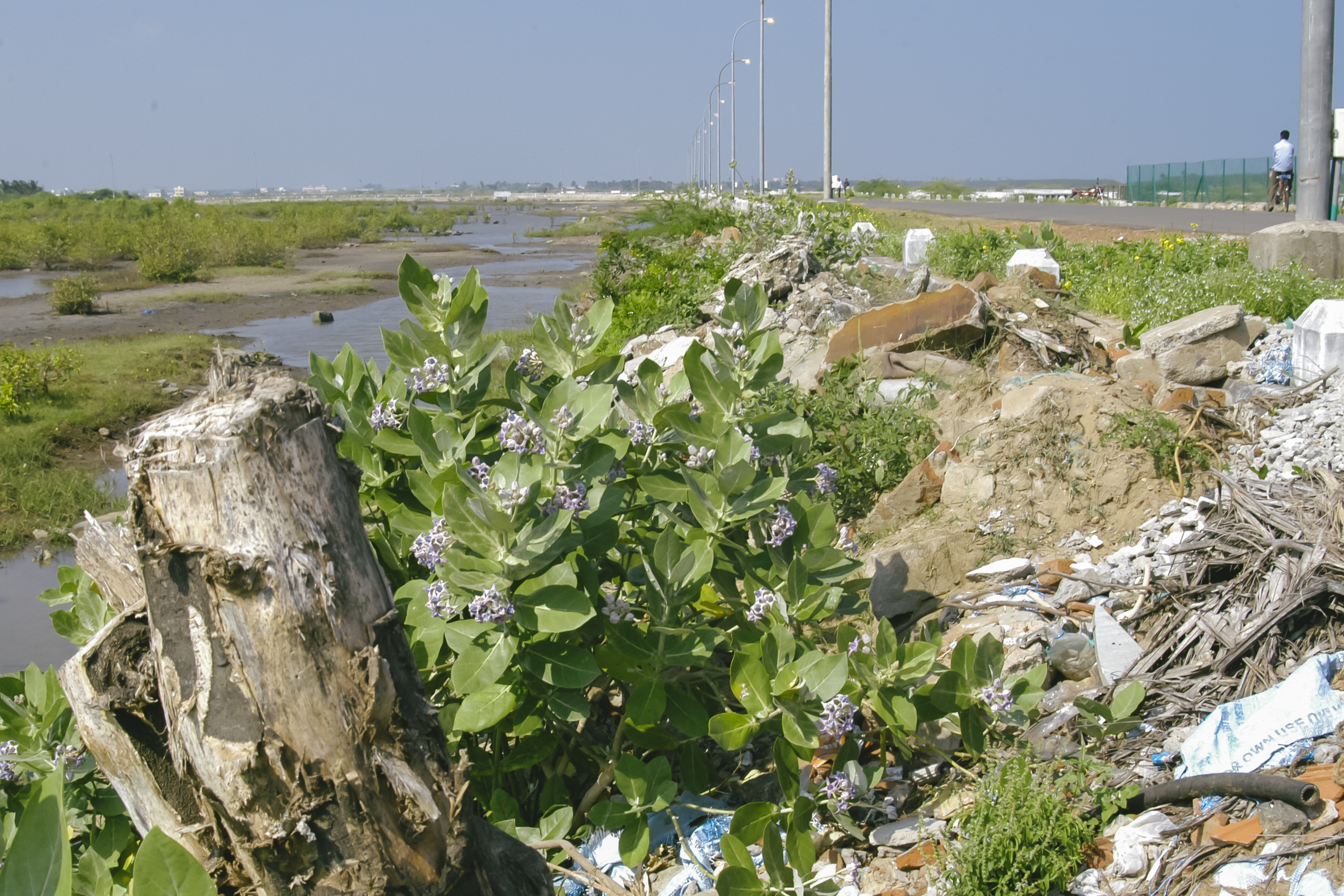
Tree stumps and debris remain on Karaikal beach several years after the 2004 tsunami

The tsunami reached the states of Andhra Pradesh and Tamil Nadu along the southeastern coastline of the Indian mainland about two hours after the earthquake. At the same time, it arrived in the state of Kerala, on the southwestern coast. There were two to five tsunamis that coincided with the local high tide in some areas.

The tsunami runup height measured in mainland India by Ministry of Home Affairs includes:

- 3.4 m (11 ft) at Kerala, inundation distance of 0.5–1.5 km (0.31–0.93 mi) with 250 km (160 mi) of coastline affected
- 4.5 m (15 ft) at the southern coastline of Tamil Nadu, inundation distance of 0.2–2 km (0.12–1.24 mi) with 100 km (62 mi) of coastline affected
- 5 m (16 ft) at the eastern coastline of Tamil Nadu facing tsunami source, inundation distance of 0.4–1.5 km (0.25–0.93 mi) with 800 km (500 mi) of coastline affected
- 4 m (13 ft) at Pondicherry, inundation distance of 0.2–2 km (0.12–1.24 mi) with 25 km (16 mi) of coastline affected
- 2.2 m (7.2 ft) at Andhra Pradesh, inundation distance of 0.2–1 km (0.12–0.62 mi) with 985 km (612 mi) of coastline affected

Along the coast of Tamil Nadu, the 13 km (8.1 mi) Marina Beach in Chennai was battered by the tsunami which swept across the beach taking morning walkers unaware. Amateur video recorded at a resort beach showed the tsunami arriving as a large wall of water as it approached the coast and flooding it as it advanced inland. Besides that, a 10 m (33 ft) black muddy tsunami ravaged the city of Karaikal, where 492 people died. The city of Pondicherry, protected by seawalls was relatively unscathed. Local video recorded that before the arrival of the tsunami, people had swarmed the beach to investigate fish that had been stranded on the sand. Furthermore, at the coastal town of Kanyakumari, the seabed was exposed briefly before a large wall of water can be seen on the horizon and subsequently flooding the town. Other footage showed the tsunami dramatically crashed into the Vivekananda Rock Memorial. The worst affected area in Tamil Nadu was Nagapattinam district, with 6,051 fatalities caused by a 5 m (16 ft) tsunami, followed by Cuddalore district, with many villages destroyed. Most of the people killed were members of the fishing community. Velankanni, a coastal town with a Catholic Basilica and a popular pilgrimage destination was also one of the worst hit by the tsunami that struck at around 9.30 am on that Sunday, when pilgrims who were mostly from Kerala among others were inside the church attending the Malayalam Mass. The rising sea water did not enter the shrine, but the receding waters swept away hundreds of pilgrims who were on the beach. The shrine's compound, nearby villages, hundreds of shops, homes and pilgrims were washed away into the sea. About 600 pilgrims died. Rescue teams extricated more than 400 bodies from the sand and rocks in the vicinity and large number of unidentified bodies were buried in mass graves.

Kerala experienced tsunami-related damage in three southern densely populated districts, Ernakulam, Alappuzha, and Kollam, due to diffraction of the waves around Sri Lanka. Conversely, the southernmost district of Thiruvananthapuram experienced negligible impact, a result of the wide-angle turn required for diffracted waves to reach the peninsular tip. The most severe destruction was concentrated along narrow land strips situated between the Arabian Sea to the west and the Kerala backwaters to the east, where the geography restricted inland evacuation. Initial tidal recession preceded the surge, with the highest fatality rate recorded in the Alappad panchayat—including the villages of Cheriazheekkal and Azheekal—where waves reached heights of 4 m (13 ft) and caused approximately 131 deaths.

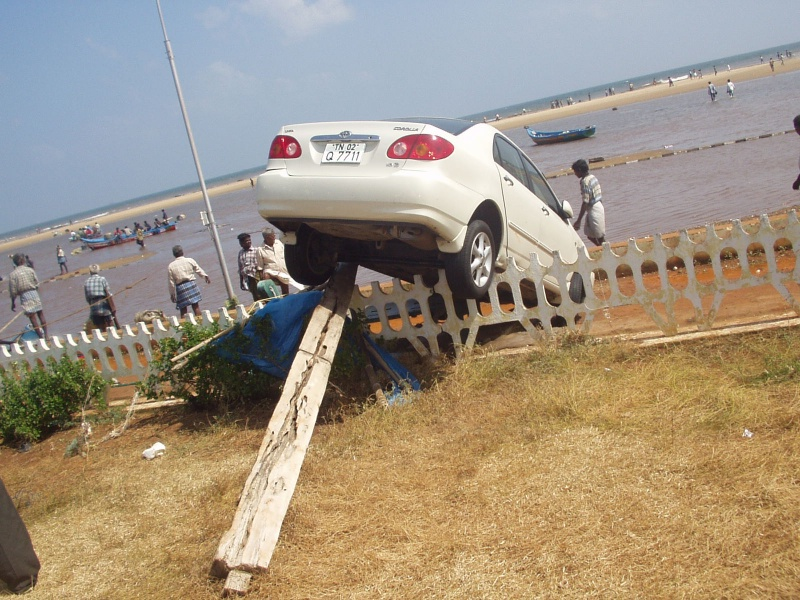
A Toyota Corolla deposited on top of a fence and various pieces of debris in Chennai

Many villages in Andhra Pradesh were destroyed. In the Krishna District, the tsunami created havoc in Manginapudi and on Machalipattanam Beach. The most affected was Prakasam District, recording 35 deaths, with maximum damage at Singarayakonda. Given the enormous power of the tsunami, the fishing industry suffered the greatest. Moreover, the cost of damage in the transport sector was reported in the tens of thousands.

The tsunami run-up was only 1.6 m (5.2 ft) in areas of Tamil Nadu shielded by the island of Sri Lanka but was 4–5 m (13–16 ft) in coastal districts such as Nagapattinam in Tamil Nadu directly across from Sumatra. On the western coast, the runup elevations were 4.5 m (15 ft) at Kanyakumari District in Tamil Nadu and 3.4 m (11 ft) each at Kollam and Ernakulam districts in Kerala. The time between the waves ranged from about 15 minutes to 90 minutes. The tsunami varied in height from 2 m (6.6 ft) to 10 m (33 ft) based on survivors' accounts. The tsunami travelled 2.5 km (1.6 mi) at its maximum inland at Karaikal, Puducherry. The inundation distance varied between 1,006–500 m (3,301–1,640 ft) in most areas, except at river mouths, where it was more than 1 km (0.62 mi). Areas with dense coconut groves or mangroves had much smaller inundation distances, and those with river mouths or backwaters saw larger inundation distances. Presence of seawalls at the Kerala and Tamil Nadu coasts reduced the impact of the waves. However, when the seawalls were made of loose stones, the stones were displaced and carried a few metres inland.

==== Andaman and Nicobar Islands ====
Due to close proximity to the earthquake, the tsunami took just minutes to devastate the Andaman and Nicobar Islands. The Andaman Islands were moderately affected while the island of Little Andaman and the Nicobar Islands were severely affected by the tsunami.

In South Andaman Island, based on local eyewitnesses, there were three tsunami waves, with the third being the most destructive. Flooding occurred at the coast and low-lying areas inland, which were connected to open sea through creeks. Inundation was observed, along the east coast of South Andaman Island, restricted to Chidiyatapu, Burmanallah, Kodiaghat, Beadnabad, Corbyn's Cove and Marina Park/Aberdeen Jetty areas. Several near-shore establishments and numerous infrastructures such as seawalls and a 20 MW diesel-generated power plant at Bamboo Flat were destroyed. At Port Blair, the water receded before the first wave, and the third wave was the tallest and caused the most damage.

Results of the tsunami survey in South Andaman along Chiriyatapu, Corbyn's Cove and Wandoor beaches:

- 5 m (16 ft) in maximum tsunami height with a run-up of 4.24 m (13.9 ft) at Chiriyatapu Beach
- 5.5 m (18 ft) in maximum tsunami height and run-up at Corbyn's Cove Beach
- 6.6 m (22 ft) in maximum tsunami height and run-up of 4.63 m (15.2 ft) at Wandoor Beach

Meanwhile, in the Little Andaman, tsunami waves impinged on the eastern shore about 25 to 30 minutes after the earthquake in a four-wave cycle of which the fourth tsunami was the most devastating with a wave height of about 10 m (33 ft). The tsunami destroyed settlements at Hut Bay within a range of 1 km (0.62 mi) from the seashore. Run up level up to 3.8 m (12 ft) have been measured.

In Malacca, located on the island of Car Nicobar, there were three tsunami waves. The sea was observed to rise suddenly before the onset of the first wave. The first wave came 5 minutes after the earthquake, preceded by a recession of the sea up to 600–700 m (2,000–2,300 ft).. The second and third waves came in 10-minute intervals after the first wave. The third wave was the strongest, with a maximum tsunami wave height of 11 m (36 ft). Waves nearly three stories high devastated the Indian Air Force base, located just south of Malacca. The maximum tsunami wave height of 11 m (36 ft). Inundation limit was found to be up to 1.25 km (0.78 mi) inland. The impact of the waves was so severe that four oil tankers were thrown almost 800 m (2,600 ft) from the seashore near Malacca to the Air force colony main gate. In Chuckchucha and Lapati, the tsunami arrived in a three-wave cycle with a maximum tsunami wave height of 12 m (39 ft).

In Campbell Bay of Great Nicobar Island, the tsunami waves hit the area three times with an inundation limit of 250–500 m (820–1,640 ft). A rise in sea level was observed before the first wave came within 5 minutes of the earthquake. The second and third waves came in 10-minute intervals after the first. The second wave was the strongest. The tsunami waves wreaked havoc in the densely populated Jogindar Nagar area, situated 13 km (8.1 mi) south of Campbell Bay. According to local accounts, tsunami waves attacked the area three times. The first wave came five minutes after the mainshock (0629 hrs.) with a marginal drop in sea level. The second wave came 10 minutes after the first one with a maximum height of 4.8 m (16 ft) to 8 m (26 ft) and caused the major destruction. The third wave came within 15 minutes after the second with lower wave height. The maximum inundation limit due to tsunami water was about 500 m (1,600 ft).

The worst affected island in the Andaman and Nicobar chain is Katchal Island, with 303 people confirmed dead and 4,354 missing out of a total population of 5,312. The significant shielding of Port Blair and Campbell Bay by steep mountainous outcrops contributed to the relatively low wave heights at these locations, whereas the open terrain along the eastern coast at Malacca and Hut Bay contributed to the great height of the tsunami waves.

Reports of tsunami wave height:

- 1.5 m (4 ft 11 in) at Diglipur and Rangat at North Andaman Island
- 8 m (26 ft) high at Campbell Bay on Great Nicobar Island
- 10–12 m (33–39 ft) high at Malacca (in Car Nicobar Island) and at Hut Bay on Little Andaman Island
- 3 m (9.8 ft) high at Port Blair on South Andaman Island

=== Maldives ===
The tsunami severely affected the Maldives at a distance of 2,500 km (1,600 mi) from the epicentre. Similar to Sri Lanka, survivors reported three waves with the second wave being the most powerful. Being rich in coral reefs, the Maldives provides an opportunity for scientists to assess the impact of a tsunami on coral atolls. The significantly lower tsunami impact on the Maldives compared to Sri Lanka is mostly due to the topography and bathymetry of the atoll chain with offshore coral reefs, deep channels separating individual atolls and its arrival within low tide which decreased the power of the tsunami. After the tsunami, there was some concern that the country might be submerged entirely and become uninhabitable. However, this was proven untrue.

The highest tsunami wave measured was 4 m (13 ft) at Vilufushi Island. The tsunami arrived approximately two hours after the earthquake. The greatest tsunami inundation occurred at North Male Atoll, Male Island at 250 m (820 ft) along the streets.

Local footage recorded showed the tsunami flooding the streets up to knee level in town, while another video taken at the beach showed the tsunami slowly flooding and gradually surging inland.

The Maldives tsunami wave analysis:

- 1.3–2.4 m (4 ft 3 in – 7 ft 10 in) at North Male Atoll, Male Island
- 2 m (6 ft 7 in) at North Male Atoll, Huhule Island
- 1.7–2.8 m (5 ft 7 in – 9 ft 2 in) at South Male Atoll, Embudhu Finothu
- 2.5–3.3 m (8 ft 2 in – 10 ft 10 in) at Laamu Atoll, Fonadhoo Island
- 2.2–2.9 m (7 ft 3 in – 9 ft 6 in) at Laamu Atoll, Gan Island
- 2.3–3 m (7 ft 7 in – 9 ft 10 in) at North Male Atoll, Dhiffushi Island
- 2.2–2.4 m (7 ft 3 in – 7 ft 10 in) at North Male Atoll, Huraa Island
- more than 1.5 m (4 ft 11 in) at North Male Atoll, Kuda Huraa Island

=== Myanmar ===
In Myanmar, the tsunami caused only moderate damage, which arrived between 2 and 5.5 hours after the earthquake. Although the country's western Andaman Sea coastline lies at the proximity of the rupture zone, there were smaller tsunamis than the neighbouring Thai coast, because the main tsunami source did not extend to the Andaman Islands. Another factor is that some coasts of Taninthayi Division were protected by the Myeik Archipelago. Based on scientific surveys from the Irrawaddy Delta through Taninthayi Division, it was revealed that tsunami heights along the Myanmar coast were between 0.4–2.9 m (1 ft 4 in – 9 ft 6 in). Eyewitnesses compared the tsunami with the "rainy-season high tide"; although at most locations, the tsunami height was similar or smaller than the "rainy-season high tide" level.

Tsunami survey heights:

- 0.6–2.3 m (2 ft 0 in – 7 ft 7 in) around the Irrawaddy delta
- 0.9–2.9 m (2 ft 11 in – 9 ft 6 in) at Dawei area
- 0.7–2.2 m (2 ft 4 in – 7 ft 3 in) around Myeik
- 0.4–2.6 m (1 ft 4 in – 8 ft 6 in) around Kawthaung

Interviews with residents indicate that they did not feel the earthquake in Taninthayi Division or the Irrawaddy Delta. The 71 casualties can be attributed to poor housing infrastructure and additionally, the fact that the coastal residents in the surveyed areas live on flat land along the coast, especially in the Irrawaddy Delta, and that there is no higher ground to which to evacuate. The tsunami heights from the earthquake were not more than 3 m (9.8 ft) along the Myanmar coast, the amplitudes were slightly large off the Irrawaddy Delta, probably because the shallow delta caused a concentration in tsunami energy.

=== Somalia ===
The tsunami travelled 5,000 km (3,100 mi) west across the open ocean before striking the East African country of Somalia. Around 289 fatalities were reported in the Horn of Africa, drowned by four tsunami waves. The hardest-hit was a 650 km (400 mi) stretch of coastline between Garacad (Mudug region) and Hafun (Bari region), which forms part of Puntland province. Most of the victims were reported along the low-lying Xaafuun Peninsula. The Puntland coast in northern Somalia was by far the area hardest hit by the waves to the west of the Indian subcontinent. The waves arrived around noon local time.

Consequently, tsunami runup heights vary from 5 m (16 ft) to 9 m (30 ft) with inundation distances varying from 44 m (144 ft) to 704 m (2,310 ft). The maximum runup height of almost 9 m (30 ft) was recorded in Bandarbeyla. An even higher runup point was measured on a cliff near the town of Eyl, solely on an eyewitness account.

The highest death toll was in Hafun, with 19 dead and 160 people presumed missing out of its 5,000 inhabitants. This was the highest number of casualties in a single African town and the largest tsunami death toll in a single town to the west of the Indian subcontinent. Small drawbacks were observed before the third and most powerful tsunami wave flooded the town.

=== Other locations ===
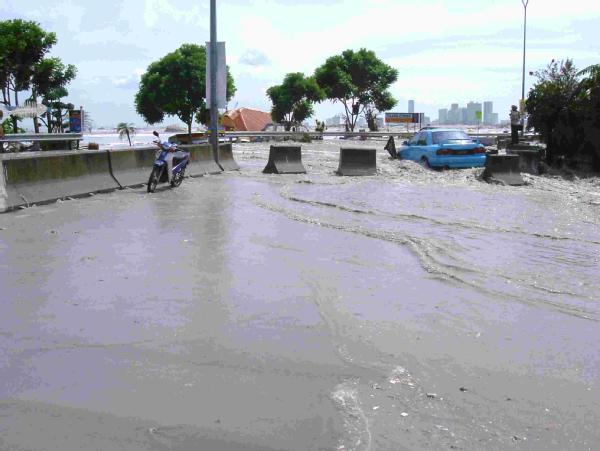
Flooding in George Town, Malaysia

The tsunami also reached Malaysia, mainly on the northern states such as Kedah, Perak and Penang and on offshore islands such as Langkawi island. Peninsular Malaysia was shielded by the full force of the tsunami due to the protection offered by the island of Sumatra, which lies just off the western coast.

Bangladesh escaped major damage and deaths because the water displaced by the strike-slip fault was relatively little on the northern section of the rupture zone, which ruptured slowly. In Yemen, the tsunami killed two people with a maximum runup of 2 m (6.6 ft).

The tsunami was detected in the southern parts of east Africa, where rough seas were reported, specifically on the eastern and southern coasts that face the Indian Ocean. A few other African countries also recorded fatalities; one in Kenya, three in Seychelles, ten in Tanzania, and South Africa, where two were killed as a direct result of the tsunami—the furthest from the epicentre.

Tidal surges also occurred along the Western Australian coast that lasted for several hours, resulting in boats losing their moorings and two people needing to be rescued.

== Impact ==
=== Countries affected ===
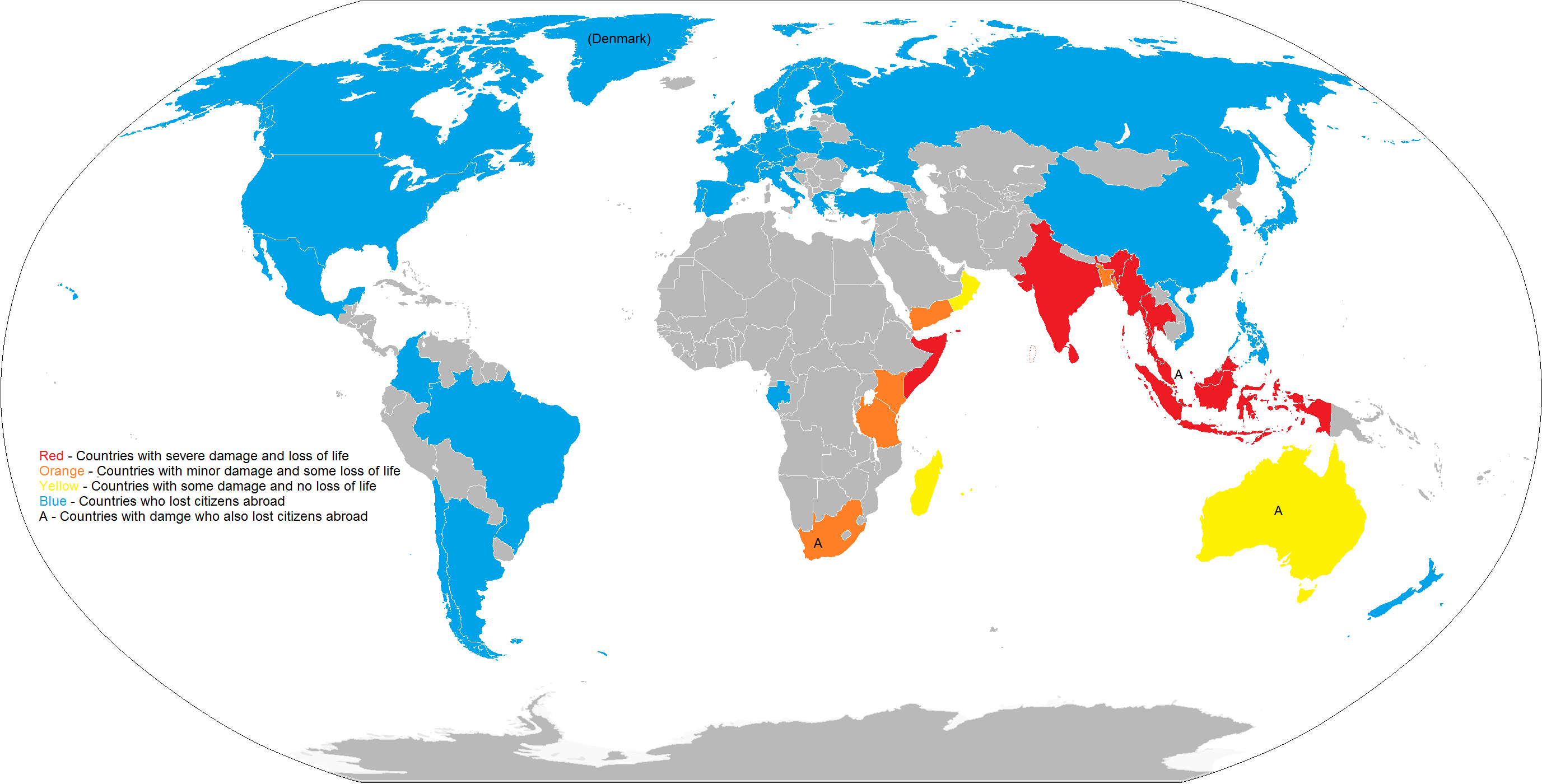
severe damage and loss of life moderate damage and some loss of life minor damage and no loss of life loss of citizens abroad A received damages and loss of citizens abroad

According to the final report of the Tsunami Evaluation Coalition, a total of 227,898 people died. Another common total, as given by the UN Office of the Special Envoy for Tsunami Recovery, is 229,866 dead. Measured in lives lost, this is one of the ten worst earthquakes in recorded history, as well as the single worst tsunami in history. Indonesia was the worst affected area, with most death toll estimates at around 170,000. The death toll for Indonesia alone may be as high as 172,761 lives. An initial report by Siti Fadilah Supari, the Indonesian Minister of Health at the time, estimated the death total to be as high as 220,000 in Indonesia, giving a total of 280,000 fatalities. However, the estimated number of dead and missing in Indonesia were later reduced by over 50,000. In their report, the Tsunami Evaluation Coalition stated, "It should be remembered that all such data are subject to error, as data on missing persons especially are not always as good as one might wish". A much higher number of deaths has been suggested for Myanmar based on reports from Thailand.

The tsunami caused severe damage and deaths as far as the east coast of Africa, with the furthest recorded fatality directly attributed to the tsunami at Rooi-Els, close to Cape Town, 8,000 km (5,000 mi) from the epicentre.

Relief agencies reported that one third of the dead appeared to be children. This was a result of the high proportion of children in the populations of many of the affected regions and because children were the least able to resist being overcome by the surging waters. Oxfam went on to report that as many as four times more women than men were killed in some regions because they were waiting on the beach for the fishers to return and looking after their children in the houses.

States of emergency were declared in Sri Lanka, Indonesia, and the Maldives. The United Nations estimated at the outset that the relief operation would be the costliest in human history. Then-UN Secretary-General Kofi Annan stated that reconstruction would probably take between five and ten years. Governments and non-governmental organizations feared that the final death toll might double as a result of diseases, prompting a massive humanitarian response.

In addition to a large number of local residents, up to 9,000 foreign tourists (mostly Europeans) enjoying the peak holiday travel season were among the dead or missing, especially people from the Nordic countries. Sweden was the European country most severely affected both in absolute numbers, and by a wide margin when considered in relation to the country's population, with a death toll of 543. France was close behind with a death toll of 542 followed by Germany with 539 identified victims.

Affected country^{[a]}	Confirmed deaths	Estimated deaths^{[b]}	Injured	Missing	Displaced	Ref
Indonesia	130,736	167,540		37,063	500,000+	
Sri Lanka	35,322^{[c]}	35,322	21,411		516,150	
India	12,405	16,269		3,874	647,599	
Thailand	5,395^{[d]}	8,212	8,457	2,817	7,000	
Somalia	78	289			5,000	
Myanmar	61	400–600	45	200	3,200	
Maldives	82	108		26	15,000+	
Malaysia	68	75	299	6	5,000+	
Tanzania	10	13		3		
Seychelles	3	3	57		200	
Bangladesh	2	2				
South Africa	2^{[e]}	2				
Yemen	2	2				
Kenya	1	1	2			
Madagascar					1,000+	
Total estimates	184,167	227,898	125,000	43,789	1,740,000	
^a This table refers only to countries directly affected by the tsunami, not to countries whose citizens were affected while overseas.; ^b Includes those reported under 'Confirmed'. If no separate estimates are available, the number in this column is the same as reported under 'Confirmed'.; ^c Does not include approximately 19,000 missing people initially declared by Tamil Tiger authorities from regions under their control.; ^d Data includes at least 2,464 foreigners.; ^e Does not include South African citizens who died outside of South Africa (e.g., tourists in Thailand).

=== Environmental impact ===
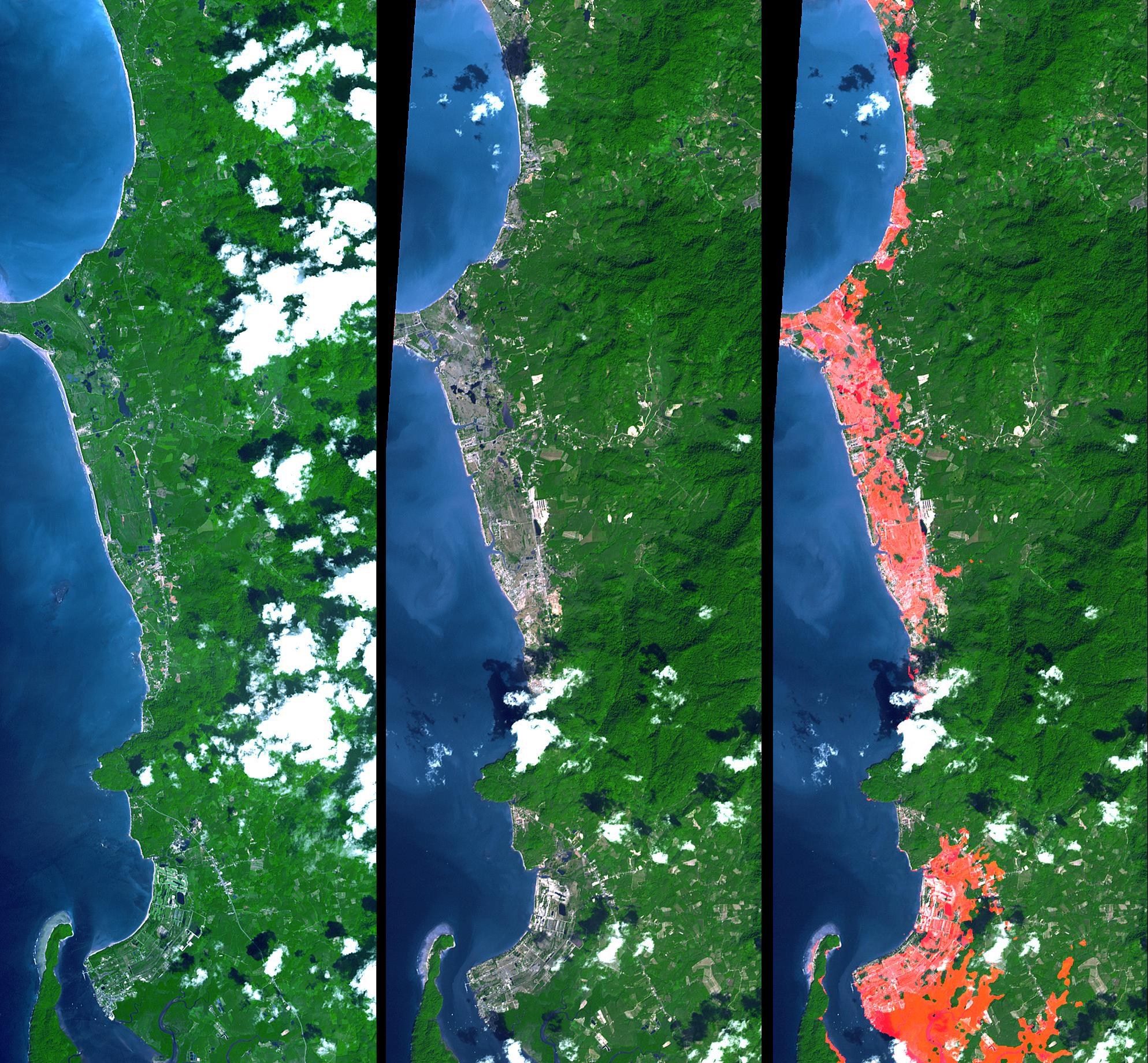
Tsunami inundation in Khao Lak, Thailand

Beyond the heavy toll on human lives, the Indian Ocean earthquake caused an enormous environmental impact that affected the region for many years. Severe damage was inflicted on ecosystems such as mangroves, coral reefs, forests, coastal wetlands, vegetation, sand dunes and rock formations, animal and plant biodiversity and groundwater. Also, the spread of solid and liquid waste and industrial chemicals, water pollution and the destruction of sewage collectors and treatment plants threatened the environment even further. The environmental impact took a long time and significant resources to assess.

The main effect was caused by poisoning of the freshwater supplies and of the soil by saltwater infiltration and a deposit of a salt layer over arable land. In the Maldives, 16 to 17 coral reef atolls that were overcome by sea waves are without fresh water and could be rendered uninhabitable for decades. Uncountable wells that served communities were invaded by sea, sand, and earth, and aquifers were invaded through porous rock. On the island's east coast, the tsunami contaminated wells on which many villagers relied for drinking water.

The Colombo-based International Water Management Institute monitored the effects of saltwater and concluded that the wells recovered to pre-tsunami drinking water quality one-and-a-half years after the event. The IWMI developed protocols for cleaning wells contaminated by saltwater; these were subsequently officially endorsed by the World Health Organization as part of its series of Emergency Guidelines.

Salted-over soil becomes infertile, and it is difficult and costly to restore for agriculture. It also causes the death of plants and important soil micro-organisms. Thousands of rice, mango, and banana plantations in Sri Lanka were destroyed almost entirely and will take years to recover.

In addition to other forms of aid, the Australian government sent ecological experts to help develop strategies for reef-monitoring and rehabilitation of marine environments and coral reefs in the Maldives, Seychelles and other areas. Scientists had developed significant ecological expertise from work with the Great Barrier Reef, in Australia's northeastern waters.

In response to the unprecedented situation, the United Nations Environment Programme (UNEP) worked with governments in the region to determine the severity of the ecological impact and how to address it. UNEP established an emergency fund, set up a Task Force to respond to requests for assistance from countries affected by the tsunami, and was able to mobilize and distribute approximately US$9.3 million for environmental recovery and disaster risk reduction between 2004 and 2007. Funding came from other international agencies and from countries including Finland, Norway, Spain, Sweden and the United Kingdom.

Evidence suggested that the presence of mangroves in coastal areas had provided some protection, when compared to areas that had been cleared for aquaculture or development. As a result, mangrove restoration become a focus of a number of projects, with varied success. Such approaches to ecosystem-based disaster risk reduction appear to be most successful when local communities are closely involved as stakeholders throughout the process, and when careful attention is paid to the physical conditions of chosen sites to ensure that mangroves can thrive there.

=== Economic impact ===
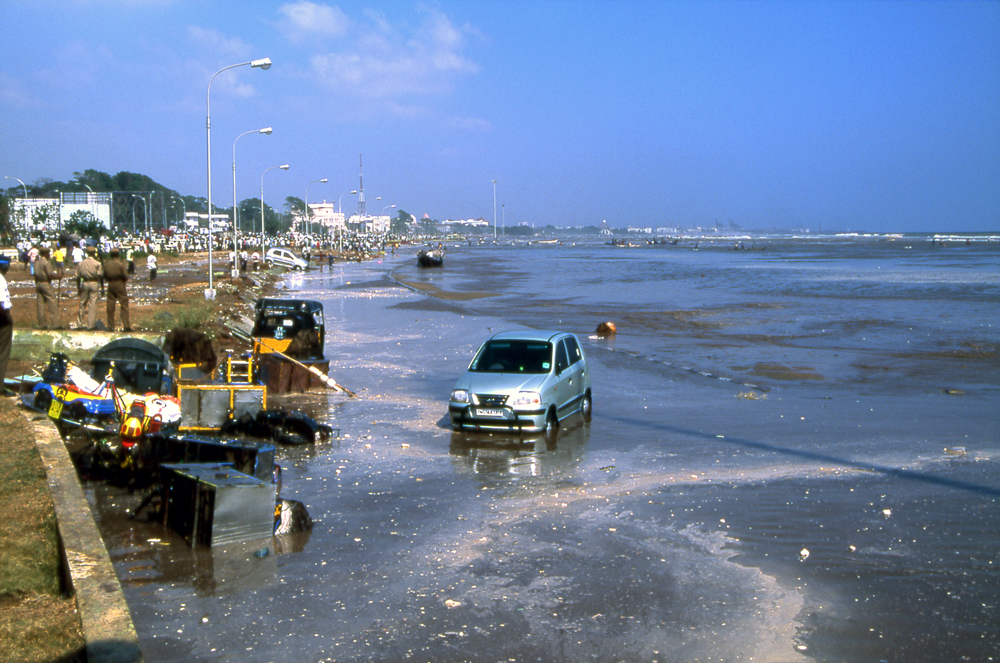
Chennai's Marina Beach after the tsunami

The level of damage to the economy resulting from the tsunami depends on the scale examined. While the overall impact on the national economies was minor, local economies were devastated. The two main occupations most affected by the tsunami were fishing and tourism. Some economists believe that damage to the affected national economies will be minor because losses in the tourism and fishing industries are a relatively small percentage of the GDP. However, others caution that damage to infrastructure is an overriding factor. In some areas drinking water supplies and farm fields may have been contaminated for years by saltwater from the ocean.

The impact on coastal fishing communities and the people living there, some of the poorest in the region, has been devastating with high losses of income earners as well as boats and fishing gear. In Sri Lanka, artisanal fishery, in which the use of fish baskets, fishing traps, and spears are commonly used, is an important source of fish for local markets; industrial fishery is the major economic activity, providing direct employment to about 250,000 people. In recent years the fishery industry has emerged as a dynamic export-oriented sector, generating substantial foreign exchange earnings. Preliminary estimates indicated that 66% of the fishing fleet and industrial infrastructure in coastal regions were destroyed by the wave surges.

While the tsunami destroyed many of the boats vital to Sri Lanka's fishing industry, it also created a demand for fibreglass-reinforced plastic catamarans in the boatyards of Tamil Nadu. Given that over 51,000 vessels were lost to the tsunami, the industry boomed. However, the huge demand has led to lower quality in the process, and some important materials were sacrificed to cut prices for those who were impoverished by the tsunami.

Even though only coastal regions were directly affected by the waters of the tsunami, the indirect effects have spread to inland provinces as well. Since the media coverage of the event was so extensive, many tourists cancelled vacations and trips to that part of the world, even though their travel destinations may not have been affected. This ripple effect could especially be felt in the inland provinces of Thailand, such as Krabi, which acted as a starting point for many other tourist destinations in Thailand.

Countries in the region appealed to tourists to return, pointing out that most tourist infrastructure is undamaged. However, tourists were reluctant to do so for psychological reasons. Even beach resorts in parts of Thailand which were untouched by the tsunami were hit by cancellations.

Both the earthquake and the tsunami may have affected shipping in the Malacca Straits, which separate Malaysia and the Indonesian island of Sumatra, by changing the depth of the seabed and by disturbing navigational buoys and old shipwrecks. In one area of the Strait, water depths were previously up to 1,200 m (4,000 ft), and are now only 30 m (100 ft) in some areas, making shipping impossible and dangerous. These problems also made the delivery of relief aid more challenging. Compiling new navigational charts may take months or years. Officials also hoped that piracy in the region would drop off, since the tsunami had killed pirates and destroyed their boats. Due to multiple factors, there was a 71.6% drop in the number of piracy incidents between 2004 and 2005, from 60 to 17 incidents. Levels remained relatively low for some years. However, between 2013 and 2014, piracy incidents rose dramatically by 73.2% to exceed pre-tsunami levels.

=== Historical context ===
Of the ten strongest Indonesian earthquakes ≥ 8.3 M_{w}, six occurred near Sumatra

The last major tsunami in the Indian Ocean was about A.D. 1400. In 2008, a team of scientists working on Phra Thong, a barrier island along the hard-hit west coast of Thailand, reported evidence of at least three previous major tsunamis in the preceding 2,800 years, the most recent from about 700 years ago. A second team found similar evidence of previous tsunamis in Aceh, a province at the northern tip of Sumatra; radiocarbon dating of bark fragments in the soil below the second sand layer led the scientists to estimate that the most recent predecessor to the 2004 tsunami probably occurred between A.D. 1300 and 1450.

The 2004 earthquake and tsunami combined is the world's deadliest natural disaster since the 1976 Tangshan earthquake. The earthquake was the third-most-powerful earthquake recorded since 1900. The deadliest-known earthquake in history occurred in 1556 in Shaanxi, China, with an estimated death toll of 830,000, though figures from this period may not be as reliable.

Before 2004, the tsunami created in both Indian and Pacific Ocean waters by the 1883 eruption of Krakatoa, thought to have resulted in anywhere from 36,000 to 120,000 deaths, had probably been the deadliest in the region. In 1782, about 40,000 people are thought to have been killed by a tsunami (or a cyclone) in the South China Sea. The deadliest tsunami before 2004 was Italy's 1908 Messina earthquake on the Mediterranean Sea where the earthquake and tsunami killed about 123,000.

=== Other effects ===
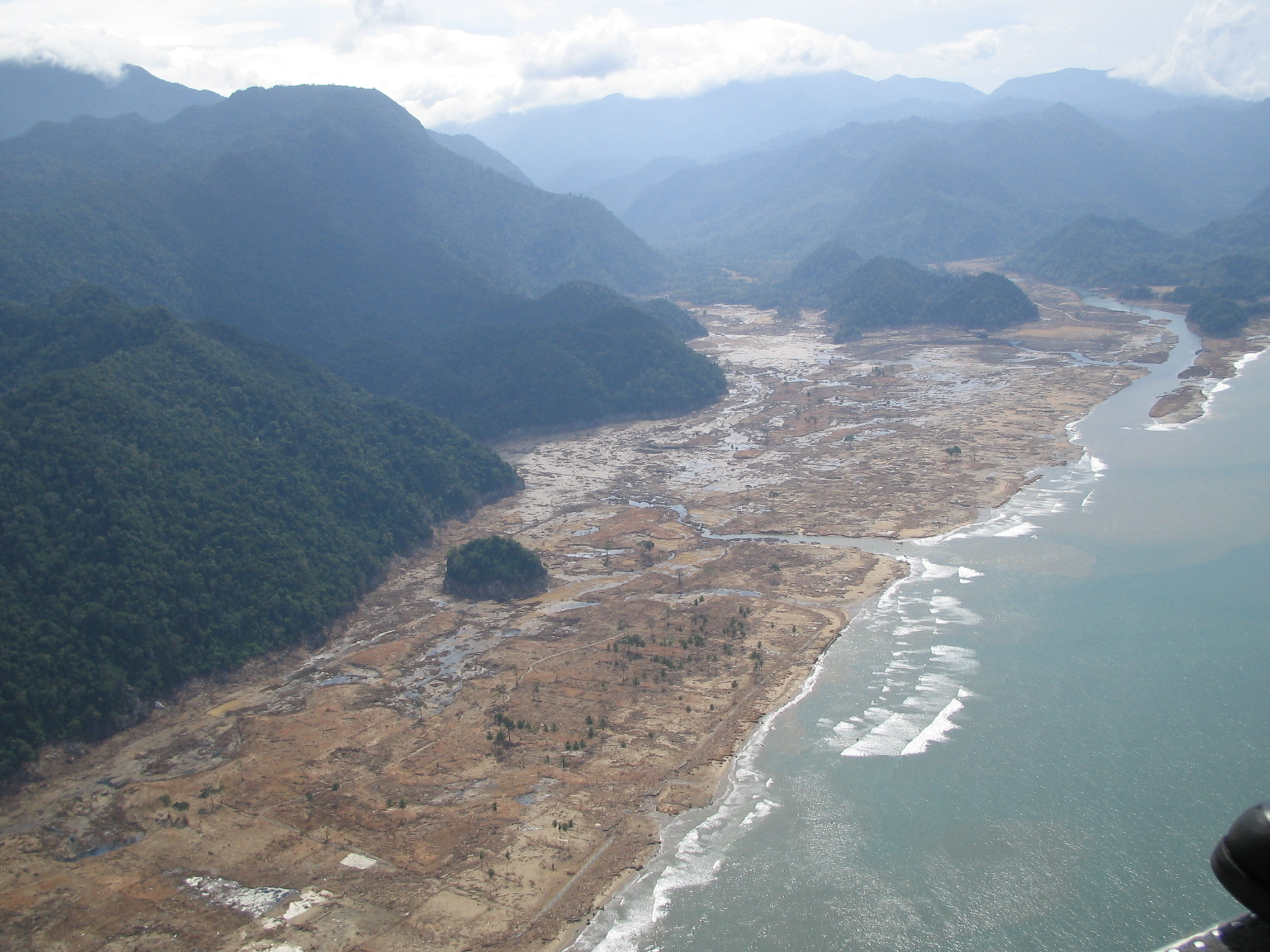
Tsunami aftermath in Aceh, Indonesia

Many health professionals and aid workers have reported widespread psychological trauma associated with the tsunami. Even 14 years afterwards, researchers find HPA axis dysregulation and "burnout" in survivors. Those with severe psychological trauma appear to have lower thyroid hormone levels, and could be more prone to obesity, heart disease, and high cholesterol. People in communities hit by the tsunami were found to have lower levels of the T3 hormone. They also found lower cortisol levels in the hair of those who were most affected, suggesting stress adaptation after high stress situations.

The hardest-hit area, Aceh, is a religiously conservative Islamic society and has had no tourism nor any Western presence in recent years due to the insurgency between the Indonesian military and Free Aceh Movement (GAM). Some believe that the tsunami was divine punishment for lay Muslims shirking their daily prayers or following a materialistic lifestyle. Others have said that Allah was angry that Muslims were killing each other in an ongoing conflict. Saudi cleric Muhammad Al-Munajjid attributed it to divine retribution against non-Muslim vacationers "who used to sprawl all over the beaches and in pubs overflowing with wine" during Christmas break. Traditional beliefs in many of the affected regions state that a relative of the family must bury the body of the dead, and in many cases, no body remained to be buried.

The widespread devastation caused by the tsunami led GAM to declare a cease-fire on 28 December 2004 followed by the Indonesian government, and the two groups resumed long-stalled peace talks, which resulted in a peace agreement signed 15 August 2005. The agreement explicitly cites the tsunami as a justification.

In a poll conducted in 27 countries, 15% of respondents named the tsunami the most significant event of the year. Only the Iraq War was named by as many respondents. The extensive international media coverage of the tsunami, and the role of mass media and journalists in reconstruction, were discussed by editors of newspapers and broadcast media in tsunami-affected areas, in special video-conferences set up by the Asia Pacific Journalism Centre.

The tsunami left both the people and government of India in a state of heightened alert. On 30 December 2004, four days after the tsunami, Terra Research notified the India government that its sensors indicated there was a possibility of 7.9 to 8.1 magnitude tectonic shift in the next 12 hours between Sumatra and New Zealand. In response, the Indian Minister of Home Affairs announced that a fresh onslaught of deadly tsunami was likely along the southern Indian coast and the Andaman and Nicobar Islands, even as there was no sign of turbulence in the region. The announcement generated panic in the Indian Ocean region and caused thousands to flee their homes, which resulted in jammed roads. The announcement was a false alarm, and the Home Affairs minister withdrew their announcement. On further investigation, the India government learned that the consulting company Terra Research was run from the home of a self-described earthquake forecaster who had no telephone listing and maintained a website where he sold copies of his detection system.

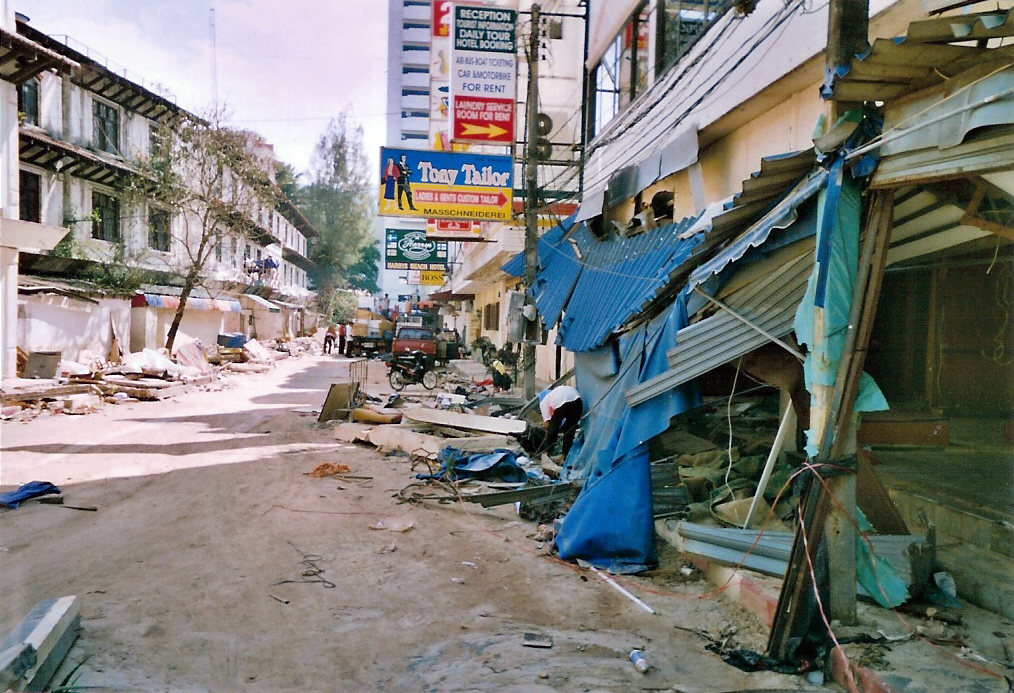
Patong Beach in Thailand after the tsunami

The tsunami had a severe humanitarian and political impact in Sweden. The hardest-hit country outside Asia, it lost 543 tourists in the disaster, mainly in Thailand. The Persson Cabinet was heavily criticized for its inaction.

Smith Dharmasaroja, a meteorologist who had predicted that an earthquake and tsunami "is going to occur for sure" in 1994, was assigned the development of the Thai tsunami warning system. The Indian Ocean Tsunami Warning System was formed in early 2005 to provide an early warning of tsunamis for inhabitants around the Indian Ocean coasts.

The changes in the distribution of masses inside the Earth due to the earthquake had several consequences. It displaced the North Pole by 25 mm (0.98 in). It also slightly changed the shape of the Earth, specifically by decreasing Earth's oblateness by about one part in 10 billion, consequentially increasing Earth's rotation a little and thus shortening the length of the day by 2.68 microseconds.

The Indian Ocean Tsunami Archives were added to the UNESCO Memory of the World register in 2017. The archive consists of video, audio, and photographs.

== Humanitarian response ==
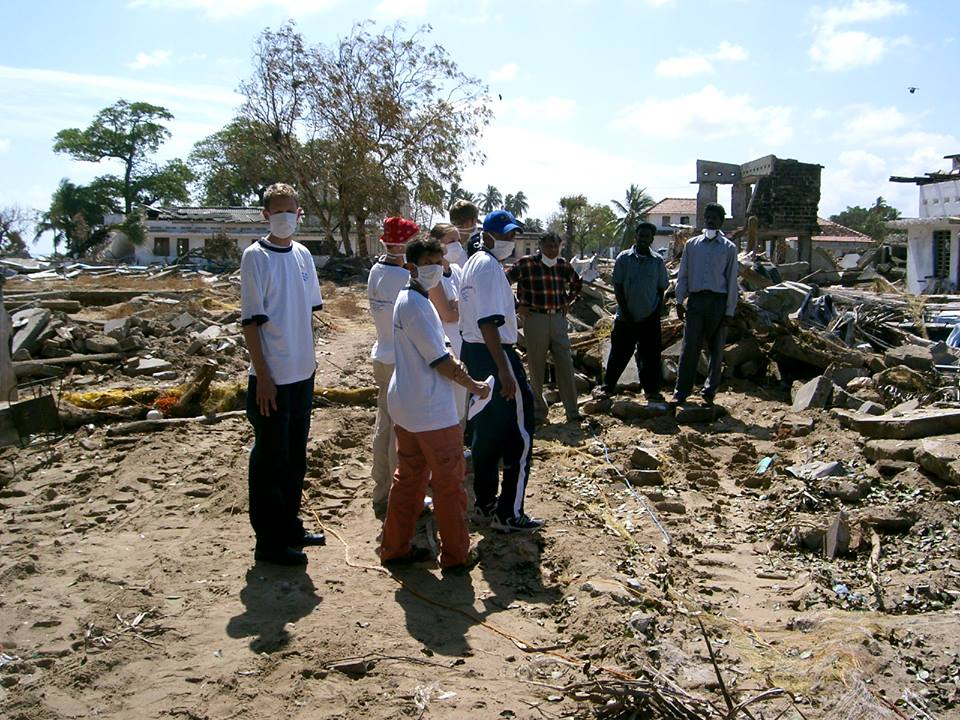
German tsunami relief mission visiting Mullaitivu in Sri Lanka's Northern Province

A great deal of humanitarian aid was needed because of widespread damage to the infrastructure, shortages of food and water, and economic damage. Epidemics were of particular concern due to the high population density and tropical climate of the affected areas. The main concern of humanitarian and government agencies was to provide sanitation facilities and fresh drinking water to contain the spread of diseases such as cholera, diphtheria, dysentery, typhoid and hepatitis A and hepatitis B.

There was also a great concern that the death toll could increase as disease and hunger spread. However, because of the initial quick response, this was minimized.

In the days following the tsunami, significant effort was spent in burying bodies hurriedly due to fear of disease spreading. However, the public health risks may have been exaggerated, and therefore this may not have been the best way to allocate resources. The World Food Programme provided food aid to more than 1.3 million people affected by the tsunami.

Nations all over the world provided over US$14 billion in aid for damaged regions, with the governments of Australia pledging US$819.9 million (including a US$760.6 million aid package for Indonesia), Germany offering US$660 million, Japan offering US$500 million, Canada offering US$343 million, Norway and the Netherlands offering both US$183 million, the United States offering US$35 million initially (increased to US$350 million), and the World Bank offering US$250 million. Also, Italy offered US$95 million, increased later to US$113 million of which US$42 million was donated by the population using the SMS system. Australia, India, Japan and the United States formed an ad-hoc corroborative group, and it was the origin of the Quadrilateral Security Dialogue.

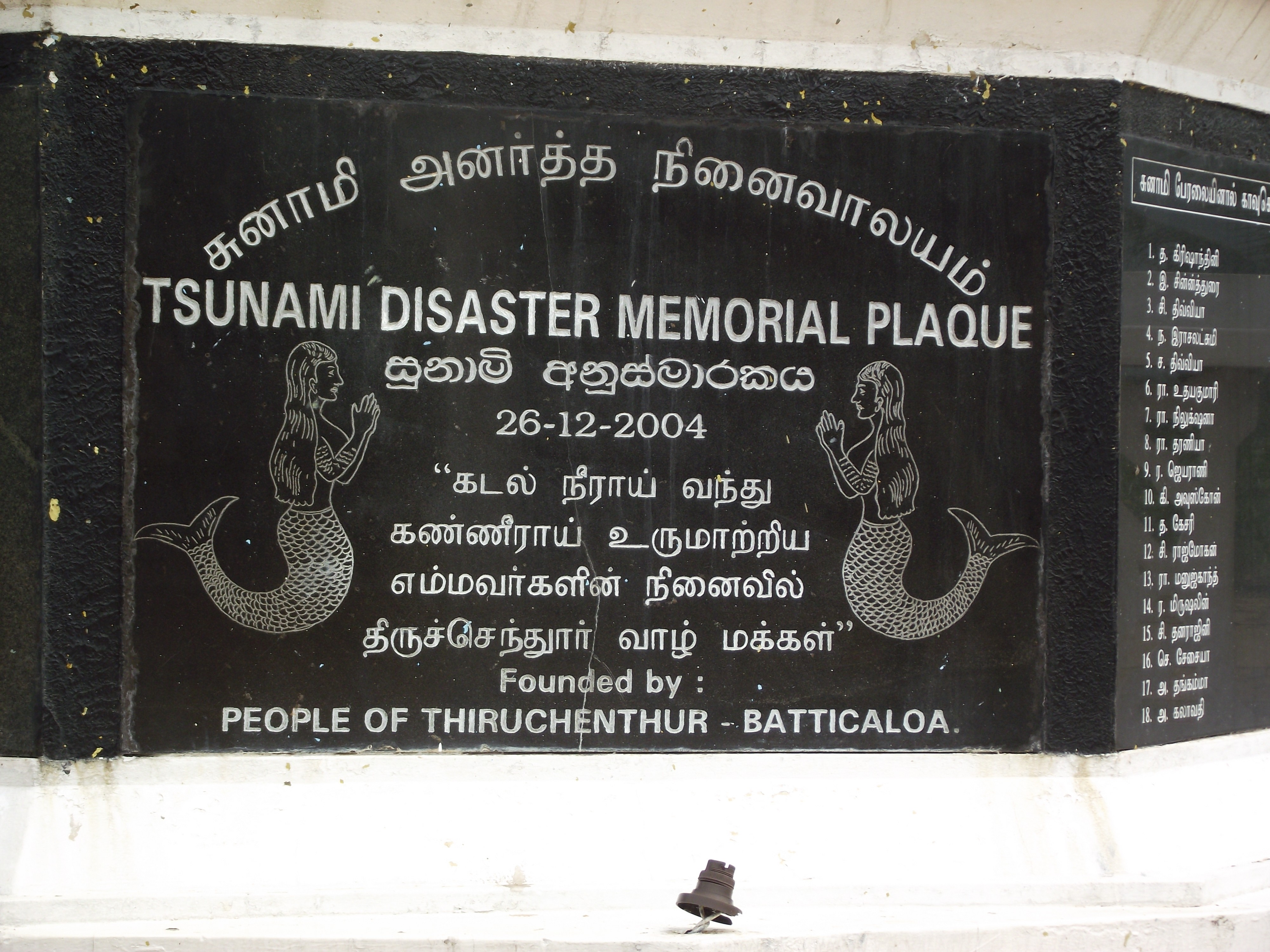
Memorial dedicated to victims of the tsunami in Batticaloa, Sri Lanka, written in Tamil

According to USAID, the US has pledged additional funds in long-term U.S. support to help the tsunami victims rebuild their lives. On 9 February 2005, President George W. Bush asked Congress to increase the U.S. commitment to a total of US$950 million. Officials estimated that billions of dollars would be needed. Bush also asked his father, former president George H. W. Bush, and former president Bill Clinton to lead a U.S. effort to provide private aid to the tsunami victims.

In mid-March, the Asian Development Bank reported that over US$4 billion in aid promised by governments was behind schedule. Sri Lanka reported that it had received no foreign government aid, while foreign individuals had been generous. Many charities were given considerable donations from the public. For example, in the United Kingdom, the public donated roughly £330 million sterling (nearly US$600 million). This considerably outweighed the allocation by the government to disaster relief and reconstruction of £75 million and came to an average of about £5.50 (US$10) donated by every citizen.

In August 2006, fifteen local aid staff working on post-tsunami rebuilding were found executed in north-east Sri Lanka after heavy fighting between government troops and the Tamil Tiger rebels, the main umbrella body for aid agencies in the country said.

== In popular culture ==
=== Film and television ===
- Children of Tsunami: No More Tears (2005), a 24-minute documentary
- The Wave That Shook the World (2005), educational television series documentary about the tsunami
- Tsunami: The Aftermath (2006), a two-part television miniseries about its aftermath
- Dasavathaaram (2008), a Tamil thriller film involving the tsunami
- Tsunami: Caught on Camera (2009), a TV documentary showcasing the tsunami through amateur video with survivor interviews
- Hereafter (2010), a main character's life is affected after surviving the tsunami while on vacation
- Hafalan Shalat Delisa (2011), an Indonesian movie with the tsunami as the initial incident
- The Impossible (2012), an English-language Spanish film based on the story of María Belón and her family
- Kayal (2014), a Tamil drama film which culminates with the tsunami
- Tsunami: Race Against Time (2024), a 20-year retrospective that chronicles some of the stories of individual heroism and tragedy

=== Literature ===
- Paint the Sky with Stars: Selected Poetry in Remembrance of the Boxing Day Tsunami 2004 (2005) edited by Stephen Robert Kuta
- The Killing Sea (2006), two teenagers struggle to survive in the days after the tsunami
- Wave (2013), a memoir by Sonali Deraniyagala
- On the Island (2012), two people stranded on a Maldives uninhabited island are rescued because of the tsunami.

=== Music ===
- "12/26" by Kimya Dawson, about the event and the humanitarian efforts, from the perspective of a victim whose family died in the disaster.
- "Where the Wave Broke" by Burst, written in memory of Mieszko Talarczyk, frontman of Swedish grindcore band Nasum (whom Burst bassist Jesper Liveröd also performed with), who died in the disaster, which led to Nasum's subsequent disbandment.

== See also ==
- Deaths in December 2004 – notable people killed in the 2004 Indian Ocean tsunami
- List of earthquakes in 2004
- List of earthquakes in Indonesia
- List of natural disasters by death toll
- Lists of earthquakes
- List of megathrust earthquakes
