= Deaths in December 2004 =

The following is a list of notable deaths in December 2004.

Entries for each day are listed alphabetically by surname. A typical entry lists information in the following sequence:

- Name, age, country of citizenship at birth, subsequent country of citizenship (if applicable), reason for notability, cause of death (if known), and reference.

== December 2004 ==
=== 1 ===
- Fathi Arafat, 71, Palestinian physician, founder of the Palestinian Red Crescent Society, stomach cancer.
- Mammad Araz, 71, Azerbaijani poet.
- Prince Bernhard of Lippe-Biesterfeld, 93, German-born Dutch royal, spouse of Queen Juliana and father of Queen Beatrix, lung and colon cancer.
- Norman Newell, 85, English record producer and lyricist.
- Damon Simonelli, 45, American planetary scientist, heart failure.
- David Vienneau, 53, Canadian journalist, pancreatic cancer.

=== 2 ===
- Larry Buchanan, 81, American B-movie director, producer and writer, complications of collapsed lung.
- Kevin Coyne, 60, English musician, filmmaker, and a writer of lyrics, stories and poems.
- Cachita Galán, 61, Argentine singer, cancer.
- Dame Alicia Markova, 94, English ballerina, stroke.
- Nadine Shamir, 32, American techno singer/songwriter, complications during childbirth.
- Louis W. Truman, 96, Senior American Army officer.
- Mona Van Duyn, 83, American poet, US Poet Laureate (1992), bone cancer.
- Ron Watson, 75, Australian rugby league footballer.

=== 3 ===
- Shiing-Shen Chern, 93, Chinese mathematician, heart failure following heart attack.
- Robert Dhéry, 83, French comedian, actor, director and screenwriter.
- Gerald FitzGerald, 8th Duke of Leinster, 90, Irish nobleman.
- June Maston, 76, Australian Olympic sprinter (1948), and athletics coach.
- Pavel Pavlov, 52, Bulgarian sprinter and Olympian (1980).
- Maria Perschy, 66, Austrian actress, cancer.
- Helmut Rix, 78, German linguist, car accident.
- Josef Schwammberger, 92, German SS (Schutzstaffel) officer and labor camp commander during World War II.
- Fred Silva, 77, American gridiron football player, heart attack.
- Marek Stachowski, 68, Polish composer.
- Yaroslav Starobogatov, 72, Russian zoologist and academic.

=== 4 ===
- Mahmut Atalay, 70, Turkish freestyle wrestler, coach, and Olympian (1964, 1968), heart attack.
- Willem Duyn, 67, Dutch singer, actor, and entertainer, heart attack.
- Carl Esmond, 102, Austrian film and stage actor.
- Tom Fitzgerald, 53, American soccer coach (University of Tampa), motorcycle accident.
- Terry Kosens, 63, American football player (Minnesota Vikings).
- Sergio Mocellini, 68, Italian bobsledder and Olympian (1964, 1968).
- Thomas Reddin, 88, American police officer.
- Elena Souliotis, 61, Greek operatic soprano, heart failure.
- Svend Wad, 76, Danish boxer and Olympic medalist (1948).
- Ron Williamson, 51, American minor league baseball player and murder convict, liver cirrhosis.

=== 5 ===
- Giuseppe Campora, 81, Italian operatic tenor.
- Seymour Ginsburg, 76, American computer scientist, Alzheimer's disease.
- Neil Hallett, 80, Belgian-English actor.
- Cristiano Júnior, 25, Brazilian footballer, cardiac arrest after on-field collision.
- Manzanita, 48, Spanish singer and guitarist, heart attack.
- Jose Pellissery, 53–54, Indian film and theatre actor.
- Øystein Rottem, 58, Norwegian philologist, literary historian and literary critic, cancer.
- Hicham Zerouali, 27, Moroccan footballer, car accident.

=== 6 ===
- Frank Reginald Carey, 92, British fighter ace during World War II.
- Raymond Goethals, 83, Belgian soccer coach, colorectal cancer.
- Árpád Makay, 93, Hungarian cinematographer.
- Adrian Morris, 75, English painter.
- John Norton, 86, United States Army general.
- Enrique Salinas, 52, Mexican businessman, asphyxiation.
- Hamp Tanner, 77, American football player (Georgia Bulldogs, San Francisco 49ers, Dallas Texans).
- Christine Wodetzky, 66, German actress.

=== 7 ===
- Pacita Abad, 58, Filipino painter, lung cancer.
- Frederick Fennell, 90, American conductor, founder of Eastman Wind Ensemble.
- María Rosa Gallo, 82, Argentine actress, pneumonia.
- Julije Knifer, 80, Croatian abstract painter.
- Floyd Nattrass, 86, Canadian Olympic sports shooter (1964).
- Zuzana Navarová, 45, Czech singer and songwriter, cancer.
- Jay Van Andel, 80, American co-founder and former chairman of Amway, Parkinson's disease.
- Oscar M. Ruebhausen, 92, American lawyer and adviser to Governor Nelson A. Rockefeller.
- Pierre Schmitz, 84, Luxembourgian Olympic gymnast (1948).
- Jerry Scoggins, 93, American musician ("The Ballad of Jed Clampett").

=== 8 ===
- Dimebag Darrell, 38, American heavy metal guitarist (Pantera, Damageplan), shot.
- Cleve Gray, 86, American abstract painter.
- Johnny Lockett, 89, British Grand Prix motorcycle road racer.
- Jackson Mac Low, 82, American poet, composer and performance artist, complications from stroke.
- Noel Mills, 60, New Zealand rower and Olympic silver medalist (1972).
- C. S. Rao, 80, Indian actor, writer and director.
- Alberts Riekstiņš, 97, Latvian Olympic cross-country skier (1936).
- Leslie Scarman, Baron Scarman, 93, British jurist, Lord of Appeal in Ordinary (1977–1986).

=== 9 ===
- Andrea Absolonová, 27, Czech diver and adult model known as Lea De Mae, brain cancer.
- Henny Backus, 93, American actress, stroke.
- David Brudnoy, 64, American radio talk show host (Boston), Merkel cell carcinoma.
- Paul Edwards, 81, Austrian-American philosopher.
- Peter Emery, 78, British Conservative politician (Honiton, 1967–1997; East Devon, 1997–2001).
- Jimmy Gauld, 75, Scottish football player.
- Philippe Gigantès, 81, Canadian former senator, cancer.
- Jean Tournier, 78, French cinematographer.
- Sergey Voychenko, 49, Belarusian artist and designer, complications following heart bypass surgery.

=== 10 ===
- Khoren Abrahamyan, 74, Armenian actor and director.
- Bruno Arcari, 89, Italian football player player and coach.
- Norman Borrett, 87, English sportsman and Olympian (1948).
- Emilio Cruz, 66, Cuban-American artist, pancreatic cancer.
- Herbert Jäger, 78, German footballer and Olympian (1952).
- Bob King, 81, American college basketball coach (New Mexico Lobos, Indiana State Sycamores).
- Vern McKee, 74, American athlete and coach.
- Radner Muratov, 76, Soviet and Russian stage and film actor, stroke.
- Homi Wadia, 93, Indian film director and producer.
- Gary Webb, 49, American investigative reporter ("Dark Alliance"), suicide by gunshot.

=== 11 ===
- Christopher Blake, 55, English actor and screenwriter, Non-Hodgkin lymphoma.
- José Luis Cuciuffo, 43, Argentinian footballer and 1986 Football World Cup champion, hunting accident.
- Arthur Lydiard, 87, New Zealand marathon runner and athletics coach, heart attack.
- Marian Masłoń, 74, Polish footballer.
- Theodor Obrietan, 77, Austrian Olympic rower (1948).
- Harry Roesli, 53, Indonesian singer-songwriter, heart attack.
- Margaret Shaw, 101, American photographer and folklorist.
- M. S. Subbulakshmi, 88, Indian carnatic musician and singer, heart problems.
- Masao Yazawa, 89, Japanese Olympic sprinter (1936).

=== 12 ===
- Reidar Alveberg, 88, Norwegian Olympic bobsledder (1952, 1956).
- Joseph Beyrle, 81, United States Army and Soviet Red Army soldier, heart attack.
- Pramod Chakravorty, 75, Indian film producer and director.
- Herbert Dreilich, 62, German rock musician, cancer.
- Frits Helmuth, 73, Danish film actor.
- Rollin Hotchkiss, 93, American biochemist and molecular genetics pioneer.
- George Hunter, 77, South African boxer and Olympic champion (1948).
- Frank Isola, 79, American jazz drummer.
- Harry McNally, 68, English football player, coach and manager, heart attack.
- Phaswane Mpe, 34, South African novelist, AIDS-related complications.
- Fabian O'Dea, 86, Canadian lawyer and politician, Lieutenant Governor of Newfoundland and Labrador.
- Eduard Ohlinger, 37, German Olympic weightlifter (1988).
- Maurizio Perissinot, 53, Italian rally driver.
- Syed Mir Qasim, 83, Indian politician, Chief Minister of Jammu and Kashmir (1971–1975).
- William B. Rosson, 86, United States Army general, heart attack.
- Bernarda Bryson Shahn, 101, American painter, lithographer, widow of Ben Shahn.
- Pavlo Vasylyk, 78, Ukrainian Greek Catholic hierarch.

=== 13 ===
- Donald S. Jones, 76, United States Navy admiral.
- Andre Rodgers, 70, Bahamian baseball player (New York/San Francisco Giants, Chicago Cubs, Pittsburgh Pirates), first Bahamian to play in Major League Baseball.
- Tom Turesson, 62, Swedish footballer.
- David Wheeler, 77, English computer scientist.

=== 14 ===
- Curt Christensen, 84, Danish footballer.
- Candice Daly, 38, American film and TV actress (The Young and the Restless), polydrug intoxication.
- John Downey, 77, American contemporary classical composer, conductor, and pianist.
- Danny Doyle, 87, American baseball player (Boston Red Sox).
- Rod Kanehl, 70, American baseball player (New York Mets), heart attack.
- Alexey Korneyev, 65, Russian footballer.
- Anselmo López, 94, Spanish basketball coach and administrator.
- Fernando Poe Jr., 65, Filipino actor and former presidential candidate, stroke.
- Alex Sarkisian, 82, American college gridiron football player (Northwestern Wildcats).
- Agostino Straulino, 90, Italian Olympic sailor (1948, 1952, 1956, 1960, 1964).
- Carsten Peter Thiede, 52, German archaeologist and New Testament scholar, heart attack.

=== 15 ===
- Alma Duncan, 87, Canadian painter, graphic artist, and filmmaker.
- Chiang Fang-liang, 88, Belarus-Taiwanese widow of Chiang Ching-kuo and First Lady of the Republic of China (1978–1988), pulmonary and cardiac failure.
- Vassal Gadoengin, 61, Nauruan politician and then-incumbent Speaker of Parliament, heart attack.
- Jiban Ghosh, 69, Indian cricket umpire.
- Sidonie Goossens, 105, British harpist.
- Pauline LaFon Gore, 92, American lawyer.
- Jim Holliday, 55–56, American pornographic film producer and historian, complications from diabetes.
- Lucien Musset, 82, French historian, specializing in the history of the Vikings.
- Rodney O'Gliasain Kennedy-Minott, 76, American diplomat, United States Ambassador to Sweden, complications of pancreatitis.

=== 16 ===
- Ted Abernathy, 71, American baseball player.
- Laxmikant Berde, 50, Indian actor, kidney failure.
- Martha Carson, 83, American gospel-country music singer.
- Richard B. Fisher, 68, American investment banker, cancer.
- Deyda Hydara, 58, Gambian journalist and editor, homicide.
- Stefano Madia, 49, Italian actor.
- Agnes Martin, 92, American abstract painter, pneumonia.
- Bobby Mattick, 89, American former baseball player (Chicago Cubs, Cincinnati Reds), and manager (Toronto Blue Jays), stroke.
- Seymour Melman, 86, American economist and academic.
- Mahmoud Messadi, 93, Tunisian author and intellectual.
- Yehudit Naot, 60, Israeli scientist and politician, throat cancer.
- Lawrence O'Brien, 53, Canadian politician, member of the House of Commons of Canada, cancer.
- Freddie Perren, 61, American two-time Grammy Award-winning record producer, stroke.
- Prathapachandran, 63, Indian actor.
- Hans-Rudolf Rösing, 99, German U-boat commander during World War II.
- William Silverman, 87, American physician and neonatology pioneer, kidney failure.

=== 17 ===
- Erich Auer, 81, Austrian theater, film and television actor.
- Andreu Bosch, 73, Spanish footballer.
- Dick Heckstall-Smith, 70, British saxophone player (Colosseum, John Mayall and the Bluesbreakers), cancer.
- James Ling, 81, American businessman.
- Agnes Mary Mansour, 73, American Catholic nun and politician, breast cancer.
- Gyula Marsovszky, 68, Swiss Grand Prix motorcycle road racer.
- Ib Mossin, 71, Danish actor, singer and director.
- Dietrich Schwanitz, 64, German writer and literary scholar, pulmonary embolism.
- Tom Wesselmann, 73, American pop artist, surgical complications.
- Sir James Wilson, 83, British army general.

=== 18 ===
- Noel Beaton, 78, Australian MP (Bendigo, 1960–1969) and journalist.
- Freddy Chaves, 86, Belgian football player.
- Vijay Hazare, 89, Indian cricketer, captain of India (1951–1953), complications following intestinal cancer.
- Bill Jobko, 69, American football player (Los Angeles Rams, Minnesota Vikings, Atlanta Falcons).
- Mariella Lotti, 85, Italian film actress.
- Albert Nordengen, 81, Norwegian Conservative politician, Mayor of Oslo (1976–1990), heart failure.
- Eddie Oram, 90, American basketball player (Syracuse Nationals).
- Peter Palitzsch, 86, German theatre director and theatre manager.
- Anthony Sampson, 78, British journalist and author, official biographer of Nelson Mandela, heart attack.
- Kikuko, Princess Takamatsu, 92, Japanese member of the imperial family, sepsis.
- Glenn Vaughan, 60, American baseball player (Houston Colt .45s).

=== 19 ===
- Mamdouh Adwan, 63, Syrian writer, poet, playwright and critic, cancer.
- Warren Ajax, 83, American basketball player (Minneapolis Lakers).
- Gretchen Bender, 53, American video artist, cancer.
- Richard Best, 88, British film editor.
- Herbert C. Brown, 92, British Nobel Prize-winning chemist (Chemistry, 1979), heart attack.
- Vojin Jelić, 83, Croatian Serb writer and poet.
- Andrée Tainsy, 93, Belgian actress.
- Renata Tebaldi, 82, Italian opera singer, cancer.
- Gheorghe Tătaru, 56, Romanian football player.
- Thomas Yamamoto, 87, American artist.

=== 20 ===
- Liliane Maigné, 76, French actress.
- Alexander Marshack, 86, American independent scholar and paleolithic archaeologist.
- Jack Newfield, 66, American author, activist and journalist (Village Voice, New York Daily News, New York Post), kidney cancer.
- Son Seals, 62, American blues musician, complications of diabetes.

=== 21 ===
- Lennart Bernadotte, 95, Swedish prince.
- Richard Hamilton, 83, American actor (Men in Black, Pale Rider, Bret Maverick).
- Arild Nyquist, 67, Norwegian novelist, poet, children's writer and musician.
- Autar Singh Paintal, 79, Indian physiologist and medical scientist.
- Mack Vickery, 66, American musician and songwriter, heart attack.
- Zvonimir Vučković, 88, Yugoslav Chetnik military commander.

=== 22 ===
- Yusuf Soalih Ajura, 114, Ghanaian Islamic scholar, political activist and sect leader.
- Doug Ault, 54, American Major League Baseball player (Texas Rangers, Toronto Blue Jays), suicide by gunshot.
- Mario Curletto, 69, Italian Olympic fencer (1960, 1964).
- Rudi Kolak, 86, Yugoslav and Bosnian communist politician.
- Paul Métivier, 104, Canadian World War I veteran.
- Antonio Rangel, 61, Mexican badminton player.

=== 23 ===
- Reuven Adiv, 74, Israeli actor, director and drama teacher, heart attack.
- Juan Ángel Aichino, 76, Argentine Olympic rower (1948).
- Richard Barnet, 75, American political activist.
- Peter Beazley, 82, British businessman and Conservative Party politician.
- John W. Duarte, 85, British classical guitarist and writer, cancer.
- Wilmer Harris, 80, American baseball player.
- Ifor James, 73, British horn player.
- Albert Koskinen, 79, Finnish Olympic high jumper (1952).
- Roger Moorey, 67, British archaeologist and historian.
- P. V. Narasimha Rao, 83, Indian Prime Minister (1991–1996), heart attack.
- Richard Abel Smith, 71, British Army officer and landowner, stroke.
- Anne Truitt, 83, American sculptor.

=== 24 ===
- Richard Annand, 90, British soldier, first Victoria Cross recipient of World War II.
- Per Fossum, 94, Norwegian Olympic alpine skier (1936).
- Sir Anthony Meyer, 3rd Baronet, 84, British Conservative MP (West Flintshire, 1970–1983; Clwyd North-West, 1983–1992), cancer.
- Johnny Oates, 58, American MLB catcher (Baltimore Orioles, New York Yankees) and manager (Baltimore Orioles, Texas Rangers), brain tumor.
- Pete Palangio, 96, Canadian ice hockey player (Montreal Canadiens, Detroit Cougars, Chicago Black Hawks).
- Rosemary Rue, 76, British physician and civil servant, breast cancer, colorectal cancer.
- Elwira Seroczyńska, 73, Polish Olympic speed skater (1960, 1964).
- Lauri Silvennoinen, 88, Finnish Olympic cross-country skier (1948).
- Elmer Swenson, 91, American horticulturist and pioneering grape breeder.

=== 25 ===
- Ahmad Bashir, 81, Pakistani writer, journalist, and film director.
- Sandy Cameron, 66, Canadian politician.
- Nripen Chakraborty, 99, Indian politician.
- Amaechi Ottiji, 34, Nigerian football player, shot.
- Donald Pederson, 79, American electrical engineer, complications from Parkinson's disease.
- Antony Preston, 66, British naval historian and writer.
- Alfred Schrottenbaum, 66, Austrian footballer.
- Eddie Spicer, 82, English footballer (Liverpool F.C.).
- Gennadi Strekalov, 64, Russian cosmonaut, Hero of the Soviet Union, cancer.
- Ian Syster, 28, South African long-distance runner and Olympian (2004), drowned.
- Lev Vainshtein, 88, Soviet world champion and Olympic bronze medalist in shooting (1952).
- Howie Williams, 77, American basketball player and Olympian (1952).

=== 26 ===
- Charles Biederman, 98, American abstract artist.
- Jonathan Drummond-Webb, 45, South African paediatric heart surgeon, suicide by opioid overdose.
- Garard Green, 80, British actor.
- Marianne Heiberg, 59, Norwegian diplomat, Oslo Accords mediator, heart attack.
- Eddie Layton, 79, American organist (New York Yankees).
- David McKay, 83, Australian journalist and racing driver, cancer.
- Don Nygord, 68, American Olympic sports shooter (1984, 1988).
- Sir Angus Ogilvy, 76, British businessman, husband of HRH Princess Alexandra, The Honourable Lady Ogilvy, throat cancer.
- Frank Pantridge, 88, British physician and cardiologist.
- Ishigaki Rin, 84, Japanese poet.
- Martin Robertson, 93, British classical scholar and poet.
- Mikhail Smirtyukov, 95, Soviet politician and statesman.
- Reggie White, 43, American football player (Philadelphia Eagles, Green Bay Packers) and member of the Pro Football Hall of Fame, cardiac arrhythmia.
- Notable people killed in the 2004 Asian tsunami:
  - Jane Attenborough, 49, British arts administrator.
  - Troy Broadbridge, 24, Australian Football League player (Melbourne).
  - Kristina Fröjmark, 47, Swedish reality TV star.
  - Poom Jensen, 21, Thai prince.
  - Sujeewa Kamalasuriya, 39, Sri Lankan cricketer.
  - Sigurd Køhn, 45, Norwegian composer.
  - Stephen Lissenburgh, 40, British policy researcher.
  - Markus Sandlund, 29, Swedish cellist.
  - Aki Sirkesalo, 42, Finnish musician.
  - Mieszko Talarczyk, 30, Swedish musician.
  - Robert Whymant, 60, British journalist (The Times) and author.

=== 27 ===
- Eneko Arieta, 71, Spanish footballer.
- Eros Beraldo, 75, Italian football player.
- Mabel Blythe, 74, Sri Lankan actress and singer.
- Ferenc Bessenyei, 85, Hungarian actor and singer.
- Hank Garland, 74, American studio guitarist (Elvis Presley, Charlie Parker), staphylococcus infection.
- Ernest Groth, 82, American baseball player (Cleveland Indians, Chicago White Sox).
- Heorhiy Kirpa, 58, Ukrainian industrialist and politician, shot.
- Luigi Mariotti, 92, Italian politician.
- Kenneth Rosén, 53, Swedish footballer.
- José Esteban Valle, 62, Nicaraguan Olympic racewalker (1968, 1972).
- Dave Worthy, 70, Canadian politician, member of the House of Commons of Canada (1988-1993).

=== 28 ===
- Birger Andersson, 79, Finnish Olympic rower (1952).
- Dan DeSantis, 86, American football player (Philadelphia Eagles).
- Jacques Dupuis, 81, Belgian Jesuit priest and theologian.
- Jerry Orbach, 69, American actor (Law & Order, Beauty and the Beast, Dirty Dancing), Tony winner (1969), prostate cancer.
- Johnny Pawk, 94, American basketball player.
- Susan Sontag, 71, American author, literary theorist and activist, acute myeloid leukemia.
- Tzvi Tzur, 81, Israeli officer and politician.
- Bones Weatherly, 76, American football player (Rice Owls, Chicago Bears).

=== 29 ===
- Julius Axelrod, 92, American Nobel Prize-winning biochemist (Medicine, 1970).
- William Boyett, 77, American actor (Adam-12), complications from pneumonia and kidney failure.
- John Bridgeman, 88, British sculptor.
- Ken Burkhart, 89, American Major League Baseball pitcher (St. Louis Cardinals, Cincinnati Reds), and umpire, emphysema.
- Alf Evers, 99, American historian.
- Eugenio Garin, 95, Italian philosopher and renaissance historian.
- Ermanno Gorrieri, 84, Italian politician and economist.
- Liddy Holloway, 57, New Zealand actress (Shortland Street, Prisoner, Without a Paddle) and writer, liver cancer.
- Dick LeGrand, 84, American sound editor.
- Larry McNeill, 53, American National Basketball Association player.
- Gus Niarhos, 84, American baseball player (New York Yankees, Chicago White Sox, Boston Red Sox, Philadelphia Phillies).
- Esther Thelen, 63, American developmental psychologist and cognitive scientist.
- Paul Vallé, 77, British Olympic sprinter (1948).

=== 30 ===
- Saad Al-Dosari, 27, Saudi Arabian football player, traffic collision.
- Salvatore Asta, 89, Italian prelate of the Catholic Church.
- Annibale Berton, 68, Italian Olympic canoeist (1960).
- Biswajit Das, 68, Indian playwright, short story writer, and film director.
- Louise Delescluse, 93, French Olympic gymnast (1928).
- Bob Ferguson, 65, American football player (Ohio State Buckeyes, Pittsburgh Steelers, Minnesota Vikings).
- Mark Fiennes, 71, English photographer and illustrator.
- Rıza Maksut İşman, 90, Turkish Olympic athlete (1948).
- Masao Kato, 57, Japanese go player, stroke.
- Marcelo Sajen, 39, Argentine serial rapist, suicide by gunshot.
- Ionel Schein, 77, Romanian-French architect.
- Artie Shaw, 94, American jazz musician, complications of diabetes.

=== 31 ===
- Aladi Aruna, 71, Indian politician, murdered.
- John Chataway, 57, Canadian politician, complications from stroke.
- Charlie Cozart, 85, American baseball player (Boston Braves).
- Gérard Debreu, 83, French-American Nobel Prize-winning economist (Economics, 1983).
- Franz Eichberger, 91, Austrian Olympic middle-distance runner (1936).
- Jack Karwales, 84, American football player (Chicago Bears, Chicago Cardinals).
- Cliff Letcher, 52, Australian tennis player.
- Balkrishan Singh, 71, Indian Olympic field hockey player (1956).
- Kuini Speed, 55, Fijian chief and politician, cancer.
- George Wackenhut, 85, American businessman, founder of Wackenhut Corporation, heart failure.
