= Royal Marriages Act 1772 =

Act of the Parliament of Great Britain

Royal Marriages Act 1772 (Note: The citation of this act by this short title was authorised by section 1 of, and the first schedule to, the Short Titles Act 1896. Due to the repeal of those provisions it is now authorised by section 19(2) of the Interpretation Act 1978.)
- Act of Parliament
- Parliament of Great Britain
- Long title: An Act for the better regulating of the future Marriages of the Royal Family.
- Citation: 12 Geo. 3. c. 11
- Territorial extent: Great Britain

Dates
- Royal assent: 1 April 1772
- Commencement: 21 January 1772 (Note: Start of session.)
- Repealed: 26 March 2015 (Note: The Succession to the Crown Act 2013 (Commencement) Order 2015 (SI 2015/894).)
Other legislation
Amended by	Statute Law Revision Act 1888; Criminal Law Act 1967
Repealed by	Succession to the Crown Act 2013

Status: Repealed

Text of statute as originally enacted

Revised text of statute as amended

The Royal Marriages Act 1772 (12 Geo. 3. c. 11) was an act of the Parliament of Great Britain which prescribed the conditions under which members of the British royal family could contract a valid marriage, in order to guard against marriages that could diminish the status of the royal house. The right of veto vested in the sovereign by this Act provoked severe adverse criticism at the time of its passage.

The whole act was repealed as a result of the 2011 Perth Agreement, which came into force on 26 March 2015. Under the Succession to the Crown Act 2013, the first six people in the line of succession need permission to marry if they and their descendants are to remain in the line of succession.

== Provisions ==
The act said that no descendant of King George II, male or female, other than the issue of princesses who had married or might thereafter marry "into foreign families", could marry without the consent of the reigning monarch, "signified under the great seal and declared in council". That consent was to be set out in the licence and in the register of the marriage, and entered in the books of the Privy Council. Any marriage contracted without the consent of the monarch was to be null and void.

However, any member of the royal family over the age of 25 who had been refused the sovereign's consent could marry one year after giving notice to the Privy Council of an intention to marry, unless both houses of Parliament expressly declared their disapproval. There was, however, no instance in which the sovereign's consent in Council was formally refused, though there was one where it was sought but the request ignored and others where it was not sought because it was likely to be refused.

The act further made it a crime to perform or participate in an illegal marriage of any member of the royal family. This provision was repealed by the Criminal Law Act 1967.

== Rationale ==
The act was proposed by George III as a direct result of the marriage in 1771 of his brother, Prince Henry, Duke of Cumberland and Strathearn, to the commoner Anne Horton, widow of Christopher Horton and daughter of the first Lord Irnham, MP. Royal assent was given to the Act on 1 April 1772, and it was only on 13 September following that the king learned that another brother, Prince William Henry, Duke of Gloucester and Edinburgh, had in 1766 secretly married Maria, the illegitimate daughter of Sir Edward Walpole and the widow of the 2nd Earl Waldegrave. Both alliances were considered highly unsuitable by the king, who "saw himself as having been forced to marry for purely dynastic reasons".

== Couples affected ==
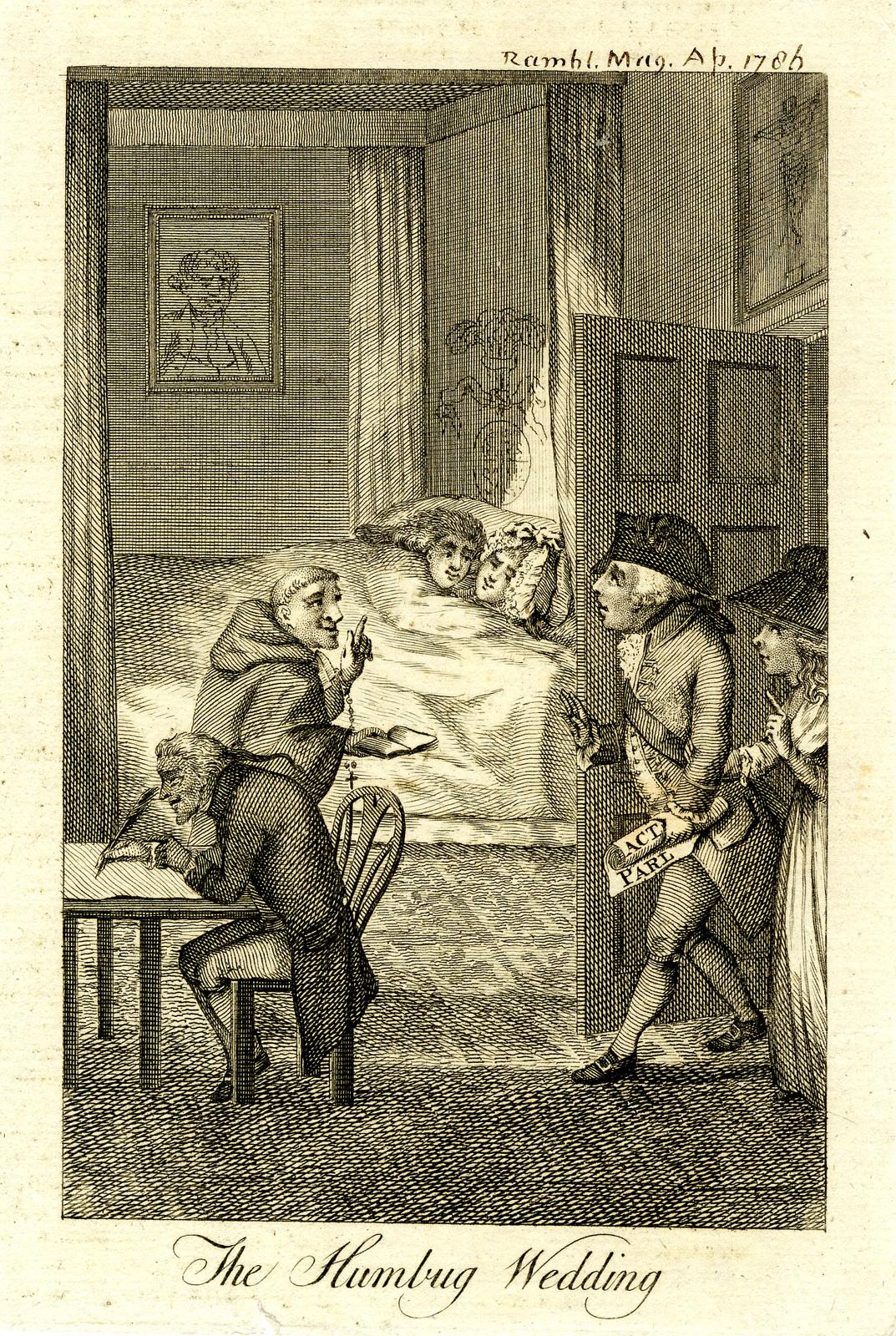
1786 etching: George, Prince of Wales and Maria Fitzherbert in a bed. George III and Queen Charlotte enter with the Act of Parliament. Beside the bed, a monk and a scribe.

- On 15 December 1785, the King's eldest son George, Prince of Wales, married privately and in contravention of this Act the twice-widowed Maria Anne Fitzherbert, a practising Catholic, at her house in Park Lane, London, according to the rites of the Church of England. This marriage was invalid under the Act. Had the marriage been valid, it would have excluded the Prince from succession to the throne under the terms of the Act of Settlement 1701, and made his brother Prince Frederick, Duke of York, the heir-apparent.
- On 29 September 1791, the King's second son Prince Frederick, Duke of York, married Princess Frederica Charlotte of Prussia, at Charlottenburg, Berlin, but the ceremony had to be repeated in London on 23 November 1791 as, although consent had been given at the Privy Council on 28 September, it had proved impossible to obtain the Great Seal in time and doubt had thus been thrown on the legality of the marriage.
- On 4 April 1793, Prince Augustus, the sixth son of the King, married Lady Augusta Murray, in contravention of the Act, first privately and without witnesses, according to the rites of the Church of England at the Hotel Sarmiento, Rome, and again, after banns, on 5 December 1793, at St George's, Hanover Square, London. Both marriages were declared null and void by the Court of Arches on 14 July 1794, and the two resulting children were subsequently considered illegitimate.
- After the death of Lady Augusta Murray, Prince Augustus (now Duke of Sussex) apparently (no contemporary evidence survives) married Lady Cecilia Buggin, about 2 May 1831, at her house in Great Cumberland Place, London, again in contravention of the Act. On that day she had taken the surname Underwood in lieu of Buggin and who, on 10 April 1840, was created Duchess of Inverness by Queen Victoria (the Duke being Earl of Inverness). The Queen had thereby, as Lord Melbourne wrote, "recognized the moral and religious effect of whatever has taken place whilst she avoided the legal effects of a legal marriage which was what her Majesty was most anxious to do". Acceptance of the marriage would have meant acceptance of the Duke's earlier marriage and the legitimacy of his two children. However, the couple cohabited and were socially accepted as husband and wife.
- On 8 January 1847, the Queen's first cousin Prince George of Cambridge married, by licence of the Faculty Office but in contravention of this Act, Sarah Fairbrother, a pregnant actress with four illegitimate children (two by himself and two by other men), at St James, Clerkenwell. From about 1858, Fairbrother took the name Mrs. FitzGeorge. The marriage was invalid, not a morganatic marriage as many have called it. It is also incorrect to say that Queen Victoria refused to consent to this marriage, as no application was made to her under the Act, it being very apparent that no consent would be given.
- After Charles Edward, Duke of Albany was deprived of his British titles under the Titles Deprivation Act 1917 due to his German loyalties during World War I, his descendants married without consent from the British monarch (the earliest in 1932). As Charles Edward was a male-line grandson of Queen Victoria, application of the Royal Marriages Act as written renders null and void for the purposes of British law the marriages of his children, despite having been lawfully contracted in Germany. (Note: According to a Home Office memorandum on the matter, "All the descendants of a British prince require the consent, even if he has become a foreign Sovereign and his family have lived abroad for generations. Thus the Hanoverian Royal Family, who are descended from George III's son, the Duke of Cumberland, who succeeded to the throne of Hanover on the accession of Queen Victoria, have regularly obtained the King's consent to their marriages: in 1937 Princess Frederica of Hanover, great-great granddaughter of George III and 3rd cousin once removed of the King, asked his consent to her wedding with the Crown Prince of Greece. It seems absurd that the King's consent should be obtained for a purely foreign marriage of this kind; one can only suppose that as the marriage would not be valid in the British Dominions without it, the object is to secure the position of the issue as Princes or Princesses of Great Britain (which rank is much valued on the Continent) and possibly to retain their place in the line of succession to the British Throne. Obviously the absence of the Royal Consent required by British law could not affect the validity of a marriage contracted abroad so far as the law of the country of domicile of the parties is concerned. It should be noted here that the Act applies to all marriages in which one of the parties is a descendant of George II, whether contracted in Great Britain or abroad. See as to this the decision of the House of Lords, given after taking the opinion of the Judges, in the Sussex Peerage case (xi Clark and Finelly, 85 ff.)")
- The only known case in which permission to marry was withheld by the British sovereign despite a formal request under the Royal Marriages Act is that of Prince George William of Hanover, a German citizen descended from King George III, whose father and grandfather were deprived of their British titles under the Titles Deprivation Act 1917 due to their German loyalties during World War I. On 23 April 1946, George William married Princess Sophie of Greece and Denmark, who was about to become a kinswoman to the British royal family as her brother Prince Philip was courting the future Queen Elizabeth II. Their request for permission from King George VI received no response due to sensitivity over the fact that a state of war still existed between the United Kingdom and Germany, (Note: After consultations with the Foreign Office, Home Office and King George VI's private secretary, Sir Alan Lascelles, a ciphered telegram dated 18 April 1946 and crafted by Sir Albert Napier, permanent secretary to the Lord Chancellor, was transmitted from the British Foreign Office to the Foreign Adviser to the British Commander in Chief at Berlin: "The Duke of Brunswick has formally applied to The King by letter of March 22nd for the consent of His Majesty under the Act 12 Geo. III, cap. 11 to the marriage of his son Prince George William with Princess Sophia Dowager Princess of Hesse. The marriage is understood to be taking place on April 23rd. Please convey to the Duke an informal intimation that in view of the fact that a state of war still exists between Great Britain and Germany, His Majesty is advised that the case is not one in which it is practicable for His consent to be given in the manner contemplated by the Act.") and it was held by British officials at the time that the marriage and its issue would not be legitimate in the United Kingdom despite being legal in Germany.

== Broad effects ==
The act rendered void any marriage wherever contracted or solemnised in contravention of it. A member of the royal family who contracted a marriage that violated the Act did not thereby lose his or her place in the line of succession, but the offspring of such a union were made illegitimate by the voiding of the marriage and thus lost any right to succeed.

The act applied to Catholics, even though they are ineligible to succeed to the throne. It did not apply to descendants of Sophia of Hanover who are not also descendants of George II, even though they are still eligible to succeed to the throne.

It had been claimed that the marriage of Prince Augustus had been legal in Ireland and Hanover, but the Committee of Privileges of the House of Lords ruled (in the Sussex Peerage Case, 9 July 1844) that the Act incapacitated the descendants of George II from contracting a legal marriage without the consent of the Crown, either within the British dominions or elsewhere.

All European monarchies, and many non-European realms, have laws or traditions requiring prior approval of the monarch for members of the reigning dynasty to marry. But Britain's was unusual because it was never modified between its original enactment and its repeal 243 years later, so that its ambit grew rather wide, affecting not only the British royal family, but more distant relatives of the monarch.

== Farran exemption ==
In the 1950s, Charles d'Olivier Farran, Lecturer in Constitutional Law at Liverpool University, theorised that the act could no longer apply to anyone living, because all the members of the immediate royal family were descended from British princesses who had married into foreign families. The loophole is due to the act's wording, whereby if a person is, through one line, a descendant of George II subject to the act's restriction, but is also, separately through another line, a descendant of a British princess married into a foreign family, the exemption for the latter reads as if it trumps the former.

Many of George II's descendants in female lines have married back into the British royal family. In particular, Queen Elizabeth II and other members of the House of Windsor descend through Queen Alexandra from two daughters of King George II, Princesses Mary and Louise, who married foreign rulers, respectively Landgrave Frederick II of Hesse-Kassel and King Frederick V of Denmark, and through Queen Mary from a third, Princess Anne, who married Prince William IV of Orange. Queen Mary herself was a product of such a marriage; her parents were Princess Mary Adelaide of Cambridge, a granddaughter of George III and Francis, Duke of Teck, a minor German prince of the House of Württemberg. Moreover, King Charles III, his issue, siblings, and their issue descend from yet another such marriage, that of Princess Alice, a daughter of Queen Victoria, to Grand Duke Louis IV of Hesse, through their great-grandson Prince Philip, Duke of Edinburgh.

This so-called "Farran exemption" met with wide publicity, but arguments against it were put forward by Clive Parry, Fellow of Downing College, Cambridge, and Farran's interpretation has since been ignored. Consent to marriages in the royal family (including the distantly related House of Hanover) continued to be sought and granted as if none of the agnatic descendants of George II were also his cognatic descendants.

Parry argued that the "Farran exemption" theory was complicated by the fact that all the Protestant descendants of the Electress Sophia of Hanover, ancestress of the United Kingdom's monarchs since 1714, had been entitled to British citizenship under the Sophia Naturalization Act 1705 (if born prior to 1949, when the act was repealed). Thus, some marriages of British princesses to continental monarchs and princes were not, in law, marriages to foreigners. For example, the 1947 marriage of Princess Elizabeth to Prince Philip, Duke of Edinburgh, by birth a Greek and Danish prince but descended from the Electress Sophia, was a marriage to a British subject even if he had not been previously naturalised in Britain. This would also mean theoretically, for example, that the present royal family of Norway was bound by the Act, for the marriage of Princess Maud, a daughter of King Edward VII, to the future King Haakon VII of Norway, was a marriage to a "British subject", since Haakon descended from the Electress Sophia.

== Exemption of the former Edward VIII ==
The His Majesty's Declaration of Abdication Act 1936 (1 Edw. 8 & 1 Geo. 6. c. 3) specifically excluded Edward VIII from the provisions of this act upon his abdication, allowing him to marry the divorcée, Wallis Simpson. The wording of the act also excluded any issue of the marriage both from being subject to the act, and from the succession to the throne; no marriages or succession rights were ultimately affected by this language, as the Duke and Duchess of Windsor had no children.

== Perth Agreement ==
In October 2011 David Cameron wrote to the leaders of the other Commonwealth realms proposing that the Act be limited to the first six people in line to the throne. The leaders approved the proposed change at the Commonwealth Heads of Government Meeting held in Perth, Western Australia.

The legislation in a number of Commonwealth realms repeals the Royal Marriages Act 1772 in its entirety. It was, in the United Kingdom, replaced by the Succession to the Crown Act 2013, which stipulates a requirement for the first six people in the line of succession to obtain the sovereign's consent before marrying in order to remain eligible. Subsection 3(5) of the new Act also provides that, except for succession purposes, any marriage that would have been void under the original Act "is to be treated as never having been void" if it did not involve any of the first six people in the line of succession at the time of the marriage; royal consent was never sought or denied; "in all the circumstances it was reasonable for the person concerned not to have been aware at the time of the marriage that the Act applied to it"; and no one has acted on the basis that the marriage is void. New Zealand's Royal Succession Act 2013 repealed the Royal Marriages Act and provided for royal consent for the first six people in the line of succession to be granted by the monarch in right of the United Kingdom.

== Other legislation ==
The Regency Act 1830, which provided for a regency in the event that Queen Victoria inherited the throne before she was eighteen, made it illegal for her to marry without the regent's consent. Her spouse and anyone involved in arranging or conducting the marriage without such consent would be guilty of high treason. This was more serious than the offence created by the Royal Marriages Act 1772, which was equivalent to praemunire. However, the Regency Act 1830 never came into force, as Victoria had already turned 18 a few weeks before becoming queen.

== Consents for marriages under the act ==
Consents under the act were entered in the Books of the Privy Council but have not been published. In 1857 it became customary to publish them in the London Gazette and notices appear of consents given in Council at Courts held on the following dates. Not all consents were there and gaps in the list have been filled by reference to the Warrants for Royal Marriages in the Home Office papers (series HO 124) in The National Archives:

Date	Applicant	Spouse	Gazetted
28 September 1791	Prince Frederick, Duke of York and Albany	Princess Frederica of Prussia	"No. 13347". The London Gazette. 27 September 1791. p. 541. HO124/1.
17 December 1794	George, Prince of Wales	Princess Caroline Amelia of Brunswick	not gazetted; HO124/2.
3 May 1797	Charlotte, Princess Royal	Frederic, Hereditary Prince of Württemberg	not gazetted; HO124/3.
15 August 1814	Prince Ernest, Duke of Cumberland and Teviotdale	Frederica, Dowager Princess of Solms	not gazetted; HO124/4.
9 March 1816	Princess Charlotte Augusta	Prince Leopold of Saxe-Coburg-Saalfeld	not gazetted; HO124/5.
2 April 1816	Princess Mary	Prince William Frederick, Duke of Gloucester and Edinburgh	not gazetted; HO124/7
8 June 1816	Princess Elizabeth	Frederick VI, Landgrave of Hesse-Homburg	not gazetted; HO124/6.
22 April 1818	Prince Adolphus, Duke of Cambridge	Princess Augusta of Hesse-Kassel	not gazetted; HO124/8.
11 May 1818	Prince Edward, Duke of Kent and Strathearn	Victoria, Dowager Princess of Leiningen	not gazetted; HO124/9.
7 July 1818	Prince William, Duke of Clarence and St Andrews	Princess Adelaide of Saxe-Meiningen	not gazetted; HO124/10.
13 June 1842	George, Crown Prince of Hanover	Princess Marie of Saxe-Altenburg	copy in HO45/8927.
2 November 1842	Princess Augusta of Cambridge	Friedrich, Hereditary Grand Duke of Mecklenburg	HO124/11.
16 May 1857	Victoria, Princess Royal	Prince Frederick of Prussia	"No. 22003". The London Gazette. 19 May 1857. p. 1768.
30 April 1861	Princess Alice	Prince Ludwig of Hesse	"No. 22507". The London Gazette. 3 May 1861. p. 1889.
1 November 1862	Albert Edward, Prince of Wales	Princess Alexandra of Denmark	"No. 22677". The London Gazette. 4 November 1862. p. 5201.
5 December 1865	Princess Helena	Prince Christian of Schleswig-Holstein	"No. 23046". The London Gazette. 5 December 1865. p. 6451.
19 May 1866	Princess Mary Adelaide of Cambridge	Francis, Prince of Teck	"No. 23118". The London Gazette. 22 May 1866. p. 3065.
24 October 1870	Princess Louise	John Campbell, Marquess of Lorne	"No. 23682". The London Gazette. 25 November 1870. p. 5215., in substitution of "No. 23671". The London Gazette. 25 October 1870. p. 4593.
17 July 1873	Prince Alfred, Duke of Edinburgh	Grand Duchess Maria Alexandrovna of Russia	"No. 24000". The London Gazette. 22 July 1873. p. 3449. in substitution of "No. 23999". The London Gazette. 18 July 1873. p. 3379.
16 May 1878	Prince Arthur, Duke of Connaught and Strathearn	Princess Louise Margaret of Prussia	"No. 24583". The London Gazette. 21 May 1878. p. 3161. HO124/17.
27 November 1878	Ernest Augustus, Crown Prince of Hanover	Princess Thyra of Denmark	"No. 24653". The London Gazette. 6 December 1878. p. 6987.
18 March 1880	Princess Frederica of Hanover	Baron Alfons von Pawel-Rammingen	"No. 24824". The London Gazette. 19 March 1880. p. 2133. HO124/19.
29 November 1881	Prince Leopold, Duke of Albany	Princess Helena of Waldeck and Pyrmont	"No. 25043". The London Gazette. 29 November 1881. p. 6459. "No. 25044". The London Gazette. 2 December 1881. p. 6463.
27 January 1885	Princess Beatrice	Prince Henry of Battenberg	"No. 25436". The London Gazette. 27 January 1885. p. 357.
5 July 1889	Princess Louise of Wales	Alexander Duff, 6th Earl Fife	"No. 25953". The London Gazette. 12 July 1889. p. 3765.
3 July 1891	Princess Marie Louise of Schleswig-Holstein	Prince Aribert of Anhalt	"No. 26179". The London Gazette. 3 July 1891. p. 3593. "No. 26180". The London Gazette. 7 July 1891. p. 3595.
12 December 1891	Prince Albert Victor, Duke of Clarence and Avondale	Princess Victoria Mary of Teck	"No. 26233". The London Gazette. 15 December 1891. p. 6911. He died before they could marry, and she later married his brother – see below
28 June 1892	Princess Marie of Edinburgh	Ferdinand, Crown Prince of Romania	"No. 26303". The London Gazette. 1 July 1892. p. 3784.
16 May 1893	Prince George, Duke of York	Princess Victoria Mary of Teck	"No. 26404". The London Gazette. 19 May 1893. p. 2897.
29 January 1894	Princess Victoria Melita of Saxe-Coburg and Gotha	Ernest Louis, Grand Duke of Hesse	"No. 26480". The London Gazette. 30 January 1894. p. 584.
19 October 1894	Prince Adolphus of Teck	Lady Margaret Grosvenor	"No. 26562". The London Gazette. 19 October 1894. p. 5859.
21 November 1895	Princess Maud of Wales	Prince Carl of Denmark	"No. 26692". The London Gazette. 24 December 1895. p. 7425., in substitution of consent dated 12 November 1895 published "No. 26691". The London Gazette. 20 December 1895. p. 7365.
12 December 1895	Princess Alexandra of Saxe-Coburg and Gotha	Ernst, Hereditary Prince of Hohenlohe-Langenburg	"No. 26692". The London Gazette. 24 December 1895. p. 7425., in substitution of notice published "No. 26691". The London Gazette. 20 December 1895. p. 7365.; HO124/30.
15 May 1900	Princess Marie Louise of Hanover	Prince Maximilian of Baden	"No. 27203". The London Gazette. 19 June 1900. p. 3811.
16 November 1903	Princess Alice of Albany	Prince Alexander of Teck	"No. 27616". The London Gazette. 16 November 1903. p. 7013. "No. 27617". The London Gazette. 17 November 1903. p. 7015.
7 March 1904	Princess Alexandra of Hanover	Frederick Francis IV, Grand Duke of Mecklenburg	"No. 27654". The London Gazette. 4 March 1904. p. 1517. "No. 27655". The London Gazette. 8 March 1904. p. 1521.
27 February 1905	Charles Edward, Duke of Saxe-Coburg and Gotha	Princess Victoria Adelaide of Schleswig-Holstein	"No. 27769". The London Gazette. 28 February 1905. p. 1493.
20 March 1905	Princess Margaret of Connaught	Prince Gustaf Adolf, Duke of Scania	"No. 27776". The London Gazette. 17 March 1905. p. 2167. "No. 27777". The London Gazette. 21 March 1905. p. 2169.
17 March 1913	Prince Ernest Augustus of Hanover	Princess Victoria Louise of Prussia	"No. 28700". The London Gazette. 17 March 1913. p. 2053.
12 August 1913	Prince Arthur of Connaught	Princess Alexandra, 2nd Duchess of Fife	"No. 28745". The London Gazette. 12 August 1913. p. 5729.
11 February 1919	Princess Patricia of Connaught	Commander Alexander Ramsay	"No. 31174". The London Gazette. 11 February 1919. p. 2147. HO124/38 wanting, see C188/3 for Warrant for Royal Marriage.
22 November 1921	Princess Mary	Henry Lascelles, Viscount Lascelles	"No. 32529". The London Gazette. 25 November 1921. p. 9459.
12 February 1923	Prince Albert, Duke of York	Lady Elizabeth Bowes-Lyon	"No. 32795". The London Gazette. 13 February 1923. p. 1063.
26 June 1923	Princess Maud of Fife	Charles Carnegie, Lord Carnegie	"No. 32837". The London Gazette. 26 June 1923. p. 4417.
7 October 1931	Lady May Cambridge	Captain Henry Abel Smith	"No. 33761". The London Gazette. 9 October 1931. p. 6451.
5 October 1934	Prince George	Princess Marina of Greece and Denmark	"No. 34093". The London Gazette. 5 October 1934. p. 6241.
3 October 1935	Prince Henry, Duke of Gloucester	Lady Alice Montagu-Douglas-Scott	"No. 34204". The London Gazette. 4 October 1935. p. 6199.
26 December 1937	Frederica of Hanover	Prince Paul of Greece and Denmark	"No. 34468". The London Gazette. 31 December 1937. p. 8169.
29 January 1941	Lady Iris Mountbatten	Hamilton Joseph Keyes O'Malley	not gazetted; HO124/46.
31 July 1947	Princess Elizabeth	Lieutenant Philip Mountbatten RN	"No. 38030". The London Gazette (2nd supplement). 29 July 1947. p. 3589.
28 July 1949	George Lascelles, 7th Earl of Harewood	Maria Stein	"No. 38677". The London Gazette. 29 July 1949. p. 3693.
1 August 1951	Prince Ernest Augustus of Hanover	Princess Ortrud of Schleswig-Holstein-Sonderburg-Glücksburg	not gazetted; HO124/49.
27 June 1952	Gerald Lascelles	Angela Dowding	"No. 39584". The London Gazette. 27 June 1952. p. 3517.
1 June 1956	James Carnegie, Lord Carnegie	The Hon. Caroline Dewar	"No. 40795". The London Gazette. 1 June 1956. p. 3227.
19 August 1956	Alexander Ramsay	Flora Fraser, Mistress of Saltoun	"No. 40860". The London Gazette. 21 August 1956. p. 4799.
31 July 1957	Anne Abel Smith	David Liddell-Grainger	"No. 41141". The London Gazette. 2 August 1957. p. 4563.
14 September 1959	Captain Richard Abel Smith	Marcia Kendrew	"No. 41816". The London Gazette. 15 September 1959. p. 5797.
16 March 1960	Princess Margaret	Antony Armstrong-Jones	"No. 41986". The London Gazette. 18 March 1960. p. 2025.
3 August 1960	Prince Welf Heinrich of Hanover	Princess Alexandra of Ysenburg and Budingen	not gazetted; HO124/55.
24 March 1961	Prince Edward, Duke of Kent	Katharine Worsley	"No. 42314". The London Gazette. 28 March 1961. p. 2345.
19 December 1962	Princess Alexandra of Kent	The Hon. Angus Ogilvy	"No. 42864". The London Gazette. 21 December 1962. p. 9981.
26 February 1965	Elizabeth Abel Smith	Peter Wise	"No. 43590". The London Gazette. 2 March 1965. p. 2147.
28 July 1967	George Lascelles, 7th Earl of Harewood	Patricia Tuckwell	"No. 44375". The London Gazette. 28 July 1967. p. 8327.
4 February 1972	Prince Richard of Gloucester	Birgitte van Deurs	"No. 45601". The London Gazette. 17 February 1972. p. 2005.
29 March 1973	James Lascelles	Fredericka Duhrssen	"No. 45947". The London Gazette. 6 April 1973. p. 4481.
24 July 1973	Princess Anne	Captain Mark Phillips	"No. 46036". The London Gazette. 26 July 1973. p. 8761.
1 August 1979	Prince Michael of Kent	Baroness Marie Christine von Reibnitz	not gazetted; HO124/62.
15 November 1978	Gerald Lascelles	Elizabeth Evelyn Collingwood	not gazetted; HO124/63 lost while on loan to government department.
6 February 1979	David Lascelles, Viscount Lascelles	Margaret Messenger	"No. 47770". The London Gazette. 13 February 1979. p. 1994.
26 June 1979	Henry Lascelles	Alexandra Morton	"No. 47892". The London Gazette. 28 June 1979. p. 8129.
13 February 1980	Katharine Fraser, Mistress of Saltoun	Captain Mark Nicholson	"No. 48099". The London Gazette. 18 February 1980. p. 2573.
28 July 1980	Katharine Abel Smith	Hubert Beaumont	"No. 48264". The London Gazette. 29 July 1980. p. 10715.
27 March 1981	Charles, Prince of Wales	Lady Diana Spencer	Records of the Privy Council Office
10 June 1981	Prince Ernst August Georg of Brunswick-Luneburg	Countess Monika zu Solms-Laubach	"No. 48638". The London Gazette. 12 June 1981. p. 7956.
10 June 1981	Prince Ernst August Albert of Hanover	Chantal Hochuli	"No. 48638". The London Gazette. 12 June 1981. p. 7956.
16 May 1986	Prince Andrew	Sarah Ferguson	"No. 50524". The London Gazette. 22 May 1986. p. 6909. "No. 50533". The London Gazette. 30 May 1986. p. 7279.
10 February 1987	David Carnegie, Earl of Macduff	Caroline Bunting	"No. 50833". The London Gazette. 13 February 1987. p. 1951.
15 September 1987	Prince Ludwig Rudolph of Hanover	Countess Ysabelle of Thurn and Valassina-Como-Vercelli	"No. 51069". The London Gazette. 23 September 1987. p. 11789.
23 March 1988	James Ogilvy	Julia Rawlinson	"No. 51318". The London Gazette. 26 April 1988. p. 4957.
24 July 1990	Alice Ramsay of Mar	David Ramsey	"No. 52252". The London Gazette. 23 August 1990. p. 13701.
11 February 1992	Lady Helen Windsor	Timothy Taylor	"No. 52856". The London Gazette. 9 March 1992. p. 4173.
11 December 1992	Anne, Princess Royal	Commander Tim Laurence	"No. 53133". The London Gazette. 11 December 1992. p. 20898.
28 July 1993	David Armstrong-Jones, Viscount Linley	Serena Stanhope	"No. 53385". The London Gazette. 28 July 1993. p. 12599.
22 June 1994	Lady Sarah Armstrong-Jones	Daniel Chatto	"No. 53715". The London Gazette. 27 June 1994. p. 9221.
13 April 1999	Prince Edward	Sophie Rhys-Jones	"No. 55474". The London Gazette. 4 May 1999. p. 4929.
11 April 2001	Lady Alexandra Carnegie	Mark Etherington	Privy Council Orders for 11 April 2001
11 December 2001	Charles Liddell-Grainger	Eugenie Campagne	Privy Council Orders for 11 December 2001
17 April 2002	Alexander Windsor, Earl of Ulster	Claire Booth	"No. 56545". The London Gazette. 22 April 2002. p. 4888. Privy Council Orders for 17 April 2002
10 December 2003	Henry Lascelles	Fiona Wilmott	Privy Council Orders for 10 December 2003
20 July 2004	Lady Davina Windsor	Gary Lewis	Privy Council Orders for 20 July 2004
2 March 2005	Charles, Prince of Wales	Camilla Parker Bowles	Privy Council Orders for 2 March 2005
10 October 2006	Lord Nicholas Windsor	Paola Doimi de Lupis Frankopan	Privy Council Orders for 10 October 2006
2 May 2007	Amelia May Beaumont	Simon Peregrine Gauvain Murray	Privy Council Orders for 2 May 2007
12 December 2007	Lady Rose Windsor	George Edward Gilman	Privy Council Orders for 12 December 2007
12 February 2008	Emily Lascelles	Matthew Shard	Privy Council Orders for 12 February 2008
9 April 2008	Peter Phillips	Autumn Kelly	"No. 58674". The London Gazette. 21 April 2008. p. 6078. Privy Council Orders for 9 April 2008
9 October 2008	Charles Montagu Liddell-Grainger	Martha Margaretha de Klerk	Privy Council Orders for 9 October 2008
11 February 2009	Benjamin George Lascelles	Carolina Velez	Privy Council Orders for 11 February 2009
10 June 2009	Lord Frederick Windsor	Sophie Winkleman	Privy Council Orders for 10 June 2009
9 February 2011	Prince William of Wales	Catherine Middleton	Privy Council Orders for 9 February 2011
10 May 2011	Zara Phillips	Mike Tindall	Privy Council Orders for 10 May 2011
10 May 2011	Mark Lascelles	Judith Kilburn	Privy Council Orders for 10 May 2011
12 December 2012	Louise Nicolson	Charles Morshead	Privy Council Orders for 12 December 2012
11 February 2014	Edward Lascelles	Sophie Cartlidge	Privy Council Orders for 11 February 2014
11 February 2015	Juliet Victoria Katharine Nicolson	Simon Alexander Rood	Privy Council Orders for 11 February 2015

After the effective date of the Succession to the Crown Act 2013 on 26 March 2015, royal consents to marriages for the first six persons in the line of succession are given under that Act, rather than under the Royal Marriages Act 1772.

== See also ==
- Marriage Act
