= Stephen Lissenburgh =

British policy researcher, economist, school teacher

- Born: Stephen Peter Lissenburgh; 30 April 1964
- Died: 26 December 2004 (aged 40); Yala National Park, Southern Province, Sri Lanka
- Cause of death: 2004 Indian Ocean earthquake and tsunami
- Citizenship: British
- Education: Little Ilford School
- Alma mater: Cambridge University
- Occupations: policy researcher, economist, schoolteacher
- Spouse: Sonali Deraniyagala (m. 1990)
- Children: 2

Stephen Peter Lissenburgh (30 April 1964 – 26 December 2004), also known as Steve Lissenburgh, was a British policy researcher, economist and schoolteacher. He was married to Sri Lankan-born economist Sonali Deraniyagala. He was one of the victims of the 2004 Indian Ocean earthquake and tsunami which claimed an estimated 230,000 lives across South and Southeast Asia.

== Early life ==
Lissenburgh grew up in the East End of London. He attended Little Ilford School in Manor Park, London for his primary-level education. He studied Economics at Girton College, Cambridge, one of the constituent colleges of the University of Cambridge. He met his future wife in Sonali Deraniyagala at Cambridge.

== Career ==
Following the completion of his degree from the University of Cambridge, he became a secondary school teacher at impoverished and underprivileged inner-city schools. He also collaborated with his wife Sonali to focus on educational projects in Sri Lanka, targeting underprivileged children.

He resumed his post-graduate studies after five years of teaching and completed a master's degree in industrial relations at Warwick School. He then returned to the University of Cambridge to pursue a doctorate in economics. His PhD focused on discrimination against women, connecting economics and sociological methods by applying a paradigm shift approach to tackle societal injustices and challenges.

He began his career in the field of policy research at the age of 30. He entered the Policy Studies Institute (PSI) in the level of junior research grade in 1994. He rose to head a large research group and up until his untimely demise, he played an instrumental role in policy evaluations in the field of labour market disadvantage. His most important early contribution in his field of work came in the form of a research paper titled 'Value for Money' on the costs and benefits of distributing equal rights for part-time workers, which he wrote on a small-budget fund granted by the Trades Union Congress.

He moved to the Institute for Public Policy Research (IPPR) in 1997 where he worked on university–industry knowledge transfer-related aspects. By around 1998, he left IPPR and rejoined the Policy Studies Institute, where he became involved in several projects and produced many publications on the topic of unemployment.

He was known for his people management skills and social skills, exemplified by his coordination of nine co-authors in a complex project proposal on the Government's New Deal in 2000–01. The study was successfully published in 2001 as 'New Deal for Young People: National Survey of Participants, Stage 2'.

== Death ==
In December 2004, he, his two sons Vikram and Nikhil, and his in-laws were swept away during the 2004 Indian Ocean tsunami while on holiday at Yala National Park, Sri Lanka. Lissenburgh was 40 at the time. His wife Sonali was the sole survivor. The tragedy was later recounted in her critically acclaimed 2013 memoir Wave, which details the events of the tsunami and its aftermath.
