= Henry Abel Smith =

British Army officer and Governor of Queensland (1900–1993)

Colonel The Honourable Sir Henry Abel Smith KCMG, KCVO, DSO
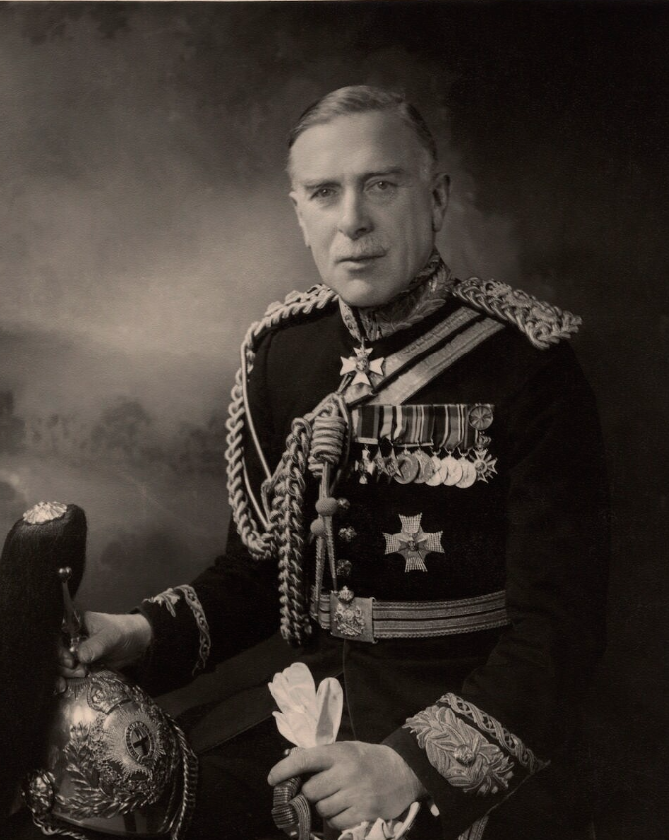

17th Governor of Queensland
- In office 18 March 1958 – 18 March 1966
- Monarch: Elizabeth II
- Premier: Sir Frank Nicklin
- Preceded by: Sir John Lavarack
- Succeeded by: Sir Alan Mansfield

Personal details
- Born: 8 March 1900 St George Hanover Square, London, England
- Died: 24 January 1993 (aged 92) Barton Lodge, Winkfield, Berkshire, England
- Resting place: Royal Burial Ground, Frogmore
- Spouse: Lady May Cambridge (m. 1931)
- Children: Anne Abel Smith; Richard Abel Smith; Elizabeth Wise

Military service
- Allegiance: United Kingdom
- Branch/service: British Army
- Years of service: 1919–1950
- Rank: Colonel
- Unit: Royal Horse Guards
- Commands: 2nd Household Cavalry Regiment
- Battles/wars: Second World War
- Awards: Knight Commander of the Order of St Michael and St George; Knight Commander of the Royal Victorian Order; Companion of the Distinguished Service Order

Arms of Smith: Or, a chevron cotised sable between three demi-griffins couped of the last the two in chief respecting each other. These are the arms of Smith/Carington, Baron Carrington and of Smith, Baron Bicester, both descendants of the banker Abel Smith II (1717–1788)

Colonel Sir Henry Abel Smith, KCMG, KCVO, DSO (8 March 1900 – 24 January 1993) was a British Army officer who served as Governor of Queensland, Australia. He married Lady May Cambridge, a niece of Queen Mary, consort of King George V.

== Early life and family ==
Abel Smith was born in London on 8 March 1900, the eldest son of Lieutenant Colonel Francis Abel Smith (1861–1908) of Wilford House, Nottinghamshire, and of Coleorton Hall, Leicestershire, and of Selsdon Park, a descendant of the prominent banking Smith family founded by Abel Smith (1717–1788), by his wife Madeline St. Maur Seymour (1862–1951), a descendant of Edward Seymour, 8th Duke of Somerset.

His grandparents were Henry Abel Smith (1826–1890) and Elizabeth Mary Pym (1826–1877), a daughter of Francis Pym (1790–1860) and Lady Lucy Leslie-Meville (1796–1848), a daughter of Alexander Leslie-Melville, 9th Earl of Leven. His younger brother was Brigadier Sir Alexander Abel Smith (1904–1980), whose second wife was Henriette Alice Cadogan (d.2005), a descendant of the 4th Earl Cadogan, who between 1949 and 1987 served as a lady-in-waiting to Princess Elizabeth (later Queen Elizabeth II).

== Career ==
Abel Smith attended Eton College and subsequently the Royal Military College, Sandhurst, where on 17 December 1919 he was commissioned as a second lieutenant into the Royal Horse Guards. Promoted on 17 December 1921 to lieutenant, between 1928 and 1930 he served as aide-de-camp (ADC) to Alexander Cambridge, 1st Earl of Athlone, whose daughter he later married. He was promoted to captain on 1 February 1930 and major on 26 June 1934.

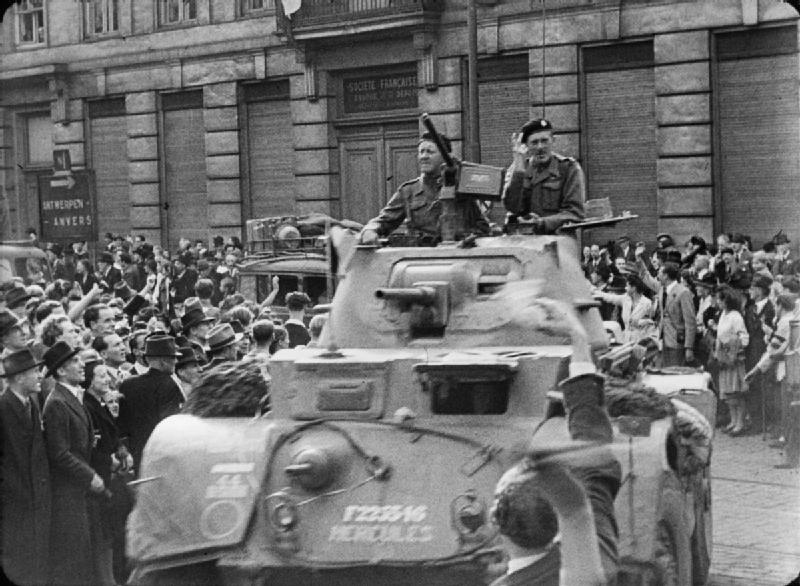
Scenes of jubilation as British troops liberate Brussels, 4 September 1944. Lieutenant Colonel Henry Abel Smith, CO of the 2nd Household Cavalry Regiment, arrives in his Staghound armoured car.

Abel Smith served in the Second World War, where from 1941 to 1945 he commanded the 2nd Household Cavalry Regiment, leading it throughout the entire North West Europe Campaign from June 1944 shortly after D-Day to Victory in Europe Day in May 1945. He was appointed a Companion of the Distinguished Service Order in February 1945. In 1944 he was promoted to lieutenant colonel and in 1946 colonel. He retired as a colonel in 1950. In 1953 he was appointed a Deputy Lieutenant of Berkshire. On 18 March 1958 Abel Smith was appointed Governor of Queensland in Australia and served in that office until 18 March 1966.

== Marriage and progeny ==
On 24 October 1931, at St Mary's Church, Balcombe, Sussex, Abel Smith married Lady May Cambridge, the only surviving child of his former commander, Alexander Cambridge, 1st Earl of Athlone. She was born Princess May of Teck, and was a niece of King George V and Queen Mary, and a great-granddaughter of Queen Victoria. By his wife he had three children:

- Anne Mary Sibylla Abel Smith (born 28 July 1932); on 14 December 1957 she married David Liddell-Grainger (26 January 1930 – 12 March 2007); they were divorced in 1981 but have five children and eight grandchildren. Her eldest son is Ian Liddell-Grainger, a Conservative Party Member of Parliament.
- Colonel Richard Francis Abel Smith (11 October 1933 – 23 December 2004); he married Marcia Kendrew (born 27 March 1940) on 28 April 1960, a daughter of Sir Douglas Kendrew, a Governor of Western Australia; they have one daughter and four grandchildren.
- Elizabeth Alice Abel Smith (5 September 1936 – 2 August 2026); on 29 April 1965 at St Paul's Church, Knightsbridge, she married Peter Wise (29 December 1929 – 16 November 2021), a shipping executive. The wedding was attended by Queen Elizabeth the Queen Mother, Princess Marina, Duchess of Kent and Princess Sybilla of Sweden and Princess Margaretha. Peter Wise was the son of Captain Anthony Forster Wise by his wife Eva Elizabeth Glentworth Baillie (1904–1976), daughter of Ronald Hugh Baillie, D.L., O.B.E., of the Royal Horse Guards (son of Lt.-Gen. Duncan Baillie). Peter Wise's sister Elizabeth Ursula Forster Wise (1924–1993) married Michael Baillie, 3rd Baron Burton. Peter Wise's grandfather was Bernhard Ringrose Wise (1858–1916), an Australian politician and Attorney General of New South Wales. They divorced in 1975 having had one daughter Emma Charlotte Abel Wise (1 Sept 1973 - 9 June 1974) who died in infancy.

== Death and burial ==
Abel Smith died at home at Barton Lodge, Winkfield, Berkshire, on 24 January 1993 aged 92, just weeks away from his 93rd birthday. His funeral service took place at St George's Chapel, Windsor Castle. His cremated remains were buried at the Royal Burial Ground, Frogmore. His wife survived him by sixteen months.

== Honours ==
- 1961: Knight Commander of the Order of St Michael and St George (KCMG)
- 1958: Knight of Justice of the Most Venerable Order of the Hospital of Saint John of Jerusalem (KStJ)
- 1953: Recipient of the Queen Elizabeth II Coronation Medal
- 1950: Knight Commander of the Royal Victorian Order (KCVO)
- 1945: Companion of the Distinguished Service Order (DSO)
- 1937: Recipient of the King George VI Coronation Medal

Government offices
Preceded by Sir John Lavarack	Governor of Queensland; 1958–1966	Succeeded by Sir Alan Mansfield
