= Lady May Abel Smith =

Member of the British royal family (1906–1994)

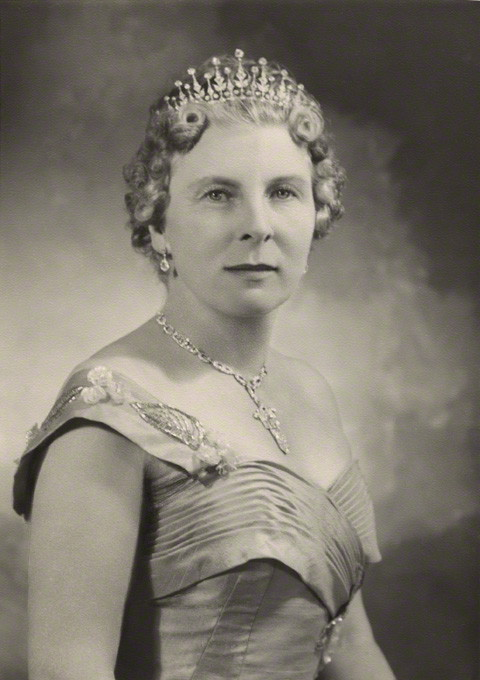
- Born: Princess May Helen Emma of Teck; 23 January 1906; Claremont, Esher, Surrey, England
- Died: 29 May 1994 (aged 88); Cromwell Hospital, London, England
- Buried: 9 June 1994; Royal Burial Ground, Frogmore
- Noble family: Teck/Cambridge
- Spouse: Sir Henry Abel Smith (m. 1931; died 1993)
- Issue: Anne Liddell-Grainger; Richard Abel Smith; Elizabeth Wise
- Father: Alexander Cambridge, 1st Earl of Athlone
- Mother: Princess Alice of Albany

Lady May Helen Emma Abel Smith (formerly Lady May Cambridge, née Princess May of Teck; 23 January 1906 – 29 May 1994) was a member of the British royal family. On her mother's side, she was a great-granddaughter of Queen Victoria, and on her father's side, a great-great-granddaughter of King George III (paternal grandfather of Queen Victoria) and the niece of Queen Mary (née Princess Mary of Teck). She led a private life in Britain. From 1958 until 1966, she lived in Brisbane, while her husband, Sir Henry Abel Smith, served as the governor of Queensland.

== Early life ==
She was born as Her Serene Highness Princess May Helen Emma of Teck at Claremont House, near Esher in Surrey, England. Her parents were Prince Alexander of Teck, great-grandson of King George III, and the former Princess Alice of Albany, granddaughter of Queen Victoria. She was named May after her paternal aunt Princess Victoria Mary of Teck (later Queen Mary) who was married to King George V, Helen after her maternal grandmother Princess Helena, Duchess of Albany and Emma after her maternal great-aunt Queen Emma of the Netherlands. During the First World War, anti-German feeling led her family to abandon their German titles. Princess May of Teck thus became known as Lady May Cambridge, after her father assumed the last name Cambridge and was granted the Earldom of Athlone.

Lady May served as a bridesmaid in 1919 to Princess Patricia of Connaught; in 1922 to her first cousin Princess Mary; and in 1923 to Lady Elizabeth Bowes-Lyon on her marriage to Mary's brother the Duke of York (later King George VI).

== Marriage ==
On 24 October 1931 in St Mary's Church, Balcombe, Sussex, the parish church of the Athlone residence of Brantridge Park, Lady May married Colonel Sir Henry Abel Smith, then a lieutenant in the Royal Horse Guards serving as aide-de-camp (ADC) to Lady May's father the Earl of Athlone. He was the eldest son of Lieutenant-Colonel Francis Abel Smith (1861–1908) of Wilford House, Nottinghamshire, of Coleorton Hall, Leicestershire, and of Selsdon Park, a member of the prominent Smith family of bankers. One of Lady May's bridesmaids was the 5-year-old Princess Elizabeth of York, the future Queen Elizabeth II, her first cousin-once-removed. Another of the bridesmaids, Princess Ingrid of Sweden, introduced her brother, Prince Gustaf Adolf to his future wife, Princess Sibylla of Saxe-Coburg and Gotha, who was also a bridesmaid.

In 1958 Sir Henry Abel Smith was appointed by Queen Elizabeth II as Governor of Queensland in Australia and served in that office until 1966. The marriage of Sir Henry and Lady May was long-lived and the couple celebrated their 61st wedding anniversary a few months before Sir Henry's death in January 1993. They had three children:

- Anne Mary Sibylla Abel Smith (born 28 July 1932), who married David Liddell-Grainger of Ayton Castle, Scottish Borders on 14 December 1957 at St George's Chapel, Windsor Castle. Amongst the bridesmaids were Princesses Beatrix and Irene of the Netherlands and Princess Christina of Sweden. They were the parents of four sons (including Conservative MP Ian Liddell-Grainger) and one daughter, before divorcing in 1981.
- Colonel Richard Francis Abel Smith (11 October 1933 – 23 December 2004), who married Marcia Kendrew (b. 1940), a daughter of Sir Douglas Kendrew, a future Governor of Western Australia. They had a daughter, Katherine Emma Abel Smith.
- Elizabeth Alice Abel Smith (5 September 1936 – 2 August 2026), who married Peter Ronald Wise (1929–2021) in 1965. They divorced in 1975, after having had one daughter who died in infancy.

== Titles, styles, and honours ==
=== Titles and styles ===
- 23 January 1906 – 14 July 1917: Her Serene Highness Princess May of Teck
- 14 July 1917 – 17 July 1917: Miss May Cambridge
- 17 July 1917 – 24 October 1931: Lady May Cambridge
- 24 October 1931 – 29 May 1994: Lady May Abel Smith

=== Honours ===
- United Kingdom:
  - Recipient of the King George VI Coronation Medal.
  - Recipient of the Queen Elizabeth II Coronation Medal.

== Later life ==
Lady May, being only a distant relative of the royal family, did not carry out any royal duties. She attended some major royal events such as the coronation of Elizabeth II and the wedding of Charles, Prince of Wales, and Lady Diana Spencer. Between 1958 and 1966, Sir Henry Abel Smith served as the governor of Queensland. Lady May accompanied him to Brisbane as vice-regal consort. They retired in 1975 to Barton Lodge at Winkfield in Berkshire, England.

Lady May died in hospital one year after her husband. They are both buried at the Royal Burial Ground, Frogmore, not far from Windsor Castle. Her funeral was held at St George's Chapel, Windsor Castle, Windsor, on 9 June 1994. It was attended by the Duke of Gloucester and Princess Alexandra, representing the royal family.
