= Anne Abel Smith =

British aristocrat and charity volunteer (born 1932)

- Born: Anne Mary Sibylla Abel Smith; 28 July 1932 (age 94)
- Other name: Anne Liddell-Grainger
- Education: King's Hall Compton
- Spouse: David Liddell-Grainger (m. 1957; div. 1981)
- Children: 5, including Ian Liddell-Grainger
- Parents: Sir Henry Abel Smith (father); Lady May Cambridge (mother)

Anne Mary Sibylla Abel Smith (formerly Liddell-Grainger; born 28 July 1932) is a British aristocrat and Christian charity worker. A great-great-granddaughter of Queen Victoria, the second cousin of Queen Elizabeth II and King Carl XVI Gustaf and the third cousin of Queen Beatrix, she was married for 25 years to Scottish politician David Liddell-Grainger and is the mother of former Conservative politician Ian Liddell-Grainger. In her sixties, she attended gospel meetings in Kennington, did missionary work in Africa, and was often invited to Royal Ascot and other functions by the Queen. As of October 2026, she is the oldest living descendant of Queen Victoria following the death of Princess Astrid of Norway on 11 September 2026.

== Early life and education ==
Anne was born Anne Mary Sibylla Abel Smith to Lady May Cambridge (formerly Princess May of Teck) and Sir Henry Abel Smith in 1932. She was the eldest of their three children and older sister to Richard and Elizabeth. She is a direct descendant of Queen Victoria; her maternal grandmother was Princess Alice of Albany, the eldest daughter of Victoria's youngest son, Prince Leopold. Her maternal grandfather was Alexander Cambridge, 1st Earl of Athlone, the youngest son of Francis, Duke of Teck and Princess Mary Adelaide of Cambridge, a granddaughter of King George III through his seventh son, Prince Adolphus; the Earl of Athlone's only sister was Queen Mary, the wife of King George V.

She attended King's Hall Compton in Sherbrooke, Quebec, Canada when she was twelve.

== Personal life ==
Anne married David Liddell-Grainger, a Scottish politician, on 14 December 1957. Their wedding ceremony was held at St. George's Chapel in Windsor Castle. Anne was attended by eight bridesmaids, among them Princesses Beatrix and Irene of the Netherlands, and Princess Christina of Sweden, and wore a veil made for Queen Mary's wedding and a diamond tiara which was loaned to her by a cousin.

The couple had five children, including Ian Liddell-Grainger, who became the first direct descendant of Queen Victoria to be elected to the House of Commons in 2001.

In 1963, Anne and her husband took ownership of two Pharaoh hounds while vacationing in Malta. In the following years, they made an effort to try to introduce the breed to the United Kingdom; in 1966, only ten Pharaoh hounds were recorded in the United Kingdom, with the couple owning five at Ayton Castle in Scotland.

She divorced Liddell-Grainger after almost 25 years of marriage in 1981.

== Charity work ==
In a rare interview in 1998, Abel Smith told The Mirror that she was a frequent passenger on board the hospital ship MV Anastasis, paying her own way to join Christian missions to third world countries as a volunteer.

Lines of succession
Preceded by Archibald Murray	Line of succession to the British throne descendant of Prince Leopold, son of Queen Victoria	Succeeded by Ian Liddell-Grainger
