= Sonali Deraniyagala =

Sri Lankan economist (born 1964)

- Born: 1964 (age 61–62); Colombo, Sri Lanka
- Education: Cambridge University; University of Oxford
- Occupations: Economist, memoirist
- Spouses: Stephen Lissenburgh (m. 1990; died 2004); Fiona Shaw (m. 2018)
- Children: 2 (both deceased)

Sonali Deraniyagala (born 1964) is a Sri Lankan economist and memoirist. She is a Research Associate at the SOAS Department of Economics.

== Personal life ==
She was born in Colombo, Sri Lanka, to lawyer (Justin) Edward Pieris Deraniyagala and Gemini Deraniyagala.

In 1990, she married economist Stephen Lissenburgh.

During a vacation at Sri Lanka's Yala National Park in December 2004, she lost her husband, their two sons, her parents, her best friend, and her best friend's mother in the Indian Ocean tsunami. The tsunami carried her two miles inland. She survived by clinging on to a tree branch. She reportedly suffered unconsciousness and internal bleeding. Following the tsunami, she stayed at her aunt's house in Colombo. Because of the trauma, she repeatedly attempted self-harm, stabbing herself with a butter knife and smashing her head on the corner of her bed's headboard. She attempted suicide and also began using alcohol.

She moved to New York at the end of 2006, where she lived in a small apartment in Greenwich Village. At the advice of her therapist, she started writing to help her process the trauma.

She started dating the actress Fiona Shaw in 2018. The couple got married after she proposed to Shaw a few months later.

She considers Joan Didion and Michael Ondaatje her literary heroes.

== Career ==
She studied economics at Cambridge University and has a doctorate from the University of Oxford.

In 2006, Deraniyagala relocated to New York where she became a visiting research scholar at Columbia University. Her well-received 2013 memoir, Wave, in which she describes her personal experiences in the aftermath of the tsunami and how she coped with it. It was shortlisted for the 2013 National Book Critics Circle Award (Autobiography) and won the PEN Ackerley Prize 2013. This book is currently used as a prose passage in the education system (O Level) for English Literature in Sri Lanka.

She is on the faculty of the Department of Economics at SOAS University of London.

She writes publicly about international economic policy, and had expressed concerns and opinions about the 2019–present Sri Lankan economic crisis.
