= Ayton Castle, Scottish Borders =

Tower house and country house in Ayton, Scottish Borders

Ayton Castle
- Part of Scottish Borders
- Near Ayton
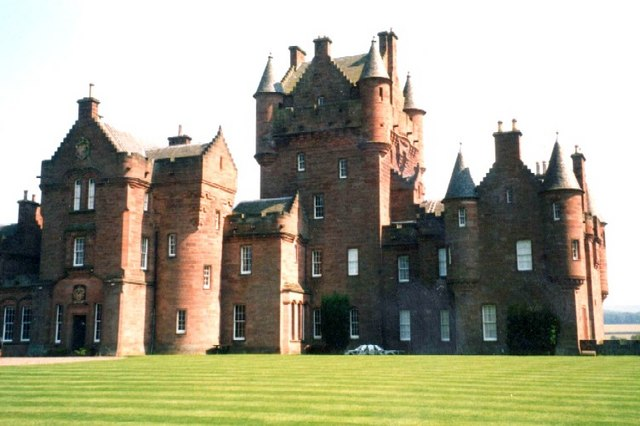
- Ayton Castle

Site information
- Type: Castle

Location
- Location in Scottish Borders, Scotland
- Location within Scottish Borders
- Coordinates: 55.8456°N 2.1148°W

Site history
- Built: c. 15th century

Designations

Inventory of Gardens and Designed Landscapes in Scotland
- Official name: Ayton Castle
- Designated: 1 July 1987
- Reference no.: GDL00033

Ayton Castle is located to the east of Ayton in the Scottish Borders. It is 9 kilometres (5.6 mi) north-west of Berwick-upon-Tweed, in the former county of Berwickshire. Built around a medieval tower house, the present castle dates largely from the 19th century. Ayton Castle is the caput of the feudal barony of Ayton. The castle is protected as a category A listed building, and the grounds are included in the Inventory of Gardens and Designed Landscapes in Scotland, the national listing of significant parks and gardens.

== History ==
The original castle, a peel tower, had once been a stronghold of the Home family. This castle was captured by the English in 1497, and the nearby church was the scene of the negotiation of the treaty of Ayton, signed on 30 September 1497. The tower was replaced by a classical mansion, which burnt down in 1834.

The estate was subsequently purchased by William Mitchell (later Mitchell-Innes) of Parsonsgreen, Edinburgh, who had been born at Belhelvie, Aberdeenshire, in 1778. William Mitchell was Chief Cashier of the Royal Bank of Scotland from 1808 to 1827. After inheriting the Parsonsgreen estate, he was an extraordinary director of the bank, 1840–1841. After further inheriting the Stow estates from a distant cousin, he hyphenated his surname and is found as William Mitchell-Innes of Parsonsgreen, an ordinary director of the bank, 1841–1853. Between these latter dates he acquired the Ayton estate, and he is recorded as William Mitchell-Innes of Ayton Castle, an ordinary director 1853–1859.

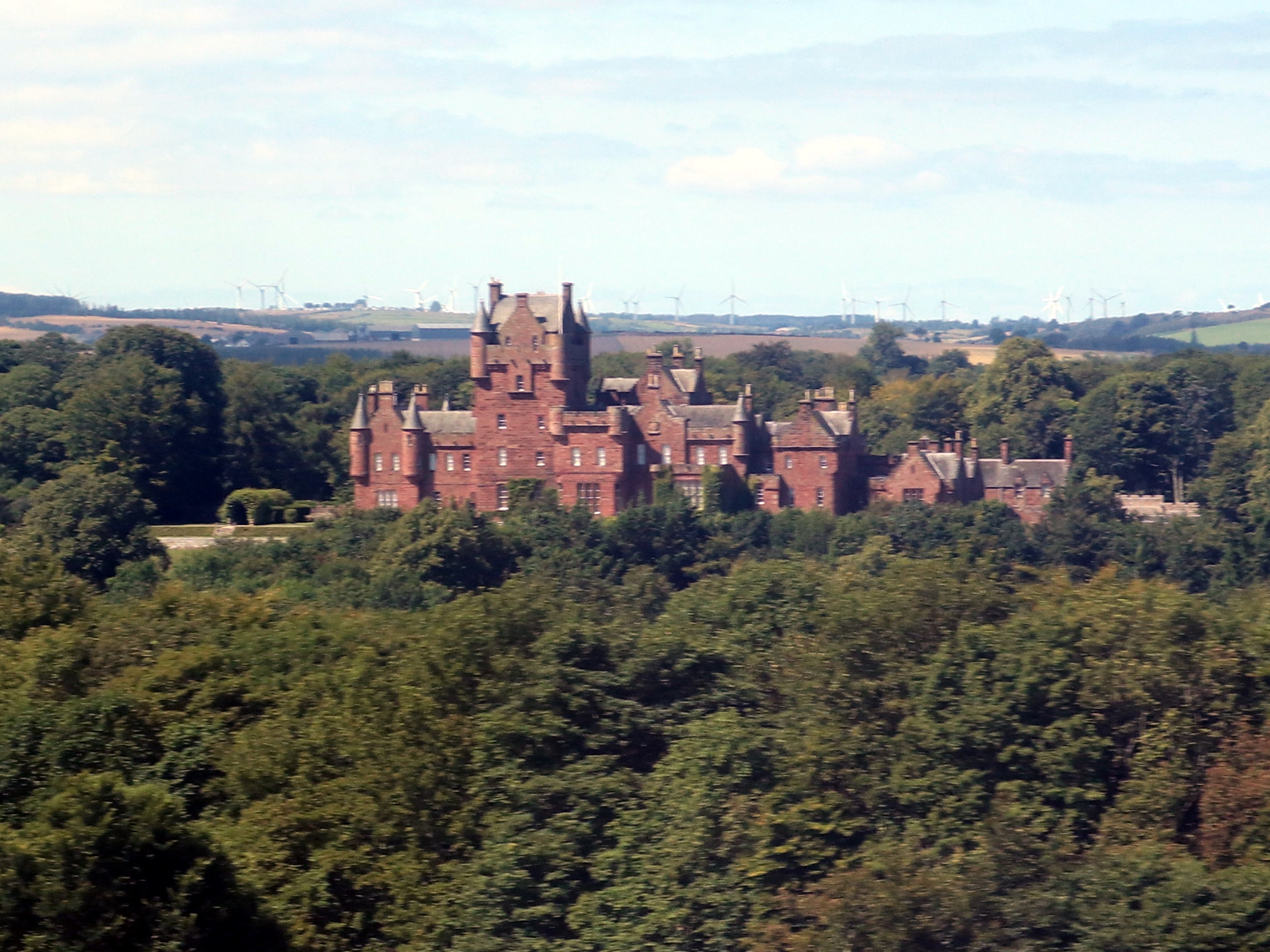
Ayton Castle as seen from a train on the East Coast Main Line

In 1851 William Mitchell-Innes commissioned James Gillespie Graham to build a new castle at Ayton in the Scottish Baronial style in red sandstone. In 1860 architect David Bryce extended the drawing room and added a billiard room, with further additions between 1864 and 1867 by James Maitland Wardrop. Extensive interior redecoration was carried out in 1875 by Bonnar & Carfrae, still largely extant, with stencilled imitation silk damask. In addition to the elaborate offices and stables block, all in red sandstone, Ayton Castle boasts a beehive type 16th-century dovecote, restored in 1745 and 2015, and a magnificent South Lodge in Scots Baronial with archway and screen walls in red sandstone.

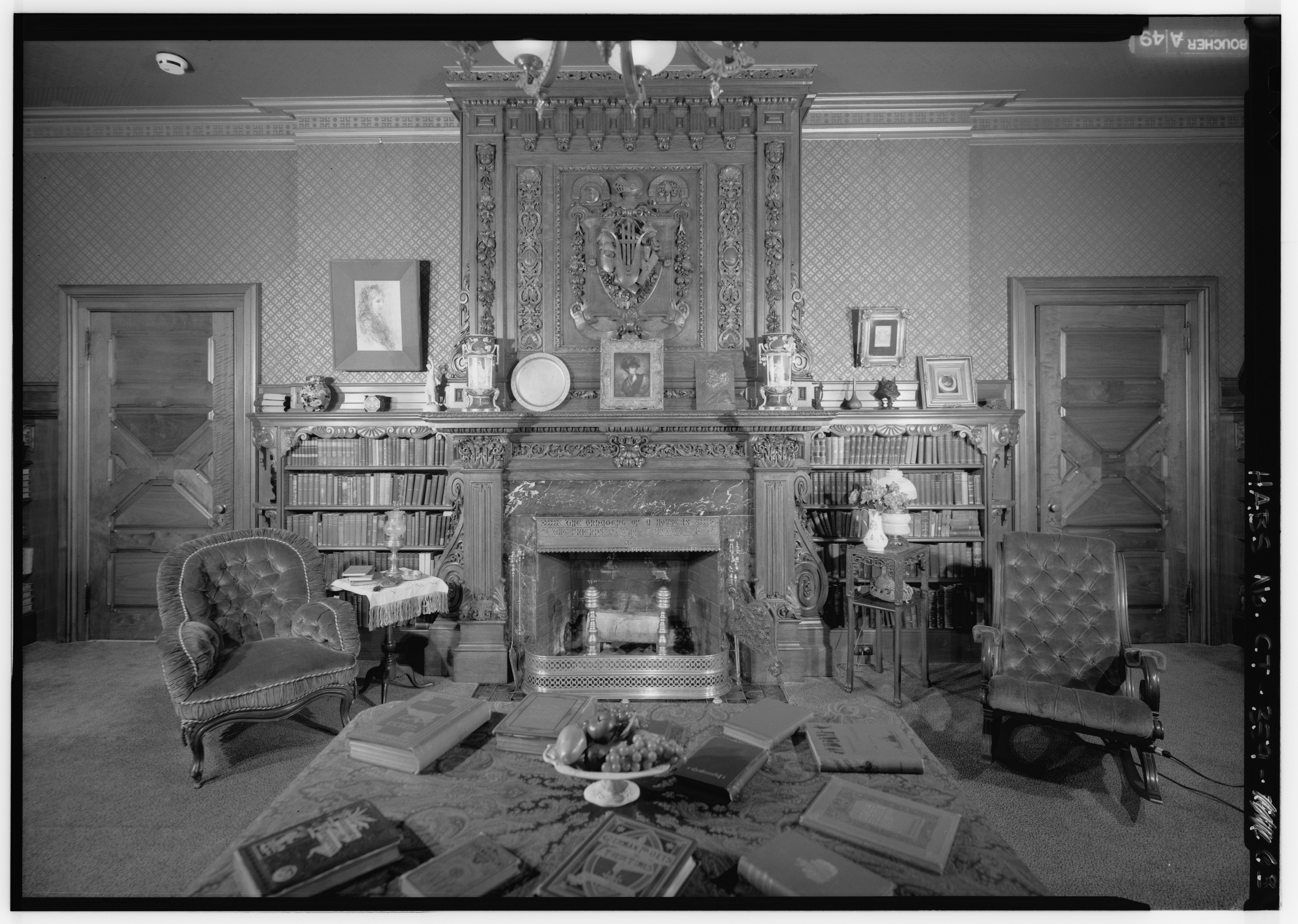
The Mark Twain House library mantel, originally at Ayton Castle

Mark Twain visited the castle in 1873, during which he purchased the dining room fireplace mantel. The mantel is now in the Mark Twain House & Museum in Hartford, Connecticut. The present castle fireplace dates from that occurrence.

Following William Mitchell-Innes's death at the castle in January 1860, it passed to his eldest son and heir, Alexander Mitchell-Innes of Ayton and Whitehall (near Chirnside) (1811–1886), a Deputy Lieutenant and Justice of the Peace for Berwickshire. He continued the family's building works at Ayton by commissioning James Maitland Wardrop to build a new parish church with a 36-metre (118 ft) spire, and stained glass windows by Ballantine & Sons.

Alexander Mitchell-Innes married (1) Charlotte (1818–1848), daughter of Sir Thomas Dick Lauder of Fountainhall, 7th Bt. She died in childbirth having their sixth child. He remarried (2) Fanny Augusta (1821–1902) daughter of James Vine, in Puckaster, Isle of Wight. They had a further nine children. Inevitably there were inheritance disputes. Strangely, Alexander Harold Mitchell-Innes of Ayton & Whitehall was served heir of entail to his grandfather, Alexander Mitchell-Innes of Ayton & Whitehall, on 21 November 1892. In 1895 he sold the barony of Ayton, its castle and lands, for £90,000 to Henry Liddell-Grainger of Middleton Hall, Northumberland (1856–1905). Alexander Mitchell-Innes had apparently shared his entire estate with his very large family and they were accordingly all paid out following the sale of Ayton Castle. The family retained Millbank House and grounds, not far from the castle, as well as Whitehall Manor, near Chirnside, demolished in 2015.

Ayton Castle was the residence of David Liddell-Grainger (1930–2007), a Scottish politician, husband of Anne Abel Smith, a great-great-granddaughter of Queen Victoria, and father of Ian Liddell-Grainger, a Conservative MP (b. 1959). The family sold the castle in 2015.

The castle and most of the pre-existing estate was owned by property developer, Richard Syred, and his partner Brian until 2026.

In February 2026, it was announced that comedian and television personality Alan Carr had purchased the castle, with plans to undertake a full renovation while documenting the project for a new Disney+ series.

== Ayton Castle railway ==
On 24 September 2021 a 500 metres (1,600 ft) 10.25 inches (260 mm) gauge miniature railway was opened in the grounds of the castle. The railway was constructed by Alan Keef Ltd who also supplied the locomotive Lloyd and two passenger carriages.
