= Sujeewa Kamalasuriya =

Sri Lankan cricketer

Personal information
- Full name: Sujeewa Priyantha Kamalasuriya
- Born: 9 May 1965; Colombo, Sri Lanka
- Died: 26 December 2004 (aged 39); Unawatuna, Sri Lanka
- Batting: Left-handed
- Bowling: Right-arm off-break
- Role: Batsman

Domestic team information
- Years: Team
- 1989: Tamil Cricket & Athletic Club

Career statistics
| Competition | First-class |
|---|---|
| Matches | 3 |
| Runs scored | 117 |
| Batting average | 23.40 |
| 100s/50s | 0/1 |
| Top score | 69 |
| Catches/stumpings | 2/0 |
- Source: CricketArchive, 10 October 2022

Sujeewa Priyantha Kamalasuriya (9 May 1965 – 26 December 2004) was a Sri Lankan first-class cricketer who played with the Tamil Union Cricket and Athletic Club.

== Career ==
Kamalasuriya played two 'Youth Tests' for the Sri Lankan Under-19s, led by Aravinda de Silva, when they toured Australia in 1983/84. He was used as an offspinner who batted in the lower order and he took three wickets, including Mark Taylor and Mark Waugh.

His first-class career was brief and consisted of three matches in Group A of the 1988/89 Lakspray Trophy. On his first-class debut against Galle he scored 69 in his first innings and 19 as an opener in his second, dismissed by medium pacer Priyanka de Silva on both occasions. His other matches were against Burgher Recreation Club and Colts Cricket Club. Tamil Union finished the Trophy as runners up to the Sinhalese Sports Club

Instead of continuing in domestic cricket, Kamalasuriya moved to the Australian city of Adelaide where he studied marketing and later opened a cleaning business.

== Death ==
In December 2004, he travelled back to Sri Lanka with his business partner for a holiday and drowned after being struck by the tsunami at Unawatuna, where he was snorkeling.
