= Jonathan Drummond-Webb =

South African surgeon

- Born: 29 August 1959; Johannesburg, South Africa
- Died: 26 December 2004 (aged 45); Little Rock, Arkansas
- Occupation: Pediatric heart surgeon

Jonathan Drummond-Webb (29 August 1959 – 26 December 2004) was a South African pediatric heart surgeon.

He gained national attention by way of a TV series produced by ABC News called ICU: Arkansas Children's Hospital, which showcased complicated operations during the summer of 2002. Late in 2004, he led a team that successfully kept a child alive with a newly developed heart pump until a heart transplant could be performed. The child, Travis Marcus, was able to go home in time for Christmas with a gift and a hug from Drummond-Webb.

Drummond-Webb was born in Johannesburg, South Africa and graduated from the University of the Witwatersrand in 1982. He completed an internship and two residencies there. He and his wife Lorraine De Blanche (also a doctor) came to the U.S. in 1993 so he could do a surgical fellowship at the University of Utah. Two years later, he went on to another fellowship at the Cleveland Clinic. There, he became the surgical director of pediatric cardiac and lung transplantation. In 2001, he was named chief of pediatric and congenital cardiac surgery at the Arkansas Children's Hospital in Little Rock, Arkansas. He held that post at the time of his death.

Hospital spokesman Tom Bonner said the surgeon was a competitive marathoner and triathlete who loved scuba diving. Drummond-Webb also was a champion of Arkansas, appearing in commercials promoting the state to businesses.

Drummond-Webb committed suicide by taking an overdose of oxycodone, a pain medication. His wife found his body with a note. According to the Arkansas Children's Hospital, friends believed he suffered from a sudden bout of depression. His suicide note indicated professional frustration may have been a factor in his death.
