= Ian Liddell-Grainger =

British politician

Major Ian Liddell-Grainger
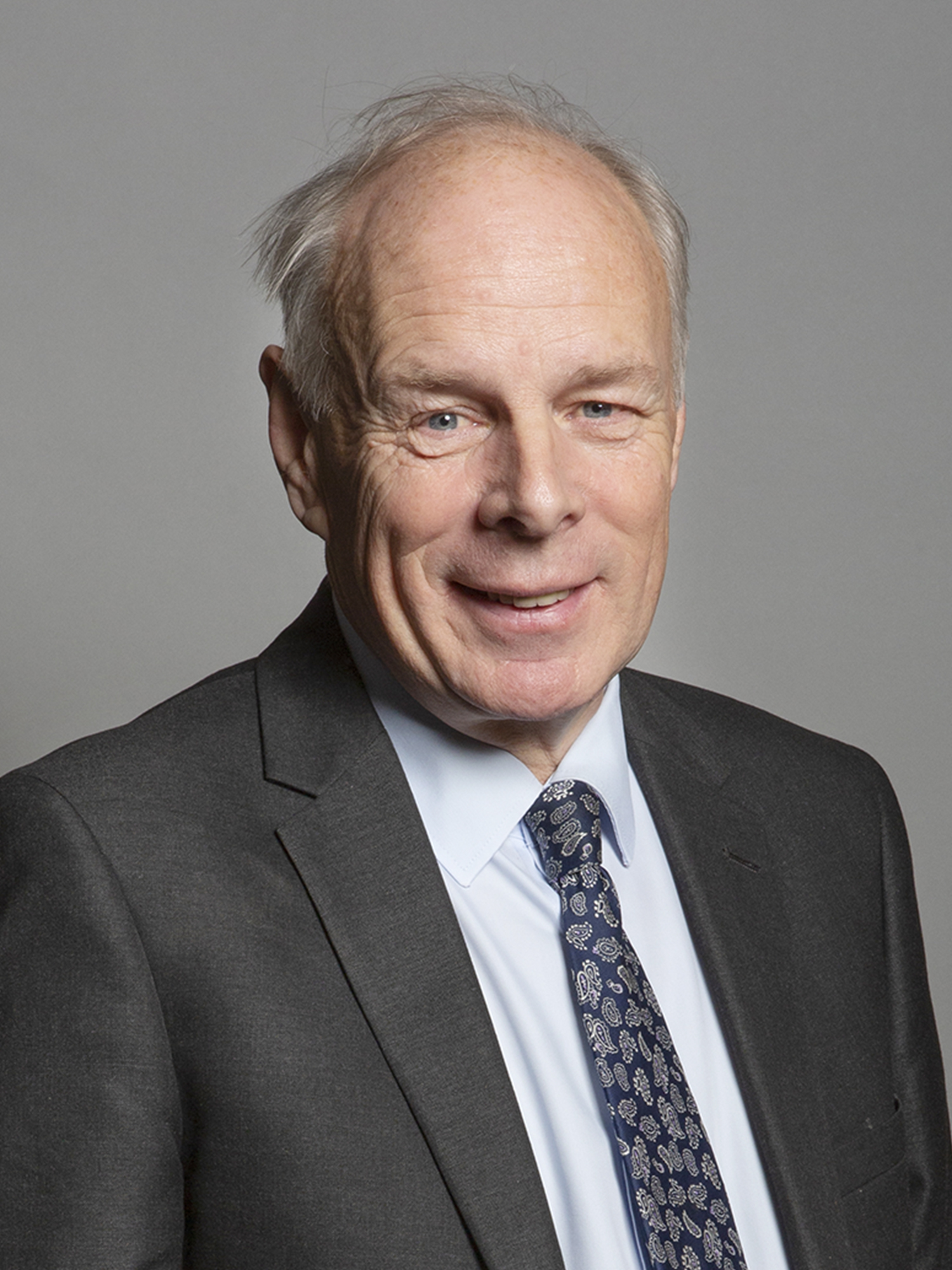
- Liddell-Grainger in 2019

Member of Parliament for Bridgwater and West Somerset Bridgwater (2001–2010)
- In office 7 June 2001 – 30 May 2024
- Preceded by: Tom King
- Succeeded by: Constituency abolished

Personal details
- Born: 23 February 1959 (age 67) Edinburgh, Scotland
- Party: Conservative
- Spouse: Jill Nesbitt (m. 1985)
- Children: 3
- Parent(s): David Liddell-Grainger; Anne Abel Smith
- Education: Millfield School; West of Scotland Agricultural College

Military service
- Allegiance: United Kingdom
- Branch/service: British Army
- Years of service: 1980–1997
- Rank: Major
- Unit: Royal Regiment of Fusiliers

Ian Richard Peregrine Liddell-Grainger (born 23 February 1959) is a British former Conservative Party politician and former property developer. He was MP for Bridgwater from 2001 until 2010, and until 2024, MP for Bridgwater and West Somerset. Through his mother, he is a great-great-great-grandson of Queen Victoria, third cousin of Charles III, fourth cousin of King Willem-Alexander and second cousin once removed of Carl XVI Gustaf of Sweden.

== Early life and career ==
Ian Liddell-Grainger was born on 23 February 1959 in Edinburgh to David Liddell-Grainger and Anne (née Abel Smith), whose mother was Lady May Abel Smith, great-granddaughter of Queen Victoria. The Liddell-Grainger family were landed gentry, of Ayton Castle, Scottish Borders, formerly of Middleton Hall, Middleton, Northumberland.

Liddell-Grainger was privately educated at Wellesley House School in Broadstairs and Millfield School in Somerset, before gaining a National Certificate of Agriculture at the South Scotland Agricultural College in Edinburgh. He ran a 250-acre (1.0 km^{2}) farm in the Scottish Borders from 1980 to 1985 before becoming the managing director of his family's property management and development company.

Commissioned in the Territorial Army, Liddell-Grainger was promoted to major serving with the 6th Battalion of the Royal Regiment of Fusiliers, and commanded the Machine-Gun Platoon and then X Company of the Battalion in Newcastle-upon-Tyne.

== Political career ==
In 1991, he was elected for the Conservative Party as a District Councillor on Tynedale District Council in Northumberland, representing the East Tynedale ward. He served until 1995, when Labour took the seat.

Liddell-Grainger stood as the Conservative candidate in Torridge and West Devon at the 1997 general election, coming second with 38.5% of the vote behind the Liberal Democrat candidate John Burnett.

== Parliamentary career ==
At the 2001 general election, Liddell-Grainger was elected to Parliament as MP for Bridgwater with 40.4% of the vote and a majority of 4,987. He was re-elected as MP for Bridgwater at the 2005 general election with an increased vote share of 44.1% of the vote and an increased majority of 8,469.

In 2006, Liddell-Grainger was disqualified from the WriteToThem league table after faking e-mails and replies to himself to improve his "responsiveness rating" on a website which helps people contact their elected representatives. Liddell-Grainger's spokesman commented that the e-mails had been sent to test the data that the website was judging him on.

Prior to the 2010 general election, Liddell-Grainger's constituency of Bridgwater was abolished and replaced with Bridgwater and West Somerset. Liddell-Grainger was elected at the 2010 general election as MP for Bridgwater and West Somerset with 45.3% of the vote and a majority of 9,249.

At the 2010 general election, Liddell-Grainger declined to attend any election hustings or to take part in the BBC's election coverage. A Facebook group was set up asking "Where's Ian Liddell-Grainger?" Liddell-Grainger said that he was busy canvassing and dealing with casework.

The cancellation of plans to build new school buildings in Bridgwater in 2010 led Liddell-Grainger to threaten to "march" on Downing Street in protest. The cancellation of the Building Schools for the Future projects was one of the first acts by the newly elected coalition government's Minister for Education Michael Gove. Liddell-Grainger claimed that Bridgwater's schools were in need of rebuilding and that the plans, which had cancelled projects in three of the town's six schools, were actually all under one project heading and had been working effectively. Gove was forced to apologise for a number of errors in the cancellation of the project nationally and the Bridgwater project was reconsidered by the government after Liddell-Grainger met Gove and it became apparent that Gove "wasn't aware of all the facts to do with the Bridgwater scheme".

In 2010, Liddell-Grainger criticised plans by the Environment Agency and Natural England to create a wetland habitat at Steart on the Severn estuary as part of a realignment of coastal flood defences. The project, which he said the nation "should not and must not afford", went ahead in 2012.

Liddell-Grainger voiced opposition to wind power schemes in his constituency, including plans to build two wind turbines at Wiveliscombe in 2012. In March 2013 he supported the decision to allow planning permission to build a third nuclear power station at Hinkley Point.

At the 2015 general election, Liddell-Grainger was re-elected as MP for Bridgwater and West Somerset with an increased vote share of 46% and an increased majority of 14,583.

Liddell-Grainger was a member of the 18-strong British delegation to the Parliamentary Assembly of the Council of Europe, and headed one of the five political groups in the Assembly, the European Conservatives Group. He supported Brexit in the 2016 referendum.

At the snap 2017 general election, Liddell-Grainger was again re-elected with an increased vote share of 55.1% and an increased majority of 15,448.

In June 2018, he was accused of trivialising suicide by political rivals after shouting out that representatives of the SNP should consider 'suicide' after the SNP's Westminster leader, Ian Blackford, asked John Bercow, the sitting speaker, a question about Scotland's future following Brexit. He later defended his comments, stating he was referring to 'political suicide'.

Liddell-Grainger chaired the All-Party Parliamentary Group on Energy Studies, Nuclear Energy, the All-Party Pharmaceuticals group, the All-Party Dyslexia group, and the All-Party Tax group, and is also a member of the All Parliamentary Armed Forces Scheme with the Royal Air Force and the all Parliamentary Radio Group. He also sits on the Business, Energy and Industrial Strategy Committee and has previously sat on the Public Administration Committee, the Environmental Audit Committee, the DEFRA select committee, the Statutory Instruments (Select/Joint Committees), the Scottish Committee as well as the Crossrail Bill Committee.

At the 2019 general election, Liddell-Grainger was again re-elected with an increased vote share of 62.1% and an increased majority of 24,439.

In the 2024 general election, he contested Tiverton and Minehead but was defeated by Liberal Democrat Rachel Gilmour.

== Political positions ==
Liddell-Grainger was a member of the socially conservative Cornerstone Group, a ginger group within the Conservative Party. His interests included the economy, taxation, treatment for dyslexia, constitutional affairs and rural matters; he has also spoken in favour of making Herceptin available for early-stage breast cancer sufferers.

The Hinkley Point nuclear power stations are located in Liddell-Grainger's former constituency. He believed that "the nuclear power industry has truly embraced the energy future of our country", and that "nuclear energy plays an important role in my constituency and is behind the creation of numerous jobs and training opportunities".

Liddell-Grainger was the chairman of the European Conservatives Group and Democratic Alliance grouping in the Council of Europe and was reported to have pushed for the merger of the European Conservatives with the Democratic Alliance, which includes a number of parties described as "far-right", such as Alternative for Germany and Italy's Northern League, together with Brothers of Italy, the Freedom Party of Austria and the Sweden Democrats.

== Controversies ==
Liddell-Grainger was accused of abusive and bullying behaviour towards local councillors and council staff within his constituency. In 2010, he was reprimanded by the Conservative Party Leader and Chief Whip over his behaviour towards the former Chief Executive of Somerset County Council, whilst in 2015 the majority of Conservative West Somerset councillors backed calls for him to be de-selected for "divisive" and "unsupportive" behaviour. In March 2015, West Somerset Council leader Tim Taylor compiled a dossier of complaints, which was sent to the Conservative Party chairman and chief whip. Taylor described Liddell-Grainger as a "disgrace to the Conservative Party". Despite this, Liddell-Grainger was re-selected for the following general election by the Conservative Association of Bridgwater and West Somerset.

In February 2014, in the context of flooding on the Somerset Levels, Liddell-Grainger called the chairman of the Environment Agency, Baron Smith of Finsbury a "little git", and a "coward" and said he would like to "stick his head down the loo and flush". The floods took place after exceptionally bad weather. Liddell-Grainger placed the blame for the floods on the Environment Agency's policy of not dredging the local rivers, and said that he would be consulting with Dutch hydrological experts. The Chartered Institution of Water and Environmental Management said increased dredging would not have prevented the flooding in the Somerset Levels – due to the sheer amount of water.

In September 2015, Liddell-Grainger criticised the Conservative run Somerset County Council for cutting services and carrying out wasteful reorganisations. The Leader of the Council responded that the MP's comments were 'ignorant and lacked understanding', that the MP had refused to meet him to discuss the subject and that Government funding cuts were to blame for cuts to services.

In December 2016, he failed to renew his firearms licence on time for the shooting season. He had previously criticised young voters who had been unable to register to vote in the EU referendum because the government website crashed on the last day of registration, saying they should 'pay the price for their own tardiness'. Liddell-Grainger blamed the police for his licence delay, criticising their "utter incompetence". Following the incident, the satirical magazine Private Eye published an article that asked if the actions of the MP, coupled with his continued electoral success, meant that he was 'Somerset's answer to Donald Trump'.

== Expenses ==
Liddell-Grainger employed his wife as his Parliamentary Assistant on a salary up to £35,000. The practice of MPs employing family members was criticised by some sections of the media on the lines that it promotes nepotism. Although MPs who were first elected in 2017 have been banned from employing family members, the restriction is not retrospective – meaning that Liddell-Grainger's employment of his wife is lawful. In 2010, he had included both his wife and his two eldest children on his list of staff, the only MP to do so at the time in the country.

Liddell-Grainger claimed a total of £166,109 in expenses, including for office, staffing and travelling costs, during 2007–8. In December 2009, he faced criticism for claiming expenses for a cleaner for his second home in London and for claiming £375-a-month on expenses for food. He responded that the figures were reasonable and proportionate. Later that month it was reported that he had been asked to pay back £3,200 of expenses payments he had claimed incorrectly. Under revised regulations, during 2010–11 he claimed the reduced sum of £147,004 for expenses, the sixth highest of all MPs in that year.

== Post-parliamentary career ==
Following his defeat at the 2024 UK General Election, Liddell-Grainger was appointed as Chairman for public affairs consultancy Sovereign Strategy.

== Personal life ==
Liddell-Grainger married Jill Nesbitt in 1985; she was his parliamentary secretary. The couple have three children.

In 2011, his family seat of Ayton Castle and its Scottish feudal barony of Ayton, Berwickshire was sold.

Parliament of the United Kingdom
Preceded by Tom King	Member of Parliament for Bridgwater; 2001–2024	Succeeded by Ashley Fox
Lines of succession
Preceded by Anne Abel Smith	Line of succession to the British throne descendant of Prince Leopold, son of Queen Victoria	Succeeded by Peter Liddell-Grainger
