= Vern McKee =

American football and baseball player and coach

Biographical details
- Born: April 28, 1930; Browns Valley, Minnesota, U.S.
- Died: December 10, 2004 (aged 74); Sioux Falls, South Dakota, U.S.
- Education: Huron (1956)

Playing career

Baseball
- 1952: Independence Browns
- 1953: Topeka Owls
- 1953: Fort Smith Twins

Coaching career (HC unless noted)

Football
- 1956–1959: Ipswich HS (SD)
- 1960–1962: Yankton
- 1963–1964: North Dakota State (assistant)
- 1965–1966: South Dakota (assistant)
- 1967–1969: Huron HS (SD)
- 1992–1993: Huron

Basketball
- 1960–?: Yankton
- 1965–1967: South Dakota (assistant)

Baseball
- 1961–1963: Yankton
- 1964–1965: North Dakota State
- 1966: South Dakota

Administrative career (AD unless noted)
- 1987–1988: Dakota Wesleyan

Head coaching record
- Overall: 13–30–1 (college football); 21–26 (college baseball, North Dakota State only)

Vern Albert McKee (April 28, 1930 – December 10, 2004) was an American football and baseball player and coach. He spent two seasons playing Minor League Baseball the St. Louis Browns organization before embarking on a career in coaching and scouting. McKee served as the head football coach at Yankton College from 1960 to 1962 and Huron University from 1992 to 1993, compiling a career college football coaching record of 13–30–1. He was also the head baseball coach at North Dakota State University from 1964 to 1965, tallying a mark of 21–26. From 1987 to 1988, he was the athletic director at Dakota Wesleyan University.

== Head coaching record ==
=== College football ===
Year	Team	Overall	Conference	Standing	Bowl/playoffs
Yankton Greyhounds (Tri-State Conference) (1960–1962)
1960	Yankton	1–7	1–5	6th	
1961	Yankton	5–4	2–4	T–5th	
1962	Yankton	3–6	2–4	5th	
Yankton:		9–17	5–13		
Huron Tribe (South Dakota Intercollegiate Conference) (1992–1993)
1992	Huron	3–6	2–3	T–3rd	
1993	Huron	1–7–1	1–4	5th	
Huron:		4–13–1	3–7		
Total:		13–30–1			
