= Herbert Jäger =

German footballer

Personal information
- Date of birth: 15 February 1926
- Place of birth: Wuppertal, Germany
- Date of death: 10 December 2004 (aged 78)
- Place of death: Wuppertal, Germany
- Height: 1.85 m (6 ft 1 in)
- Position: Defender

Senior career*
Years	Team	Apps	(Gls)
1949–1952	Cronenberger SC		
1952–1957	Fortuna Düsseldorf	74	(1)
1957–1961	VfL Benrath		
Total		74	(1)

International career
1952	West Germany Olympic	4	(0)
- * Club domestic league appearances and goals

Herbert Jäger (15 February 1926 – 10 December 2004) was a German footballer who competed in the 1952 Summer Olympics.
