= Marian Masłoń =

Polish footballer

Personal information
- Full name: Marian Lucjan Masłoń
- Date of birth: 11 February 1930
- Place of birth: Sosnowiec, Poland
- Date of death: 11 December 2004 (aged 74)
- Place of death: Sosnowiec, Poland
- Position: Defender

Youth career
- 1945–1949: RKU Sosnowiec

Senior career*
| Years | Team | Apps | (Gls) |
| 1949–1950 | Stal Sosnowiec | | |
| 1951–1952 | OWKS Kraków | | |
| 1953–1959 | Stal Sosnowiec | | |

International career
| 1956 | Poland | 2 | (0) |
- * Club domestic league appearances and goals

Marian Lucjan Masłoń (11 February 1930 – 11 December 2004) was a Polish footballer who played as a defender.

He earned two caps for the Poland national team in 1956.

== Honours ==
Stal Sosnowiec

- II liga: 1954, 1959 (North)
