= David Liddell-Grainger =

Scottish politician

David Ian Liddell-Grainger KStJ FSAScot (26 January 1930 – 12 March 2007) of Ayton Castle, in Berwickshire, was a prominent freemason who served as Grand Master Mason of the Grand Lodge of Scotland from 1969 until 1974. In 1955 he was created an Officer of St John of Jerusalem and in 1974 a Knight of St John of Jerusalem and served in the Royal Company of Archers between 1955 and 1983. He was a member of Berwickshire County Council from 1958 to 1973 and was a Deputy Lieutenant of Berwickshire between 1963 and 1985. Much of his family's wealth derived from his great-great grandfather Richard Grainger (1797-1861) “visionary and builder” the creator of much of the present centre of the City of Newcastle, “the prime mover behind one of the most significant exercises in urban planning in the middle decades of the 19th century and a builder and speculator unparalleled in the region”. He married Anne Mary Sibylla Abel Smith, a descendant of Queen Victoria and third cousin of Queen Elizabeth II. Among their children was Ian Liddell-Grainger, who became a Conservative Party Member of Parliament (MP).

== Biography ==
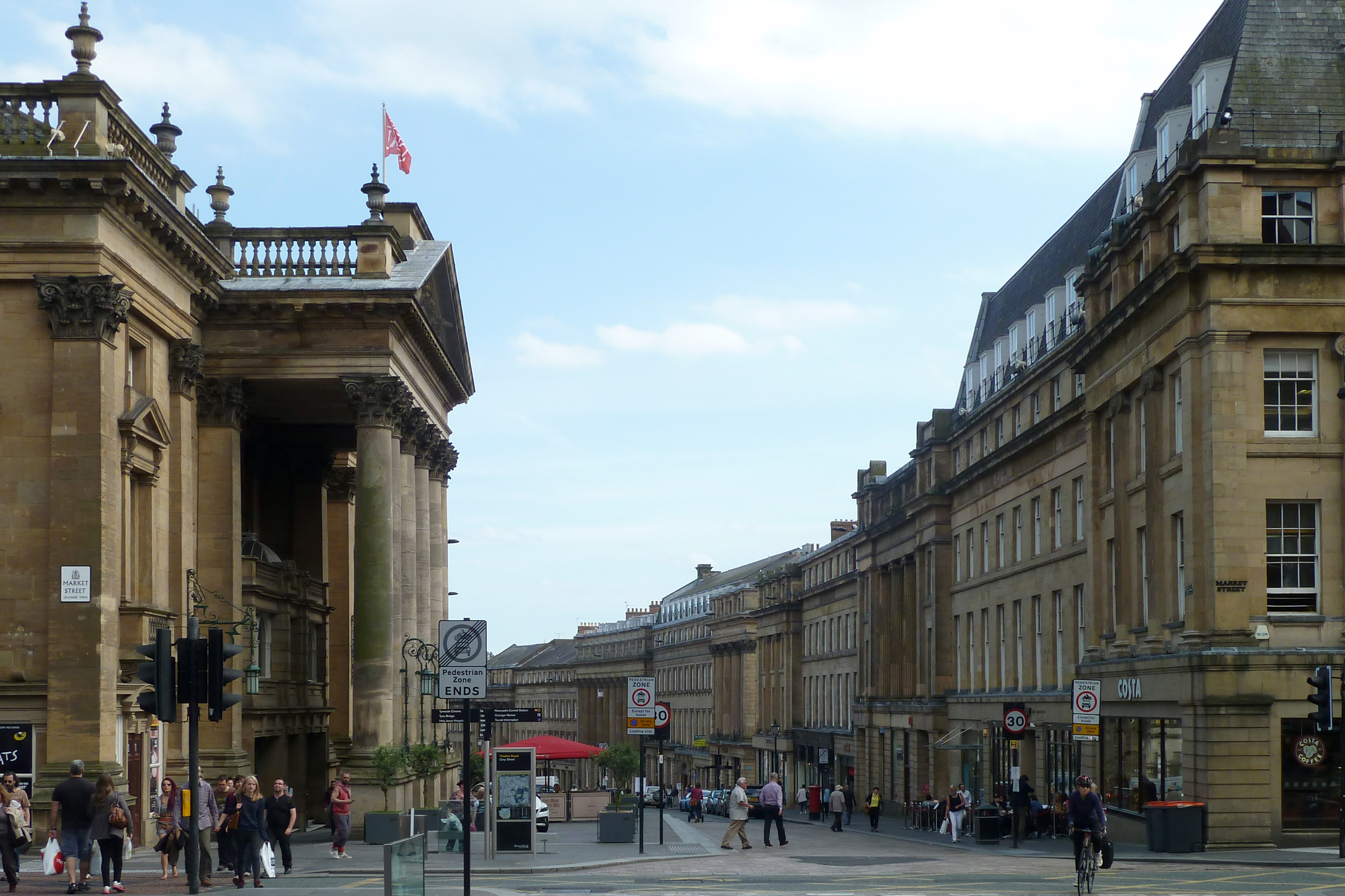
Grey Street Newcastle-upon-Tyne, part of the Grainger Town estate developed by Richard Grainger (1797-1861) “visionary and builder”, an ancestor of David Liddell-Grainger and founder of much of the Liddell-Grainger family fortune

David Liddell-Grainger was the son of Captain Henry Hubert Liddell-Grainger (1886–1935), Scots Guards, JP, DL, of Ayton Castle, by his wife Lady Muriel Felicia Vere Bertie, daughter and only child and heiress of Montague Bertie, 12th Earl of Lindsey, who married secondly, in 1938, Sir Malcolm Barclay-Harvey, a soldier, Member of Parliament, Governor of South Australia from 1939 to 1944, Prior for Scotland of the Order of St John from 1964, and a prominent freemason who served as Grand Master of the Grand Lodge of South Australia, 1941–44 and later as Grand Master Mason of the Grand Lodge of Scotland 1949–1953. In 1924 Barclay-Harvey had inherited from his father Dinnet House in Aberdeenshire, with its 14,000-acre (5,666 ha) estate.

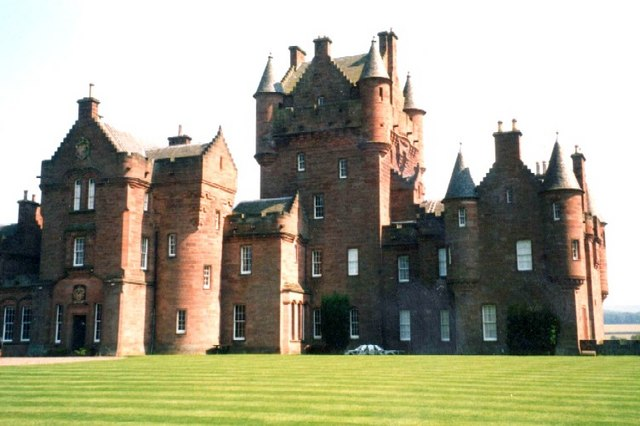
Ayton Castle, in Berwickshire, built in 1851 and purchased in 1894/5 by Henry Liddell Grainger (1856/9–1905)

David Liddell-Grainger's father died in 1935 when he was aged 5, and his mother remarried three years later in 1938 to Sir Malcolm Barclay-Harvey, Governor of South Australia from 1939 to 1944, and a prominent Freemason who served as Grand Master of South Australia, (1941 – 44) and later as Grand Master Mason of the Grand Lodge of Scotland 1949–1953. David thus accompanied his step-father to Australia, where he attended St Peter's College, Adelaide. He then continued his education in England, where he attended Eton College and later the University of London.

== Career ==
Following in the footsteps of his step-father, David became a Freemason and was initiated into Scottish Freemasonry in The Lodge of Ayton Castle, No.1423, and served as Master of that Lodge 1960-1961. He was a Founder Member of Lodge Sir Robert Moray, No.1641, (Edinburgh, Scotland) and also a Founder Member of Lodge Fleur de Lys, No.1722, (Airdrie, North Lanarkshire). He was elected a member of the Grand Committee of the Grand Lodge of Antient Free and Accepted Masons of Scotland in 1962, and served as Grand Master Mason of the Grand Lodge of Scotland from 1969 until 1974, the head of Scottish freemasonry, a position occupied by his step-father 16 years earlier, from 1949 to 1953.

His step-father served as Prior for Scotland of the Order of St John from 1964, and in 1955 David was created an Officer of St John of Jerusalem and in 1974 a Knight of St John of Jerusalem. Between 1955 and 1883 he served in the Royal Company of Archers, The Queen's Bodyguard for Scotland, a ceremonial unit which serves as the Sovereign's bodyguard in Scotland, of which his step-father was also a member.

== First marriage and issue ==
On 14 December 1957, he married Anne Mary Sibylla Abel Smith, a third cousin of Queen Elizabeth II, being a daughter of Colonel Sir Henry Abel Smith, Governor of Queensland, Australia (1958–66), by his wife née "Princess May of Teck" who on her mother's side was a great-granddaughter of Queen Victoria and on her father's side was a great-great-granddaughter of King George III (grandfather of Queen Victoria) and the niece of Queen Mary (née Princess Mary of Teck), wife of King George V and mother of two kings. The marriage took place in St. George's Chapel, Windsor Castle, at which Queen Elizabeth II and other members of the Royal Family were present. The couple had five children:

- Ian Richard Peregrine Liddell-Grainger (born 23 February 1959), a former Conservative Party politician
- Charles Montagu Liddell-Grainger (born 23 July 1960)
- Simon Rupert Liddell-Grainger (born 28 December 1962)
- Alice Mary Liddell-Grainger (born 3 March 1965)
- Malcolm Henry Liddell-Grainger (born 14 December 1967)

== Second marriage and issue ==
Liddell-Grainger conducted an affair in the 1970s, which was public knowledge, with Lady de la Rue (née Christine Schellin), the young wife of his elderly near neighbour Sir Eric de la Rue, 3rd Baronet (1906–1989). As a result, Liddell-Grainger and his first wife, Anne Abel Smith, were divorced in 1981. Christine de la Rue then moved into the Liddell-Grainger family home, Ayton Castle, and bore Liddell-Grainger two children, (David) Henry Liddell-Grainger (born 31 January 1983) and Maximilian Liddell-Grainger (born 1985; died 1998). He later married Christine on 18 October 1996. Despite this, when Christine's first husband, Sir Eric de la Rue, became terminally ill, he was moved into Ayton Castle, where he stayed until his death.

== Death and legacy ==
When Liddell-Grainger died in 2007, Ayton Castle and its 6,000-acre (2,428-hectare) estate was left to the surviving son of his second marriage, not to the children of his first marriage. Christine had her second husband buried in the grounds of Ayton Castle, near the graves of their second son who had died from cancer aged 13 in 1999, and of a stillborn baby called James. On deciding to sell the Castle, it was felt that the presence of the graves would not be conducive to buyers, so in 2012 Christine sought permission from Duns Sheriff Court to exhume them and rebury them within Ayton village. In July 2015 the Castle was sold although elements of the estate have been retained by the Liddell-Grainger family.

Masonic offices
Preceded by Ronald Orr-Ewing	Grand Master of the Grand Lodge of Scotland; 1969–1974	Succeeded by Robert Wolrige Gordon
