= Kristina Fröjmark =

Swedish reality show contestant

Kristina Maria Fröjmark (1957–2004) was a Swedish reality show contestant after her appearance in the show Farmen-Skärgården, where she was one of the twelve contestants who ran a farm in Stockholm archipelago; the reality show was broadcast on TV4. Fröjmark got a lot of attention in Swedish media for her jet set life and wealth and on the show, she would speak much of her life as a stay-at-home wife.

== Death ==
Fröjmark, her husband Björn and their two children drowned on 26 December 2004 during the 2004 Indian Ocean earthquake and tsunami while on vacation in Khao Lak, Thailand. The last sign of them was a short message sent the day before.
