= Little Ilford School =

School in East London

Location
- Rectory Road; London, E12 6JB; England; 51°32′50″N 0°03′29″E

Information
- Type: Community school
- Motto: Courage, Commitment, Compassion
- Established: 1957
- Local authority: London Borough of Newham
- Department for Education URN: 102776 Tables
- Ofsted: Reports
- Head teacher: Jenny Evans
- Staff: 250
- Gender: Coeducational
- Age: 11 to 16
- Enrolment: Capacity = 1,800 Enrolment = 1,700
- Website: https://www.littleilford.newham.sch.uk/

Little Ilford School is a coeducational 11-16 secondary school located in Little Ilford within the London Borough of Newham in East London, United Kingdom. Established in 1957, the school accommodates approximately 1,700 students with a building capacity of 1,800. The school has been described by Ofsted as 'Good' in their last inspection in 2022. The school maintains a strong academic emphasis on the EBacc, with a student entry rate substantially above the national average. Department for Education performance data indicates above-average student progress scores (Progress 8) alongside a consistently positive Attainment 8 score above national averages. Unlike most secondary schools in the borough, Little Ilford School is not an academy. It is one of just two secondary schools still run directly by Newham Council.

== Construction of new building ==
In 2014, it was announced that Little Ilford School would be part of the Priority School Building Programme (PSBP), a government scheme to rebuild or refurbish school buildings in the worst condition, after its original building was deemed not fit for purpose. Under the programme, the school started the construction of a new £22.8m four-storey building, designed by CPMG with the construction contract being awarded to Wates. The demolition of the original school building was executed at the new building's completion and all students and staff moved to the new facility in 2016.

== School Expansion (2019-2023) ==
In 2019, Newham Council proposed expanding Little Ilford School from 10 forms of entry to 12 to address an anticipated shortfall in local secondary school places, increasing overall student capacity from 1,500 students to 1,800. The £13.1m proposal met initial resistance from school staff and union members who expressed concerns over space constraints and educational quality, leading to industrial action organised by the National Educational Union (NEU) in late 2020.

Despite the initial opposition, the expansion proceeded and was completed in spring 2023. Designed by Rivington Street Studio and constructed by Lengard and M-AR using a combination of modular off-site construction and portalised steel framing, the project delivered several major infrastructure improvements, such as: A new main Entrance & Reception, a purpose-built entrance pavilion on Rectory Road providing a secure new school reception and visitor access point. The introduction of "C Block" - a new three-storey humanities teaching building. A dedicated Special Educational Needs and Disabilities (SEND) facility designed for low-distracted learning. Upgrades to external social spaces, pathways, and green areas surrounding the new facilities. The expansion project was shortlisted for Project of the Year at the 2024 MMC Awards.

== Curriculum and special educational needs ==
As a community secondary school maintained by Newham Council, Little Ilford School follows the National Curriculum for England across Key Stages 3 and 4, offering a broad range of GCSE and vocational qualifications. The school places a strong emphasis on traditional academic subjects within the English Baccalaureate (EBacc)—including English, mathematics, the sciences, history or geography, and modern foreign languages—entering a significantly higher proportion of its cohort for the full EBacc suite than both local and national averages.

Alongside mainstream classes, the school hosts a specialist Autistic Spectrum Disorder (ASD) resourced provision funded by Newham Council. This unit supports up to 25 students with an Education, Health and Care Plan (EHCP), combining tailored small-group and sensory support in the dedicated SEND building with structured integration into mainstream lessons.

== Ofsted inspections and academic performance ==
Little Ilford School received back-to-back "Outstanding" ratings from Ofsted following inspections in 2009 and 2012. At its subsequent full inspection in November 2022, Ofsted judged the school to be "Good" overall, awarding "Good" ratings across all four inspection categories: quality of education, behaviour and attitudes, personal development, and leadership and management. Inspectors highlighted the school's ambitious curriculum, high expectations for pupil conduct, and strong personal development programme.

According to Department for Education (DfE) performance tables, the school's GCSE outcomes consistently exceed national averages for state-funded schools in England. Its Progress 8 score has remained well above the national benchmark, reflecting strong value-added academic progress from Key Stage 2 to Key Stage 4, while its Attainment 8 score and the percentage of students achieving grade 5 or above in both English and mathematics also outperform national averages.

== Notable former pupils ==
- Bobby Zamora, footballer

== Notable former pupils ==
- Bobby Zamora, footballer
