= Curt Christensen =

Danish footballer (1920-2004)

Personal information
- Date of birth: 12 March 1920
- Place of birth: Esbjerg, Denmark
- Date of death: 14 December 2004 (aged 84)
- Position: Midfielder

International career
| Years | Team | Apps | (Gls) |
| 1949 | Denmark | 1 | (0) |

Curt Christensen (12 March 1920 – 14 December 2004) was a Danish footballer. He played in one match for the Denmark national football team in 1949.
