= Wave (Deraniyagala book) =

2013 book by Sonali Deraniyagala

- The cover of the book
- Author: Sonali Deraniyagala
- Language: English
- Subject: 2004 Indian Ocean earthquake and tsunami
- Genre: Memoir
- Published: Alfred A. Knopf
- Publication place: Sri Lanka
- Media type: Print
- Pages: 240
- ISBN: 9780345804310

Wave: Life and Memories after the Tsunami is a memoir by the Sri Lankan educator Sonali Deraniyagala about the 2004 Indian Ocean earthquake and tsunami. It was first published in 2013 by Alfred A. Knopf. The book recounts the story of Deraniyagala's life before the tsunami struck the coast, and how it changed dramatically after the disaster, primarily focusing on life without her five most important family members, including her parents, her husband, and her two sons. It is written in the first-person narrative style and opens on December 26, 2004. The book received several awards and positive reviews from critics.

== Storyline ==
The book starts with Deraniyagala at a beach-side hotel on the Sri Lankan coast with her family. She gives the first hint at the impending disaster in the second line of the book, "The ocean looked a little closer to our hotel than usual". Deraniyagala describes how, within minutes, things changed before her eyes, and her family was lost when they were washed away somewhere "far away". She frequently writes frankly about her loss throughout the book. Deraniyagala is nostalgic of days before the tidal wave. She yearns for those days to be back, but fate does not allow it. Critics have called it a book with a lot of grief.

A number of years after the disaster, Deraniyagala lives in her husband's flat in London, and she is suicidal. She writes that "an army of family and friends" watched over her, day and night. She wishes to forget her haunted memories of the day, but is unable to do so.

== Reception ==
In a review for The New York Times, Cheryl Strayed, wrote "I didn't feel as if I was going to cry while reading Wave. I felt as if my heart might stop." Barnes & Noble described the book as "poignant, yet spare and unsentimental". Marcia Kaye, an author and journalist, in her review for the Colombo Telegraph wrote,

"Wave is somehow both jaggedly raw and beautifully crafted at the same time. Above all, it speaks to the power of the human spirit to survive, to love, to remember. It reminds us that these often mundane lives of ours and our families' must be cherished, because we never know when an extraordinary event may come along to change it all."

The New York Times rated it as one of the top ten best books of 2013. It was an "Amazon Best Book of the Month (March 2013)". Donna Seaman from Booklist called the story "indelible and unique". The Christian Science Monitor ranked it number 14 in "15 best nonfiction books of 2013". Therese Purcell Nielsen and Erin Shea of Library Journal rated it one of 11 best memoirs of 2013. Kirkus Reviews called it one of the "Best Books of 2013 for Vicarious Experiences You'll Never Forget", one of the lists of "Best Books of 2013 (Nonfiction)".
