= Richard Abel Smith =

British army officer

Colonel Richard Abel Smith DL
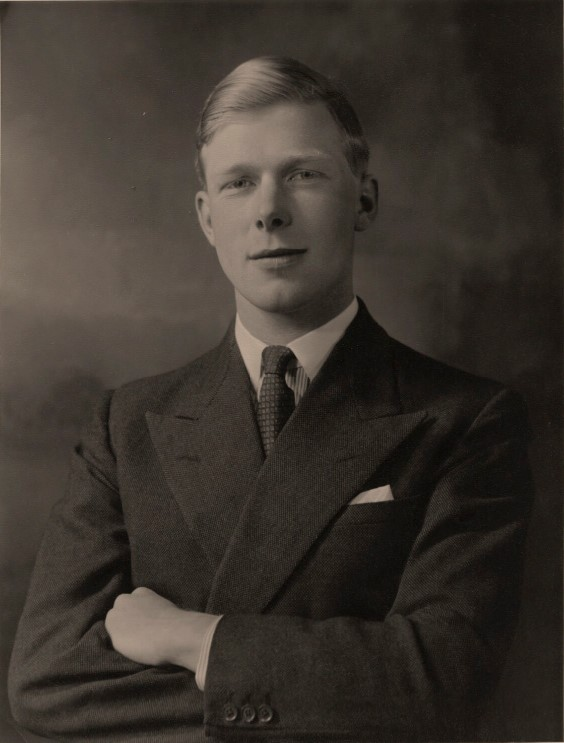
- Born: 11 October 1933; Kensington Palace, London, England
- Died: 23 December 2004 (aged 71); Blidworth Dale, Nottinghamshire, England
- Education: Royal Military Academy Sandhurst; Royal Agricultural College
- Occupation: British Army officer
- Spouse: Marcia Kendrew (m. 1960)
- Children: 1
- Parents: Sir Henry Abel Smith; Lady May Cambridge

Colonel Richard Francis Abel Smith DL (11 October 1933 – 23 December 2004) was a British Army officer.

== Early life ==
He was the son of Colonel Henry Abel Smith and his wife Lady May Cambridge, née Princess May of Teck, a great-granddaughter of Queen Victoria and a niece of Queen Mary. He was born at Kensington Palace in London, England. Richard was the second of three children and the only boy. He was a great-great-grandson of Queen Victoria.

Abel Smith was educated at Eton College, the Royal Military Academy Sandhurst, and the Royal Agricultural College.

== Career ==
He was commissioned into the Royal Horse Guards (The Blues). He was Aide-de-Camp to the Governor of Cyprus between 1957 and 1960. He was a military instructor between 1960 and 1963 at Sandhurst. He commanded the Sherwood Rangers Yeomanry squadron of the Royal Yeomanry between 1967 and 1969. He held the office of Deputy Lieutenant (D.L.) of Nottinghamshire between 1970 and 1991 and High Sheriff of Nottinghamshire in 1978. He gained the rank of Honorary Colonel in 1979 in the service of the Sherwood Rangers Yeomanry Regiment, which he held until 1989. He held the office of Vice Lord Lieutenant of Nottinghamshire between 1991 and 1999.

== Personal life ==
On 28 April 1960, Smith married Marcia Kendrew, a daughter of Sir Douglas Kendrew, a future Governor of Western Australia, in St. Mary Abbott's Church, Kensington, London, England. Prince Henry, Duke of Gloucester, the Princess Alice, Duchess of Gloucester and Mary, Princess Royal and Countess of Harewood, all attended the wedding. Consent for the marriage was required under the Royal Marriages Act 1772. They had a daughter, Katherine Emma Abel Smith (born 11 March 1961), who married Hon. Hubert Wentworth Beaumont, son of the life peer and Green Party activist Timothy Wentworth Beaumont, Baron Beaumont of Whitley, a descendant of Wentworth Canning Beaumont, 1st Viscount Allendale. He died of a stroke at home in Blidworth Dale, Nottinghamshire, England on 23 December 2004.
