= Kate Brauman =

American scientist

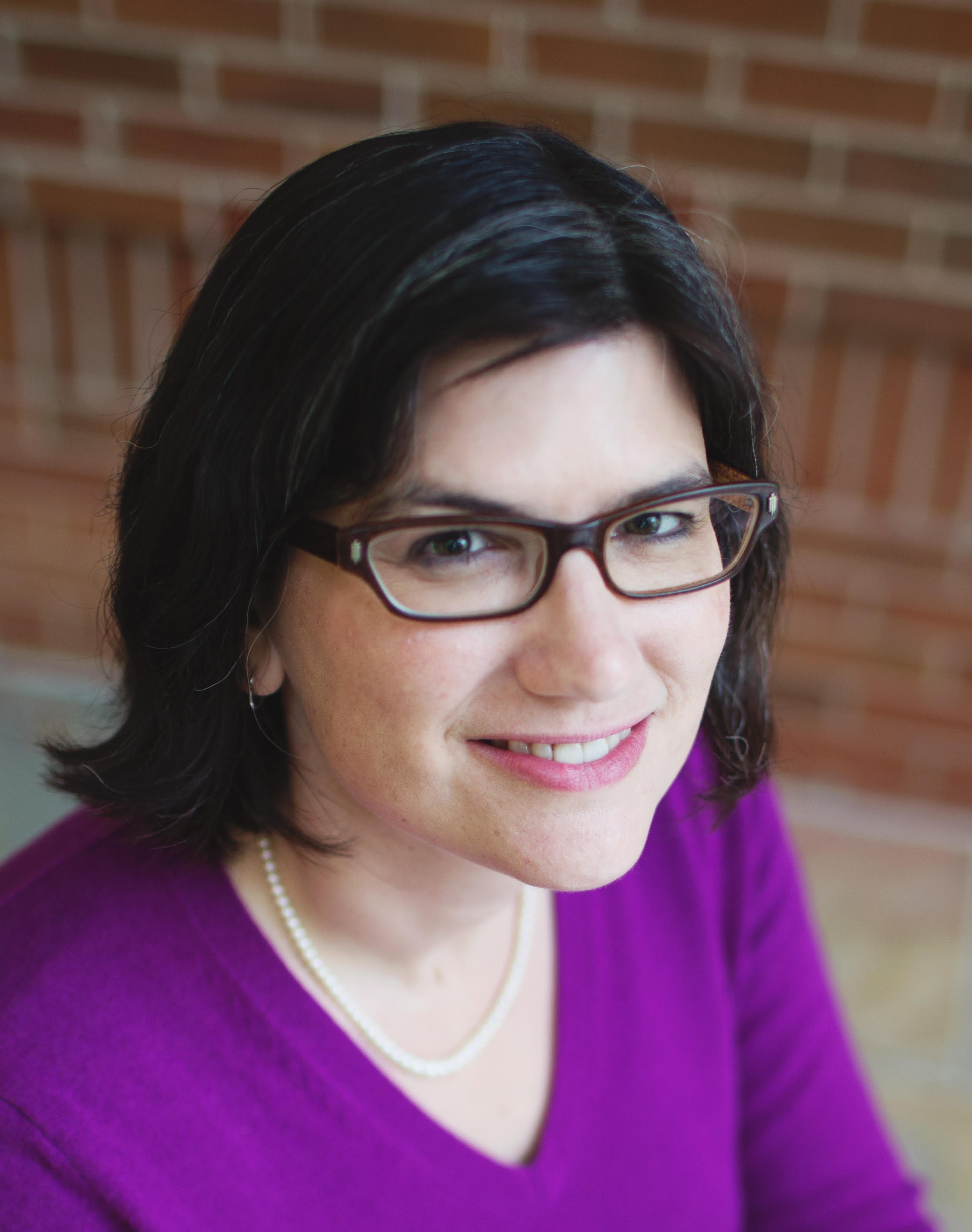
- Education: Stanford University (PhD); Columbia University (BA)
- Awards: Web of Science Highly Cited Researcher Fellow, University of Vermont Gund Fellow, Leshner Leadership Institute Fellow, University of Minnesota Institute on the Environment
- Scientific career
- Fields: ecohydrology, ecosystem services, water resources
- Workplaces: Global Water Security Center, University of Alabama
- Website: https://ua-gwsc.org/kate-brauman/

Kate A. Brauman is an American scientist who uses an interdisciplinary tool set to examine the interactions between land use change and water resources, with a focus on water security. Brauman is the Deputy Director of the Global Water Security Center at The University of Alabama.

== Early life and education ==
Brauman, daughter of two chemists (John I. Brauman and Sharon K Brauman), grew up in the San Francisco Bay Area and had mixed feelings about being a scientist. She notes that it was her undergraduate mentor, Robert Pollack who helped her see the connections between her desire to be creative and affect things that people care about, with science. Brauman graduated summa cum laude with a Bachelor of Arts in Science and Religion from Columbia University in 2000. After college she worked at the Natural Resources Defense Council as the Membership and Public Education Senior Associate. She credits her time at the NRDC for making her realize that environmental issues, in particular water and energy, are areas that people care deeply about and need to be approached from multiple angles: biophysical, economic, and social solutions. Brauman's interdisciplinary dissertation, under the direction of Gretchen Daily and David Freyberg, brought together elements of hydrology, ecohydrology, and economics to understand the impacts of water extraction on the Big Island of Hawaiʻi, at Stanford University. Her work was funded by the National Science Foundation's Graduate Research Fellowship and the Lucille Packard Stanford Graduate Fellowship, within the Emmett Interdisciplinary Program in Environment and Resources with an emphasis in hydrologic ecosystem services in 2010.

== Career and research ==
Kate Brauman is the Deputy Director at the Global Water Security Center at the University of Alabama. Prior to this Brauman served as the Lead Scientist for the University of Minnesota's Institute on the Environment Global Water Initiative, where she was also a member of the Natural Capital Project science team. From 2020 - 2021, Brauman was the Water and Climate Resilience Fellow at the US Department of Defense through a AAAS Science Technology Policy Fellowship.

Brauman's research quantifies how changes in nature affect human wellbeing, with a particular focus on water resources. Her projects include assessment of worldwide trends in water consumption and availability, irrigation and agricultural water use, water security, and the science and implementation of investments in watershed ecosystem services. Brauman's interest in understanding and valuing the ecosystem services of landscapes runs through much of her work, including in her work on the value of information, about hydrology and ecosystem services to decisionmakers. Brauman's research also considers how water and water use connect to national security.

Brauman has also worked on international assessments of the state of nature and ecosystem services. She served as a Coordinating Lead Author for the Global Assessment of the Intergovernmental Platform on Biodiversity and Ecosystem Services (IPBES), released in 2019, and as a Lead Author for the 2021 United Nations Environmental Programme (UNEP) Global Synthesis Report "Making Peace with Nature". In 2019, Brauman testified to the US Congress about the findings of the IPBES Global Assessment.

=== Notable publications ===
Brauman's work, published in a variety of peer-reviewed journals (e.g. Nature, Science, Proceedings of the National Academy Sciences, Environmental Research Letters, Water Resources Research) is highly cited. A few of her most highly cited works are listed below:

- Solutions for a cultivated planet, Nature, 2011
- The Nature and Value of Ecosystem Services: an overview highlights hydrologic services, Annual Review of Environment and Resources, 2007
- Improvements in crop water productivity increase water sustainability and food security - a global analysis, Environmental Research Letters, 2013
- Assessing Nature's Contributions to People. Science, 2018 -

== Awards and recognition ==
- 2012, Planet Under Pressure, Best Early Career Researcher Poster. Water Wise: Are we getting enough crop per drop?
- 2014, Future Earth Fellow, Future Earth Young Scientists Networking Conference on Ecosystems and Human Well being in the green economy
- 2015, Policy Fellow, Center for the Study of Politics and Government, University of Minnesota
- 2018-2019 Fellow for the Leshner Leadership Institute for Public Engagement with Science, run by the American Association for the Advancement of Science's (AAAS) Center for Public Engagement with Science and Technology.
- 2020, University of Vermont Gund Institute Fellow
- 2021, 2022, Clarivate Web of Science Highly Cited Researcher
