= Brauman =

Brauman is a surname, possibly an anglicized variant of the German surname Brauer, meaning "brewer". Notable people with the surname include:

- John Isaiah Brauman (1937–2024), American chemist
- Kate Brauman, American ecologist
- Rony Brauman (born 1950), French tropical physician, former president of Médecins sans frontières
