= Gretchen Daily =

American biologist (born 1964)

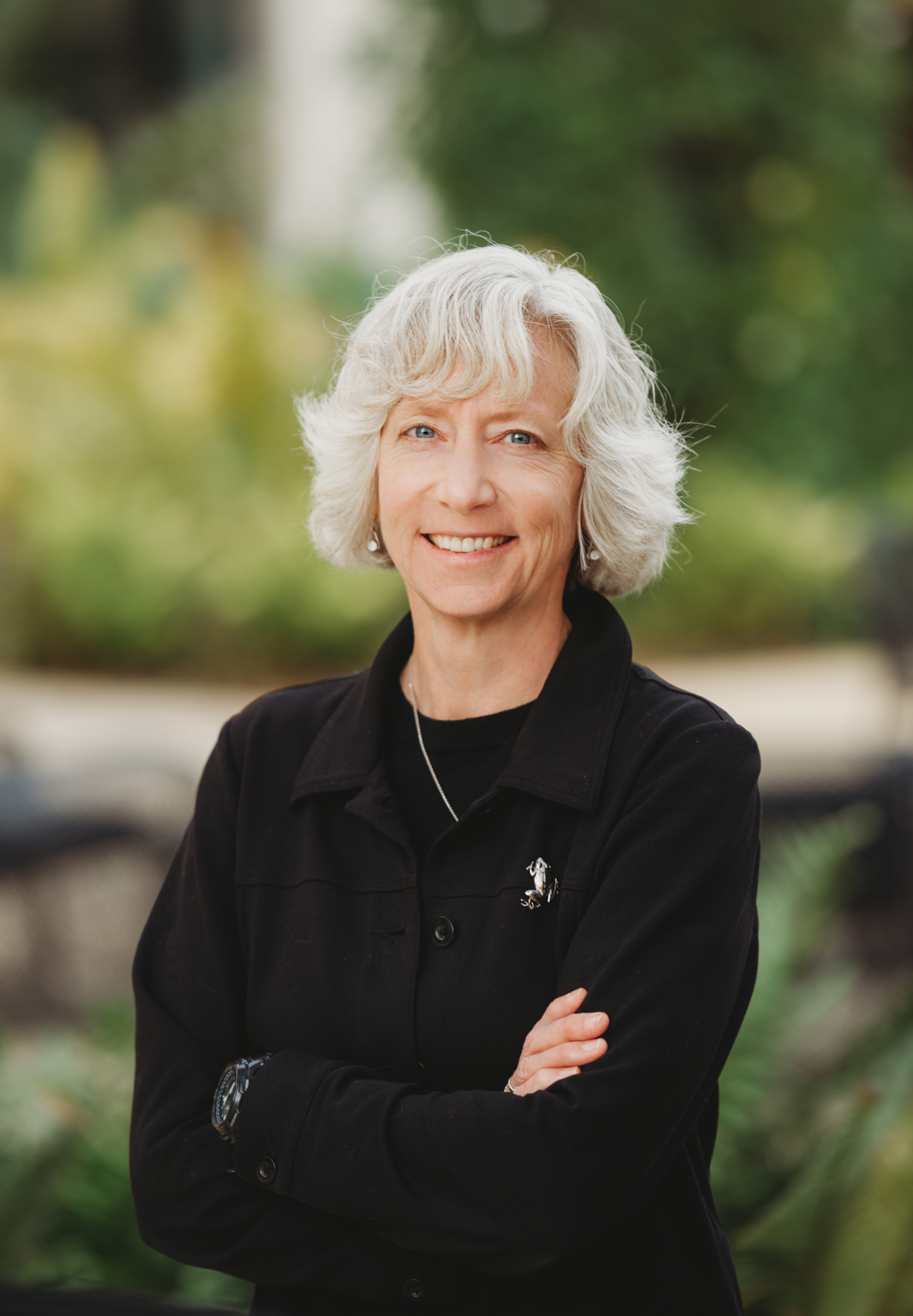
- Daily in 2020
- Born: October 19, 1964 (age 61); Washington D.C., U.S.
- Education: Stanford University
- Known for: Natural capital Biogeography
- Awards: BBVA Foundation Frontiers of Knowledge Award (2019); Blue Planet Prize (2017); Volvo Environment Prize (2012); Fellow of the U.S. National Academy of Sciences; Fellow of the American Academy of Arts and Sciences; Fellow of the American Philosophical Society; Heinz Award with special focus on Global Change (2010)
- Scientific career
- Fields: Biology; Conservation biology Natural capital Ecology; Biogeography; Ecological economics
- Workplaces: Stanford University; Stanford Woods Institute for the Environment; The Nature Conservancy; Natural Capital Project

Gretchen C. Daily (born October 19, 1964) is an American environmental scientist and tropical ecologist. She has contributed to understanding humanity's dependence and impacts on nature, and to advancing a systematic approach for valuing nature in policy, finance, management, and practice around the world. Daily is co-founder and faculty director of the Natural Capital Project, a global partnership that aims to mainstream the values of nature into decision-making of people, governments, investors, corporations, NGOs, and other institutions. Together with more than 300 partners worldwide, the Project is pioneering science, technology, and scalable demonstrations of inclusive, sustainable development.

Based at Stanford University, Daily is the Bing Professor of Environmental Science in the Department of Biology at Stanford University, the director of the Center for Conservation Biology at Stanford, and a senior fellow at the Stanford Woods Institute for the Environment. Daily is an elected fellow of the U.S. National Academy of Sciences, the American Academy of Arts and Sciences and the American Philosophical Society. Daily is a former board member of the Beijer Institute for Ecological Economics at the Royal Swedish Academy of Sciences and of The Nature Conservancy.

== Early life and education ==
Born in Washington, D.C., Daily was raised mostly in California and West Germany, where she graduated from high school in 1982. She then returned to California and earned her B.S. (1986), M.S (1987), and Ph.D. (1992) in biological sciences from Stanford University.

== Career ==
In 1992, Daily was awarded the Winslow/Heinz Postdoctoral Fellow at UC Berkeley's Energy and Resources Group. In 1995 Daily became the Bing Interdisciplinary Research Scientist in the Department of Biological Sciences at Stanford University. During her time as a research scientist, Daily served as the editor of Nature's Services: Societal Dependence on Natural Ecosystems, a foundational book that lays out the framework used widely today for understanding the benefits of nature to people, with numerous examples and ways of considering their value. The Heinz Foundation noted that Nature's Services "has served as a model for ecosystems regulation in several regions of the world and was a catalyst for the U.N.'s Millennium Ecosystem Assessment."

After 7 years as a research scientist, Daily was appointed as an associate professor in the Department of Biological Sciences and as a senior fellow at the Institute of International Studies (both at Stanford University) in 2002. In 2002, Daily published the book The New Economy of Nature: The Quest to Make Conservation Profitable with Pulitzer-Prize winning journalist Katherine Ellison. She has since published a dozen further books, including The Power of Trees (2012) and One Tree (2018) with Charles J. Katz, Green Growth that Works: Natural Capital Policy and Finance Mechanisms from Around the World (2019) with Lisa Mandle, Zhiyun Ouyang, and James Salzman, and Rural Livelihood and Environmental Sustainability in China (2020) with Jie Li, Shuzhuo Li, and Marcus Feldman.

In 2005, Daily was appointed as the Bing Professor of Environmental Science in the Department of Biology at Stanford University, a senior fellow at the Stanford Woods Institute for the Environment and was made the director of the Center for Conservation Biology at Stanford University. As of 2020, Daily serves in all three of these positions.

In 2005, Daily (the project leader from Stanford), along with partners at The Nature Conservancy, and World Wildlife Fund, established the Natural Capital Project. The organization's stated goal is to "improve the well-being of people and our planet by motivating targeted investments in nature." In later years, the core partnership expanded to include the University of Minnesota, the Chinese Academy of Sciences, and the Stockholm Resilience Center, together with over three hundred collaborating institutions. Its signature software, InVEST, is open source, co-developed with users, and now used in 185 countries to reveal the values of nature in specific decisions, and the risks and costs of its loss. As co-founder and Stanford faculty director of the Natural Capital Project, Daily "serves as [the organization's] chief emissary to financial and government leaders." In 2006, Daily became a member of the board of directors of The Nature Conservancy. Daily served as the inaugural Humanitas Visiting Professor in Sustainability Studies at the University of Cambridge in 2013.

== Research ==
Daily's academic profile at the Center for Conservation Biology states that "Daily’s scientific research is on countryside biogeography and the future dynamics of biodiversity change." In an interview, Daily remarked that "'Countryside biogeography' is a new conceptual framework for elucidating the fates of populations, species, and ecosystems in ‘countryside’ – the growing fraction of Earth's unbuilt land surface whose ecosystem qualities are strongly influenced by humanity." To forecast what elements of nature will survive into the future, Daily studies the capacity of nature reserves and agricultural systems to sustain plants, animals, insects, and other organisms.

Using findings from research done in countryside biogeography, Daily, and researchers like her, is attempting to determine what "species are most important and most merit protection" and "what is the scientific basis for deciding" the relative importance of species within a given ecosystem. When asked "which species/systems most merit protection?" Daily responded that she is "actively attempting to link projected changes in biodiversity and ecosystems to changes in 'services' to humanity." She went on to cite "production of goods," "life-support processes," "life-fulfilling conditions" and "options (genetic diversity for future use)" as the services that ecosystems/species provide for people. To characterize the values of nature and the risks and costs of its loss, she advances the interdisciplinary science of ecosystem services, the benefits of nature to people.

As one of the co-founders of the Natural Capital Project, Daily employs her research practically by working "with private landowners, economists, lawyers, business people, and government agencies to incorporate environmental issues into business practice and public policy."

== Author ==
=== The Stork and the Plow ===
In this book, together with Anne Howland Ehrlich and Paul R. Ehrlich, published in 1995 by Yale University Press, the authors look at the interaction between population and food supply and offer a strategy for balancing human numbers with nutritional needs. Their proposals include improving the status of women by giving them equal education, reducing racism and religious prejudice, reforming the agricultural system, and shrinking the growing gap between rich and poor.

This generation faces a set of challenges unprecedented in their scope and severity and in the shortness of time left to resolve them. . . . The Stork and the Plow sets these out thoughtfully [and] accurately. . . . We can all hope this urgent message is carefully heeded.

— Henry W. Kendall, Nobel laureate and Julius A. Stratton Professor of Physics, MIT

=== Nature's Services ===
Nature's Services: Societal Dependence on Natural Ecosystems was published in 1997 by Island Press. Nature's Services starts off with an introduction from Daily titled "What are Ecosystem Services" and another introductory piece by Harold Mooney and Paul Ehrlich that seeks to detail the "fragmentary history" of ecosystem services. After the introductions, the book is split into four distinct sections that address different elements of ecosystem services.

The first section of the book address the economic issues involved in assigning value to ecosystem services in the first place. The next two sections outline different kinds of services that can be provided by nature, "Overarching Services" and "Services Supplied by Major Biomes." The overarching services section includes papers like "Biodiversity and Ecosystem Functioning" by David Tilman, "Ecosystem Services Supplied by Soil" by Daily, Pamela Matson and Peter Vitousek and "Services Provided by Pollinators" by Gary Nabhan and Stephen Buchmann The "Services Provided by Major Biomes" section includes papers regarding topics like "Marine Ecosystems" by Charles Peterson and Jane Lubchenco and "The World's Forests and their Ecosystem Services" by Norman Myers

The last section of the book includes case studies which showcase different services that distinct ecosystems provide to people around the world. Examples include: "Water Quality Improvements by Wetlands" by Katherine Ewel and "Ecosystem Services in a Modern Economy: Gunnison County, Colorado" by Andrew Wilcox and John Harte. In the conclusion of the book, Daily remarks that the "core analyses presented in this book attempt to value ecosystems and their component species only insofar as they confer benefits, in the form of life-support goods and services, to human beings" but that this "focus does not in any way preclude making decisions on the basis of other values as well."

In his review of the book, James Salzman concluded that Nature's Services, in contrast with efforts like the Endangered Species Act, "takes a different, potentially more effective tack, calling for explicit recognition of ecosystem services because of the direct, tangible benefits they provide. Such recognition could provide a more integrated and compelling basis for action than those suggested by a single-species or biodiversity protection for the simple reason that the impacts of those services on humans are more immediate and undeniably important."

=== The New Economy of Nature ===
The New Economy of Nature: The Quest to Make Conservation Profitable was co-written by Daily and Katherine Ellison and was published in 2002 by Island Press. The book presents different cases studies where companies or governments were able to actually profit from their conservation efforts. One chapter describes how New York "decided to meet federal requirements to improve water quality with a less expensive, though more controversial, option of protecting watershed integrity through land purchases and development limits, rather than adopt the technological solution of a multibillion dollar treatment facility." While another chapter offers "an assessment of plans to manage and reduce greenhouse gas emissions by developing a worldwide system of carbon trading patterned on the U.S. experience with pollution."

Kenneth Arrow remarked that Daily and Ellison "have delineated the new movement to make conservation of natural resources financially rewarding and illustrate in a lively and probing manner many cases of profitable activities that also preserve the biosphere."

In his review of the book, Patrick Wilson stated that "The most notable contribution of The New Economy of Nature is its balanced message, optimistic and cautious." He goes on to say that the book "avoids the fallacy that the market is the solution to our environmental protection challenges and that, if allowed to operate free of government intervention, it can somehow make the policymaking choices less problematic and the tradeoffs less daunting" and that "it challenges elements of environmental orthodoxy that hold that the market, because of its short-term orientation and emphasis on profit over conservation, is an intrinsic threat to nature and the only solution is increased government oversight and financial commitment."

=== Green Growth That Works ===
Green Growth That Works: Natural Capital Policy and Finance Mechanisms from Around the World was published in 2019 by Island Press.

== Awards and honors ==
Daily has received numerous prestigious awards and honors throughout her academic career, including the 21st Century Scientist Award (2000), The Sophie Prize (2008), The International Cosmos Prize (2009), The 16th Annual Heinz Award with special focus on global change, the Midori Prize (2010), the Volvo Environment Prize (2012), the Blue Planet Prize (2017), and the Tyler Prize for Environmental Achievement (2020). She has received the 2018 BBVA Foundation Frontiers of Knowledge Award in the category of Ecology and Conservation Biology, jointly with Georgina Mace for developing vital tools facilitating science-based policies “to combat species loss.”

== Selected works ==
Daily has authored, coauthored and/or edited five books. Daily has published about 400 scientific and popular articles. She has published articles in many prestigious journals, including Proceedings of the National Academy of Sciences of the United States of America, Nature and Science.

Some of her most cited/influential publications:

- Snyder, J. A.; DeFries. R.; Asner, G.; Barford, C.; Daily, G.; et al. (22 July 2005). "Global Consequences of Land Use". Science. 309 (5734): 570–574. Bibcode:2005Sci...309..570F. doi:10.1126/science.1111772. PMID 16040698. S2CID 5711915.
- Daily, G. C.; Söderqvist T; Aniyar S; Arrow K; Dasgupta P; Ehrlich PR; et al. (21 July 2000). "ECOLOGY: The Value of Nature and the Nature of Value". Science. 289 (5478): 395–396. doi:10.1126/science.289.5478.395. PMID 10939949. S2CID 27639803.
- Ricketts, T. H.; GC Daily; PR Ehrlich; C Michener (16 August 2004). "Economic value of tropical forest to coffee production". Proceedings of the National Academy of Sciences. 101 (34): 12579–12582. Bibcode:2004PNAS..10112579R. doi:10.1073/pnas.0405147101. PMC 515099. PMID 15306689.
- Daily, Gretchen C; Polasky, Stephen; Goldstein, Joshua; Kareiva, Peter M; Mooney, Harold A; Pejchar, Liba; Ricketts, Taylor H; Salzman, James; Shallenberger, Robert (1 February 2009). "Ecosystem services in decision making: time to deliver". Frontiers in Ecology and the Environment. 7 (1): 21–28. Bibcode:2009FrEE....7...21D. doi:10.1890/080025.
- Daily, Gretchen; Paul R. Ehrlich (November 1992). "Population, Sustainability, and Earth's Carrying Capacity". BioScience. 42 (10): 761–771. doi:10.2307/1311995. JSTOR 1311995.

== See also ==
- Ecosystem valuation
