= Ecosystem-based adaptation =

Set of approaches to adapt to climate change

Ecosystem-based adaptation (EbA) encompasses a broad set of approaches to adapt to climate change. They all involve the management of ecosystems and their services to reduce the vulnerability of human communities to the impacts of climate change. The Convention on Biological Diversity (CBD) defines EBA as "the use of biodiversity and ecosystem services as part of an overall adaptation strategy to help people to adapt to the adverse effects of climate change".

EbA involves the conservation, sustainable management and restoration of ecosystems, such as forests, grasslands, wetlands, mangroves or coral reefs to reduce the harmful impacts of climate hazards including shifting patterns or levels of rainfall, changes in maximum and minimum temperatures, stronger storms, and increasingly variable climatic conditions. EbA measures can be implemented on their own or in combination with engineered approaches (such as the construction of water reservoirs or dykes), hybrid measures (such as artificial reefs) and approaches that strengthen the capacities of individuals and institutions to address climate risks (such as the introduction of early warning systems).

Collaborative planning among scientists, policy makers, and community members is an essential element of Ecosystem-based Adaptation. By drawing on the expertise of outside experts and local residents alike, EbA seeks to develop unique solutions to unique problems, rather than simply replicating past projects.

EbA is nested within the broader concept of nature-based solutions and complements and shares common elements with a wide variety of other approaches to building the resilience of social-ecological systems. These approaches include community-based adaptation, ecosystem-based disaster risk reduction, climate-smart agriculture, and green infrastructure, and often place emphasis on using participatory and inclusive processes and community/stakeholder engagement. The concept of EbA has been promoted through international fora, including the processes of the United Nations Framework Convention on Climate Change (UNFCCC) and the CBD. A number of countries make explicit references to EbA in their strategies for adaptation to climate change and their Nationally Determined Contributions (NDCs) under the Paris Agreement.

While the barriers to widespread uptake of EbA by public and private sector stakeholders and decision makers are substantial, cooperation toward generating a greater understanding of the potential of EbA is well established among researchers, advocates, and practitioners from nature conservation and sustainable development groups. EbA is increasingly viewed as an effective means of addressing the linked challenges of climate change and poverty in developing countries, where many people are dependent on natural resources for their lives and livelihoods.

== Overview ==
Ecosystem-based Adaptation (EbA) describes a variety of approaches for adapting to climate change, all of which involve the management of ecosystems to reduce the vulnerability of human communities to the impacts of climate change such as storm and flood damage to physical assets, coastal erosion, salinisation of freshwater resources, and loss of agricultural productivity. EbA lies at the intersection of climate change adaptation, socio-economic development, and biodiversity conservation (see Figure 1).

While ecosystem services have always been used by societies, the term Ecosystem-based Adaptation was coined in 2008 by the International Union for Conservation of Nature (IUCN) and its member institutions at the UN Climate Change Convention Conference in 2008. EbA was officially defined in 2009 at the UN Convention on Biological Diversity Conference.

=== Adaptation to climate change hazards ===
Healthy ecosystems provide important ecosystem services that can contribute to climate change adaptation. For example, healthy mangrove ecosystems provide protection from the impacts of climate change, often for some of the world's most vulnerable people, by absorbing wave energy and storm surges, adapting to rising sea levels, and stabilizing shorelines from erosion. EbA focuses on benefits that humans derive from biodiversity and ecosystem services and how these benefits can be used for managing risk to climate change impacts. Adaptation to climate change is particularly urgent in developing countries and many Small Island Developing States that are already experiencing some of the most severe impacts of climate change, have economies that are highly sensitive to disruptions, and that have lower adaptive capacity.

=== Making active use of biodiversity and ecosystem services ===
EbA can involve a wide range of ecosystem management activities that aim to reduce the vulnerability of people to climate change hazards (such as rising sea levels, changing rainfall patterns, and stronger storms) through using nature. For example, EbA measures include coastal habitat restoration in ecosystems such as; coral reefs, mangrove forests, and marshes to protect communities and infrastructure from storm surges; agroforestry to increase resilience of crops to droughts or excessive rainfall; integrated water resource management to cope with consecutive dry days and change in rainfall patterns; and sustainable forest management interventions to stabilise slopes, prevent landslides, and regulate water flow to prevent flash flooding (see Table 1 and Figure 2).

=== Co-benefits of EbA ===
By deploying EbA, proponents cite that many other benefits to people and nature are delivered simultaneously. These correlated benefits include improved human health, socioeconomic development, food security and water security, disaster risk reduction, carbon sequestration, and biodiversity conservation. For example, restoration of ecosystems such as forests and coastal wetlands can contribute to food security and enhance livelihoods through the collection of non-timber forest products, maintain watershed functionality, and sequester carbon to mitigate global warming. Restoration of mangrove ecosystems can help increase food and livelihood security by supporting fisheries, and reduce disaster risk by decreasing wave height and strength during hurricanes and storms.

== Implementation and examples ==
=== Examples of EBA measures and outcomes ===
Particular ecosystems can provide a variety of specific climate change adaptation benefits (or services). The most suitable EbA measures will depend on local context, the health of the ecosystem and the primary climate change hazard that needs to be addressed. The below table provides an overview of these factors, common EbA measures and intended outcomes.

Table 1. Examples of EBA measures and outcomes. The table shows climate hazards and their potential impacts on people, as well as examples of corresponding EbA measures. Many of the same climate hazards affect different ecosystems and have similar impacts on people, as such, the table illustrates the overlap between impacts, EbA measures and adaptation outcomes. Adapted from the PANORAMA database
Climate change hazards	Potential impacts on people	EBA measures by ecosystem type	Expected outcomes
Erratic rainfall Floods Shift of seasons Temperature increases Drought Extreme heat	Higher flood risks for people and infrastructure; Decrease in agricultural (and livestock) production; Food insecurities; Economic losses and/or insecurities; Threats to human health and well-being; Higher risk of heat strokes Lack of water	Mountains and forests: Sustainable mountain wetland management; Forest and pasture restoration; Inland waters: Conservation of wetlands and peat lands; River basin restoration; Trans-boundary water governance and ecosystem restoration; Agriculture and drylands: Ecosystem restoration and agroforestry; Using trees to adapt to changing seasons; Intercropping of adapted species; Sustainable livestock management and pasture restoration; Sustainable dryland management; Urban areas: Green aeration corridors for cities; Storm water management using green spaces; River restoration in urban areas; Green facades for buildings	Improved water regulation; Erosion prevention; Improved water storage capacity; Flood risk reduction; Improved water provisioning; Improved water storage capacity; Adaptation to higher temperatures; Heat wave buffering
Storm surges Cyclones Sea level rise Salinisation Coastal erosion	Higher flood risks for people and infrastructure; Higher storm and cyclone risk for people and infrastructure; Decrease in agricultural (and livestock) production; Food insecurities; Economic losses and/or insecurities; Threats to human health and well-being; Lack of potable water	Marine and coastal: Mangrove restoration and coastal protection; Coastal realignment; Sustainable fishing and mangrove rehabilitation; Coastal reef restoration	Storm and cyclone reduction; Flood risk reduction; Improved water quality; Adaptation to higher temperatures

=== Principles and standards for implementing EBA ===
Since the evolution of the concept and practice of EBA, various principles and standards have been developed to guide best practices for implementation. The guidelines adopted by the CBD build on these efforts and include a set of principles to guide planning and implementation. The principles are broadly clustered into four themes:

1. Building resilience and enhancing adaptive capacity through EBA interventions;
2. Ensuring inclusivity and equity in planning and implementation;
3. Consideration of multiple spatial and temporal scales in the design of EBA interventions;
4. Improving the effectiveness and efficiency of EBA, for example, by incorporating adaptive management, identifying limitations and trade-offs, integrating the knowledge of indigenous peoples and local communities.

These principles are complemented by safeguards, which are social and environmental measures to avoid unintended consequences of EBA to people, ecosystems and biodiversity.

Standards have also been developed to help practitioners understand what interventions qualify as EBA, including the elements of helping people adapt to climate change, making active use of biodiversity and ecosystem services, and being part of an overall adaptation strategy.

==== Challenges ====
Although interest in Ecosystem-based Adaptation has grown, and meta-analyses of case studies are demonstrating the efficacy and cost-effectiveness of EbA interventions, there are recognized challenges that should be addressed or considered to increase adoption of the approach. These include:

===== Potential limitations of ecosystem services under a changing climate. =====
One challenge facing EbA is the identification of limits and thresholds beyond which EbA might not deliver adaptation benefits and the extent ecosystems can provide ecosystem services under a changing climate.

===== Difficulty in monitoring, evaluation, and establishing the evidence base for effective EbA =====
Confusion around what Ecosystem-based Adaptation means has led to an array of different methodologies used for assessments, and the lack of consistent and comparable quantitative measures of EbA success and failure makes it difficult to argue the case for EbA in socio-economic terms. EbA research has also relied heavily on Western scientific knowledge without due consideration of local and traditional knowledge. In addition, it can be difficult to implement a plan for monitoring and evaluation due to potentially long timescales required to observe the impacts of EbA.

===== Governance and institutional constraints =====
Because EbA is a multi-sectoral policy issue, the challenges of governing and planning are immense. This is due in part to the fact that EbA involves both the sectors that manage ecosystems and those that benefit from ecosystem services.

===== Economic and financial constraints =====
Broad macroeconomic considerations such as economic development, poverty, and access to financial capital to implement climate adaptation options are contributing factors to constraints impeding greater uptake of EbA. Public and multilateral funding for EbA projects thus far has been available through the International Climate Initiative of the German Federal Ministry for the Environment, Nature Conservation and Nuclear Safety, the Global Environment Facility, the Green Climate Fund, the European Union, the Department for International Development of the Government of the United Kingdom, the Swedish International Development Cooperation Agency and the Danish International Development Agency, among other sources.

===== Social and cultural barriers =====
A clear factor constraining EbA is varying perceptions of risks and cultural preferences for particular types of management approaches such as cultural preferences for what a particular landscape should look like. Potential stakeholders can hold negative perceptions about particular types of EbA strategies.

== Policy frameworks ==
Several international policy fora have acknowledged the multiple roles that ecosystems play in delivering services and addressing global challenges, including those related to climate change, natural disasters, sustainable development, and biodiversity conservation.

=== Latest updates ===
The Global EbA Fund supported initiatives that integrated women from dryland communities into the seventeenth session of the Conference of the Parties (COP17) of the United Nations Convention to Combat Desertification (UNCCD), which took place from August 17 to August 28, 2026, in Ulaanbaatar, Mongolia. Through capacity-building, mentoring, and knowledge exchange programs, female participants from community-level and women-led organizations engaged in international negotiations to share local experiences regarding land restoration and Ecosystem-based Adaptation. The initiative focused on establishing structural connections between local actions and global policy frameworks. The implementation model emphasized that institutional participation requires continuous investment, resource access, and long-term mentorship beyond individual conference attendance. Project documentation highlighted that sustained support mechanisms are necessary to build lasting capacity, open pathways from community-level action to international advocacy, and ensure that knowledge acquired at global events returns to benefit local organizations and communities.

=== Climate change policy ===
The Paris Agreement explicitly recognises nature's role in helping people and societies address climate change, calling on all Parties to acknowledge "the importance of ensuring the integrity of all ecosystems, including oceans, and the protection of biodiversity, recognised by some cultures as Mother Earth"; its Articles include several references to ecosystems, natural resources and forests.

This notion has translated into high-level national intent, as revealed by comparative analyses of the Nationally Determined Contributions (NDCs) submitted to the UN Framework Convention on Climate Change (UNFCCC) by signatories of the Paris Agreement. The UNFCCC also established the national adaptation plan (NAP) process as a way to facilitate adaptation planning in least developed countries (LDCs) and other developing countries. Because of their lower level of development, climate change risks magnify development challenges for LDCs.

=== Disaster risk reduction policy ===
Measures and interventions applied as part of EbA are often closely linked or similar to those employed under ecosystem-based disaster risk reduction (Eco-DRR). The Sendai Framework for Disaster Risk Reduction acknowledges that in order to strengthen disaster risk governance and manage disaster risk and risk reduction at global and regional levels, it is important "to promote transboundary cooperation to enable policy and planning for the implementation of ecosystem-based approaches with regard to shared resources, such as within river basins and along coastlines, to build resilience and reduce disaster risk, including epidemic and displacement risk".

=== Sustainable development policy ===
The Sustainable Development Goals (SDGs) are a collection of 17 global goals set by the United Nations General Assembly in 2015. Biodiversity and ecosystems feature prominently across many of the SDGs and associated targets. They contribute directly to human well-being and development priorities. Biodiversity is at the centre of many economic activities, particularly those related to crop and livestock agriculture, forestry, and fisheries. Globally, nearly half of the human population is directly dependent on natural resources for its livelihood, and many of the most vulnerable people depend directly on biodiversity to fulfil their daily subsistence needs. Ecosystem-based Adaptation offers potential to contribute towards the implementation of numerous SDGs, including the goals related to climate adaptation (SDG 13), eliminating poverty and hunger (SDGs 1 and 2), ensuring livelihoods and economic growth (SDG 8) and life on land and life under water (SDGs 14 and 15), among others.

=== Biodiversity conservation policy ===
The Strategic Plan for Biodiversity 2011–2020 and the Aichi Biodiversity Targets, under the Convention on Biological Diversity (CBD), aim to halt the loss of biodiversity to ensure ecosystems are resilient and continue to provide essential services. Most recently, the Conference of the Parties has adopted voluntary guidelines for the design and effective implementation of ecosystem-based approaches to adaptation and disaster risk reduction.

EbA and similar approaches have been called for in other policy frameworks, including the United Nations Convention to Combat Desertification (UNCCD) and the Ramsar Convention.
