= Nature-based solutions =

Sustainable use of nature for tackling socio-environmental challenges

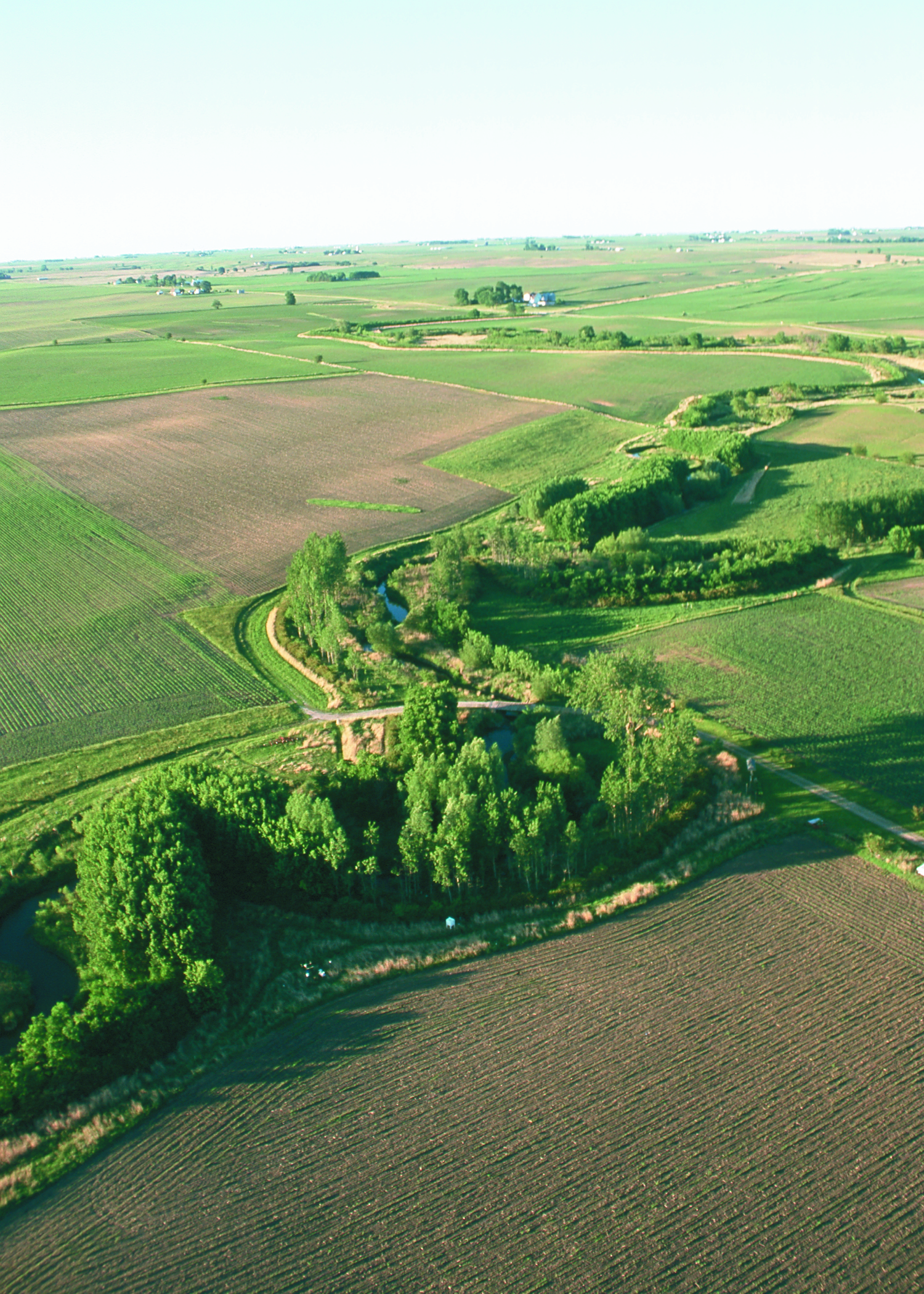
Example of a nature-based solution in water resource management: this riparian buffer protects a creek in Iowa, United States, from the impact of adjacent land uses.

Nature-based solutions (or nature-based systems, abbreviated as NBS or NbS) describe the development and sustainable use of natural processes and biodiversity to address diverse socio-environmental issues. These issues include climate change mitigation, adaptation, and Climate restoration, human security issues such as water security and food security, and disaster risk reduction. The aim is that resilient ecosystems (whether natural, managed, or newly created) provide solutions for the benefit of both societies and biodiversity.

The concept of NBS is related to the concept of ecological engineering and ecosystem-based adaptation. NBS are also related, conceptually to the practice of ecological restoration. The sustainable management approach is a key aspect of NBS development and implementation.

The 2019 UN Climate Action Summit highlighted nature-based solutions as an effective method to combat climate change. For example, nature-based systems for climate change adaptation can include natural flood management, restoring natural coastal defences, and providing local cooling.

Mangrove restoration efforts along coastlines provide an example of a nature-based solution that can achieve multiple goals. Mangroves moderate the impact of waves and wind on coastal settlements or cities, and they sequester carbon. They also provide nursery zones for marine life which is important for sustaining fisheries. Additionally, mangrove forests can help to control coastal erosion resulting from sea level rise.

Green roofs, blue roofs and green walls (as part of green infrastructure) are also nature-based solutions that can be implemented in urban areas. They can reduce the effects of urban heat islands, capture stormwater, abate pollution, and act as carbon sinks. At the same time, they can enhance local biodiversity.

NBS systems and solutions are forming an increasing part of national and international policies on climate change. They are included in climate change policy, infrastructure investment, and climate finance mechanisms. The European Commission has paid increasing attention to NBS since 2013. This is reflected in the majority of global NBS case studies reviewed by Debele et al (2023) being located in Europe. While there is much scope for scaling-up nature-based systems and solutions globally, they frequently encounter numerous challenges during planning and implementation.

The IPCC pointed out that the term is "the subject of ongoing debate, with concerns that it may lead to the misunderstanding that NbS on its own can provide a global solution to climate change". To clarify this point further, the IPCC also stated that "nature-based systems cannot be regarded as an alternative to, or a reason to delay, deep cuts in GHG emissions".

== Definition ==
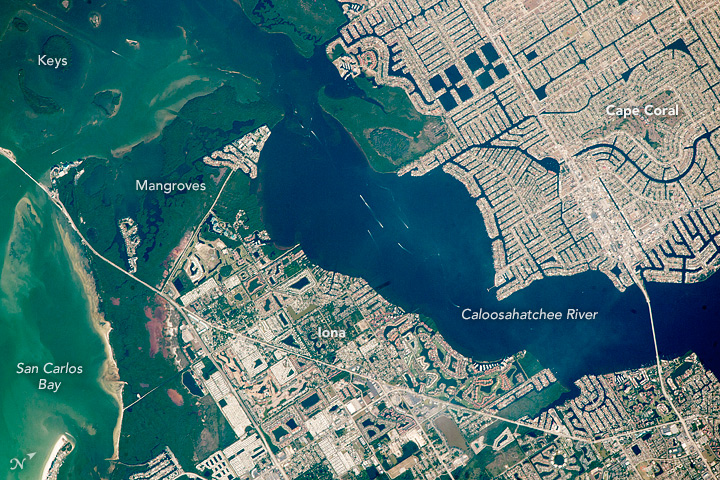
Mangroves protect coastlines against erosion (Cape Coral, Florida, United States).

The International Union for Conservation of Nature (IUCN) defines NBS as "actions to protect, sustainably manage, and restore natural or modified ecosystems, that address societal challenges effectively and adaptively, simultaneously providing human well-being and biodiversity benefits". Societal challenges of relevance here include climate change, food security, disaster risk reduction, water security.

In other words: "Nature-based solutions are interventions that use the natural functions of healthy ecosystems to protect the environment but also provide numerous economic and social benefits." They are used both in the context of climate change mitigation as well as adaptation.

The European Commission's definition of NBS states that these solutions are "inspired and supported by nature, which are cost-effective, simultaneously provide environmental, social and economic benefits and help build resilience. Such solutions bring more, and more diverse, nature and natural features and processes into cities, landscapes, and seascapes, through locally adapted, resource-efficient and systemic interventions". In 2020, the EC definition was updated to further emphasise that "Nature-based solutions must benefit biodiversity and support the delivery of a range of ecosystem services."

The IPCC Sixth Assessment Report pointed out that the term nature-based solutions is "widely but not universally used in the scientific literature". As of 2017, the term NBS was still regarded as "poorly defined and vague".

The term ecosystem-based adaptation (EbA) is a subset of nature-based solutions and "aims to maintain and increase the resilience and reduce the vulnerability of ecosystems and people in the face of the adverse effects of climate change".

=== History of the term ===
The term nature-based solutions was put forward by practitioners in the late 2000s. At that time it was used by international organisations such as the International Union for Conservation of Nature and the World Bank in the context of finding new solutions to mitigate and adapt to climate change effects by working with natural ecosystems rather than relying purely on engineering interventions.

Many indigenous peoples have recognised the natural environment as playing an important role in human well-being as part of their traditional knowledge systems, but this idea did not enter into modern scientific literature until the 1970's with the concept of ecosystem services.

The IUCN referred to NBS in a position paper for the United Nations Framework Convention on Climate Change. The term was also adopted by European policymakers, in particular by the European Commission, in a report stressing that NBS can offer innovative means to create jobs and growth as part of a green economy. The term started to make appearances in the mainstream media around the time of the Global Climate Action Summit in California in September 2018.

== Objectives and framing ==
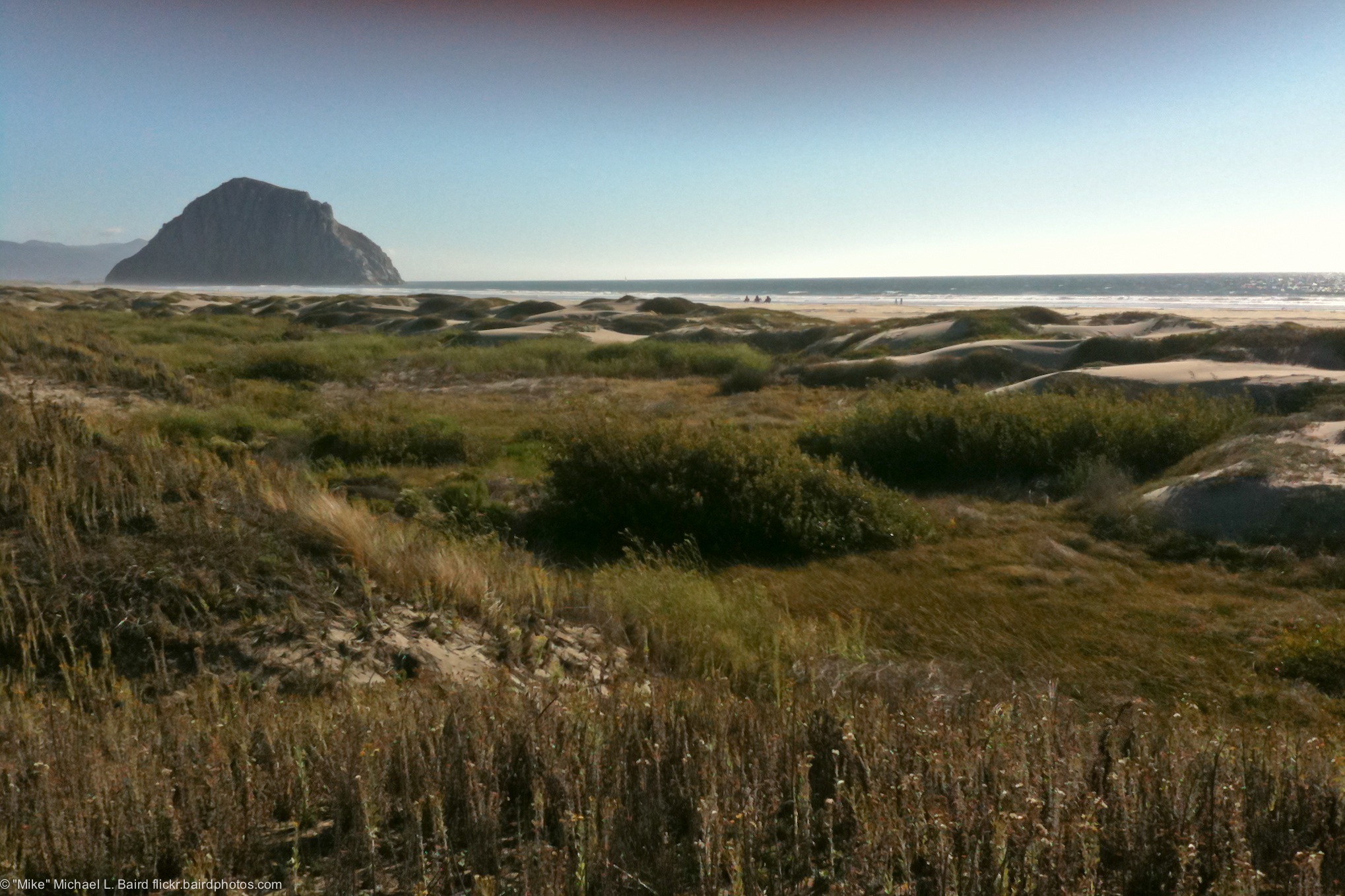
Coastal habitat protection at Morro Strand State Beach in San Luis Obispo County, California.

Nature-based solutions stress the sustainable use of nature in solving coupled environmental-social-economic challenges. NBS go beyond traditional biodiversity conservation and management principles by "re-focusing" the debate on humans and specifically integrating societal factors such as human well-being and poverty reduction, socio-economic development, and governance principles.

The general objective of NBS is clear, namely the sustainable management and use of Nature for tackling societal challenges. However, different stakeholders view NBS from a variety of perspectives. For instance, the IUCN puts the need for well-managed and restored ecosystems at the heart of NBS, with the overarching goal of "Supporting the achievement of society's development goals and safeguard human well-being in ways that reflect cultural and societal values and enhance the resilience of ecosystems, their capacity for renewal and the provision of services".

The European Commission underlines that NBS can transform environmental and societal challenges into innovation opportunities, by turning natural capital into a source for green growth and sustainable development. Within this viewpoint, nature-based solutions to societal challenges "bring more, and more diverse, nature and natural features and processes into cities, landscapes and seascapes, through locally adapted, resource-efficient and systemic interventions". As a result, NBS has been suggested as a means of implementing the nature-positive goal to halt and reverse nature loss by 2030, and achieve full nature recovery by 2050.

== Categories ==
The IUCN proposes to consider NBS as an umbrella concept. Categories and examples of NBS approaches according to the IUCN include:

Category of NBS approaches	Examples
Ecosystem restoration approaches	Ecological restoration, ecological engineering, forest landscape restoration
Issue-specific ecosystem-related approaches	Ecosystem-based adaptation, ecosystem-based mitigation, climate adaptation services, ecosystem-based disaster risk reduction
Infrastructure-related approaches	Natural infrastructure, green infrastructure
Ecosystem-based management approaches	Integrated coastal zone management, integrated water resources management
Ecosystem protection approaches	Area-based conservation approaches including protected area management

== Types ==
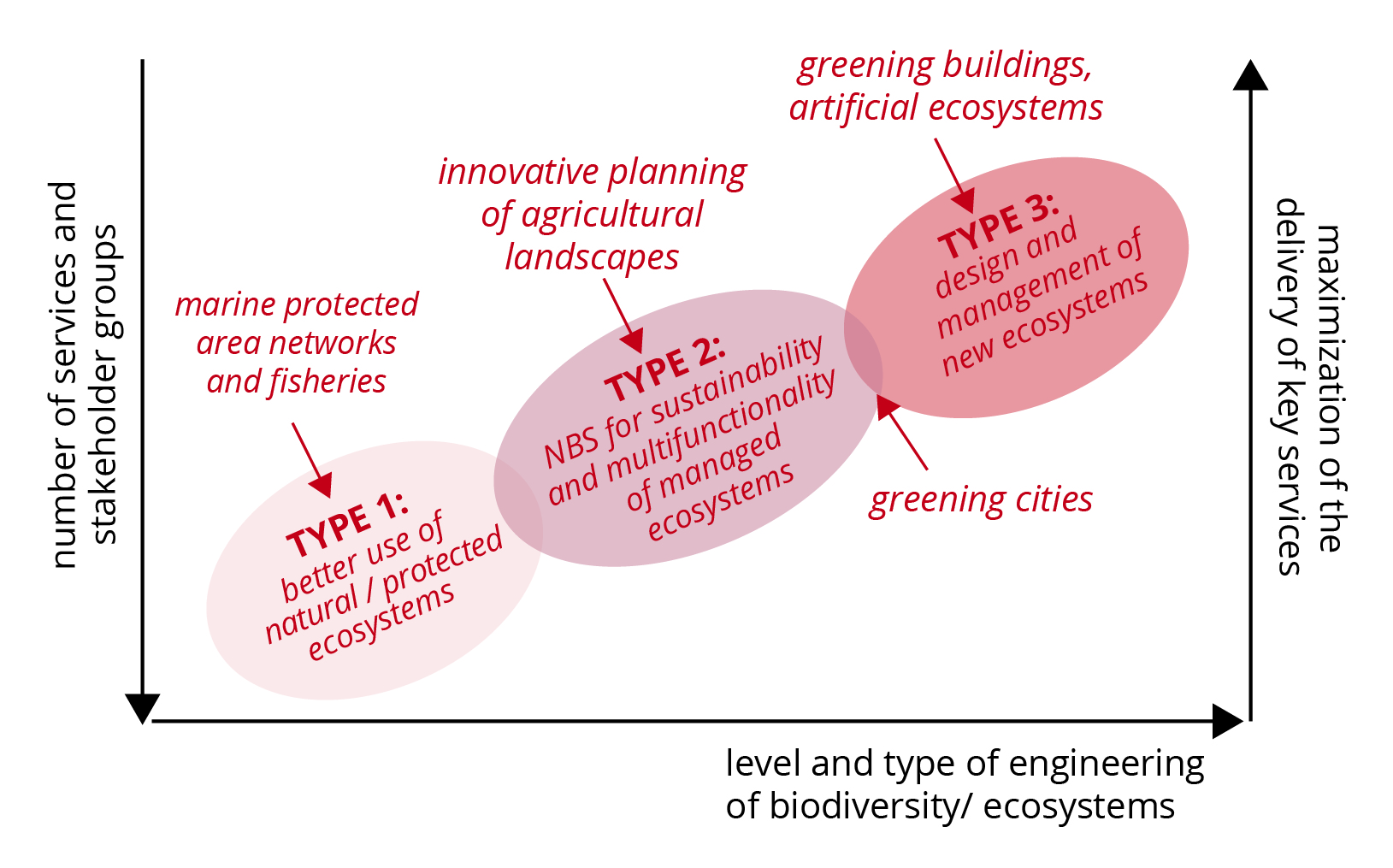
Schematic presentation of the NBS typology.

Scientists have proposed a typology to characterise NBS along two gradients:

1. "How much engineering of biodiversity and ecosystems is involved in NBS", and
2. "How many ecosystem services and stakeholder groups are targeted by a given NBS".

The typology highlights that NBS can involve very different actions on ecosystems (from protection, to management, or even the creation of new ecosystems) and is based on the assumption that the higher the number of services and stakeholder groups targeted, the lower the capacity to maximise the delivery of each service and simultaneously fulfil the specific needs of all stakeholder groups.

As such, three types of NBS are distinguished (hybrid solutions exist along this gradient both in space and time. For instance, at a landscape scale, mixing protected and managed areas could be required to fulfill multi-functionality and sustainability goals):

=== Type 1 – Minimal intervention in ecosystems ===
Type 1 consists of no or minimal intervention in ecosystems, with the objectives of maintaining or improving the delivery of a range of ecosystem services both inside and outside of these conserved ecosystems. Examples include the protection of mangroves in coastal areas to limit risks associated with extreme weather conditions; and the establishment of marine protected areas to conserve biodiversity within these areas while exporting fish and other biomass into fishing grounds. This type of NBS is connected to, for example, the concept of biosphere reserves.

=== Type 2 – Some interventions in ecosystems and landscapes ===
Type 2 corresponds to management approaches that develop sustainable and multifunctional ecosystems and landscapes (extensively or intensively managed). These types improve the delivery of selected ecosystem services compared to what would be obtained through a more conventional intervention. Examples include innovative planning of agricultural landscapes to increase their multi-functionality; using existing agrobiodiversity to increase biodiversity, connectivity, and resilience in landscapes; and approaches for enhancing tree species and genetic diversity to increase forest resilience to extreme events. This type of NBS is strongly connected to concepts like agroforestry.

=== Type 3 – Managing ecosystems in extensive ways ===
Type 3 consists of managing ecosystems in very extensive ways or even creating new ecosystems (e.g., artificial ecosystems with new assemblages of organisms for green roofs and walls to mitigate city warming and clean polluted air). Type 3 is linked to concepts like green and blue infrastructures and objectives like restoration of heavily degraded or polluted areas and greening cities. Constructed wetlands are one example for a Type 3 NBS.

== Applications ==
=== Climate change mitigation and adaptation ===
The 2019 UN Climate Action Summit highlighted nature-based solutions as an effective method to combat climate change. For example, NBS in the context of climate action can include natural flood management, restoring natural coastal defences, providing local cooling, restoring natural fire regimes.

The Paris Agreement calls on all Parties to recognise the role of natural ecosystems in providing services such as that of carbon sinks. Article 5.2 encourages Parties to adopt conservation and management as a tool for increasing carbon stocks and Article 7.1 encourages Parties to build the resilience of socioeconomic and ecological systems through economic diversification and sustainable management of natural resources. The Agreement refers to nature (ecosystems, natural resources, forests) in 13 distinct places. An in-depth analysis of all Nationally Determined Contributions submitted to UNFCCC, revealed that around 130 NDCs or 65% of signatories commit to nature-based solutions in their climate pledges. This suggests a broad consensus for the role of nature in helping to meet climate change goals. However, high-level commitments rarely translate into robust, measurable actions on-the-ground.

A global systemic map of evidence was produced to determine and illustrate the effectiveness of NBS for climate change adaptation. After sorting through 386 case studies with computer programs, the study found that NBS were just as, if not more, effective than traditional or alternative flood management strategies. 66% of cases evaluated reported positive ecological outcomes, 24% did not identify a change in ecological conditions and less than 1% reported negative impacts. Furthermore, NBS always had better social and climate change mitigation impacts.

In the 2019 UN Climate Action Summit, nature-based solutions were one of the main topics covered, and were discussed as an effective method to combat climate change. A "Nature-Based Solution Coalition" was created, including dozens of countries, led by China and New Zealand.

=== Urban areas ===
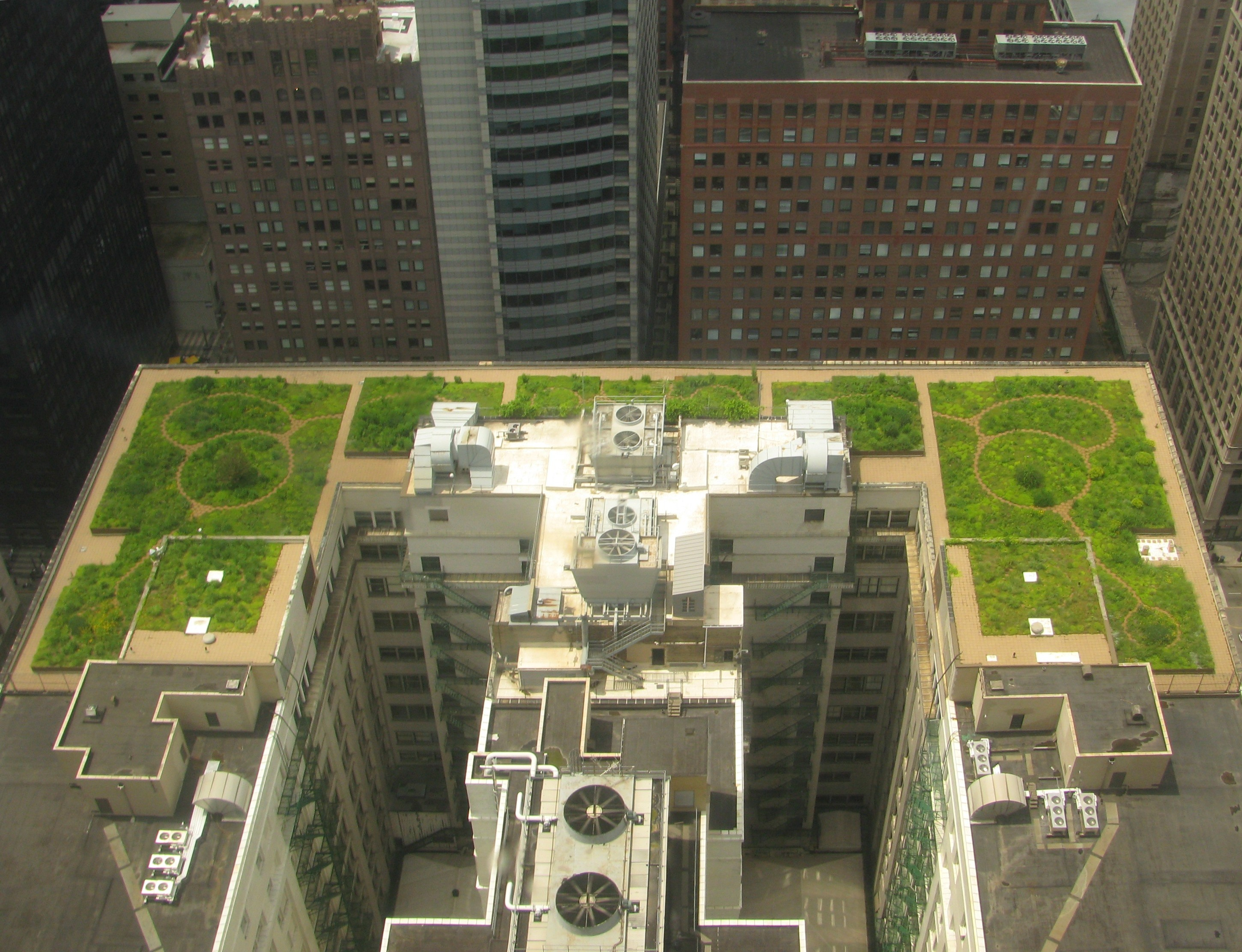
Example of nature-based solution for an urban area: Chicago City Hall green roof. One of the benefits is that it mitigates the urban heat island effect,

Since around 2017, many studies have proposed ways of planning and implementing nature-based solutions in urban areas.

It is crucial that grey infrastructures continue to be used with green infrastructure. Multiple studies recognise that while NBS is very effective and improves flood resilience, it is unable to act alone and must be in coordination with grey infrastructure. Using green infrastructure alone or grey infrastructure alone are less effective than when the two are used together. When NBS is used alongside grey infrastructure the benefits transcend flood management and improve social conditions, increase carbon sequestration and prepare cities for planning for resilience.

In the 1970s a popular approach in the U.S. was that of Best Management Practices (BMP) for using nature as a model for infrastructure and development while the UK had a model for flood management called "sustainable drainage systems". Another framework called "Water Sensitive Urban Design" (WSUD) came out of Australia in the 1990s while Low Impact Development (LID) came out of the U.S. Eventually New Zealand reframed LID to create "Low Impact Urban Design and Development" (LIUDD) with a focus on using diverse stakeholders as a foundation. Then in the 2000s the western hemisphere largely adopted "Green Infrastructure" for stormwater management as well as enhancing social, economic and environmental conditions for sustainability.

In a Chinese National Government program, the Sponge Cities Program, planners are using green grey infrastructure in 30 Chinese cities as a way to manage pluvial flooding and climate change risk after rapid urbanization.

=== Water management aspects ===
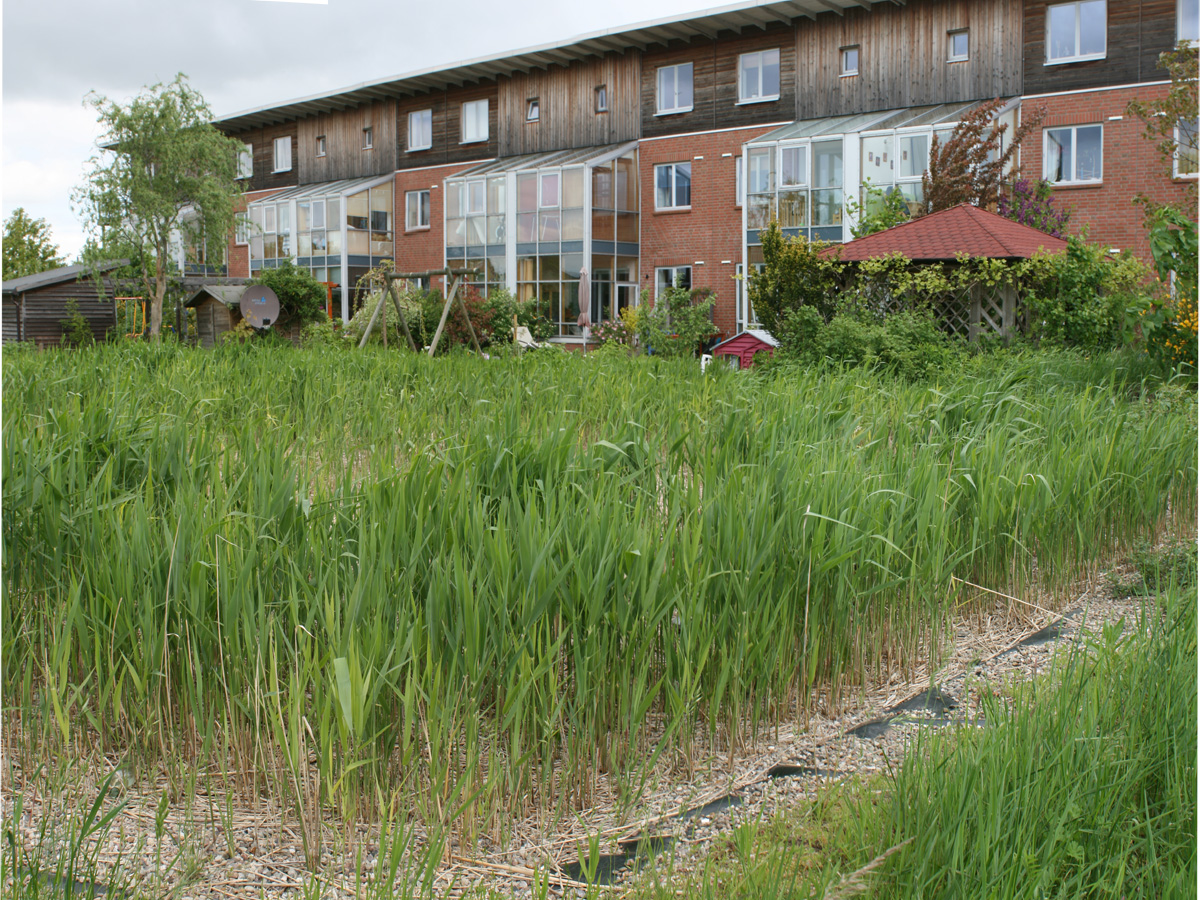
Example of a Type 3 nature-based solution: Constructed wetland for wastewater treatment at an ecological housing estate in Flintenbreite, Germany

With respect to water issues, NBS can achieve the following:

- Use natural processes to enhance water availability (e.g., soil moisture retention, groundwater recharge),
- Improve water quality (e.g., natural wetlands and constructed wetlands to treat wastewater; riparian buffer strips), and
- Reduce risks associated with water‐related disasters and climate change (e.g., floodplain restoration, green roofs).

The UN has also tried to promote a shift in perspective towards NBS: the theme for World Water Day 2018 was "Nature for Water", while UN-Water's accompanying UN World Water Development Report was titled "Nature-based Solutions for Water".

For example, the Lancaster Environment Centre has implemented catchments at different scales on flood basins in conjunction with modelling software that allows observers to calculate the factor by which the floodplain expanded during two storm events. The idea is to divert higher floods flows into expandable areas of storage in the landscape.

=== Forest restoration for multiple benefits ===
Forest restoration can benefit both biodiversity and human livelihoods (eg. providing food, timber and medicinal products). Diverse, native tree species are also more likely to be resilient to climate change than plantation forests. Agricultural expansion has been the main driver of deforestation globally. Forest loss has been estimated at around 4.7 million ha per year in 2010–2020. Over the same period, Asia had the highest net gain of forest area followed by Oceania and Europe.

Forest restoration, as part of national development strategies, can help countries achieve sustainable development goals. For example, in Rwanda, the Rwanda Natural Resources Authority, World Resources Institute and IUCN began a program in 2015 for forest landscape restoration as a national priority. NBS approaches used were ecological restoration and ecosystem-based mitigation and the program was meant to address the following societal issues: food security, water security, disaster risk reduction. The Great Green Wall, a joint campaign among African countries to combat desertification launched in 2007.

== Implementation ==
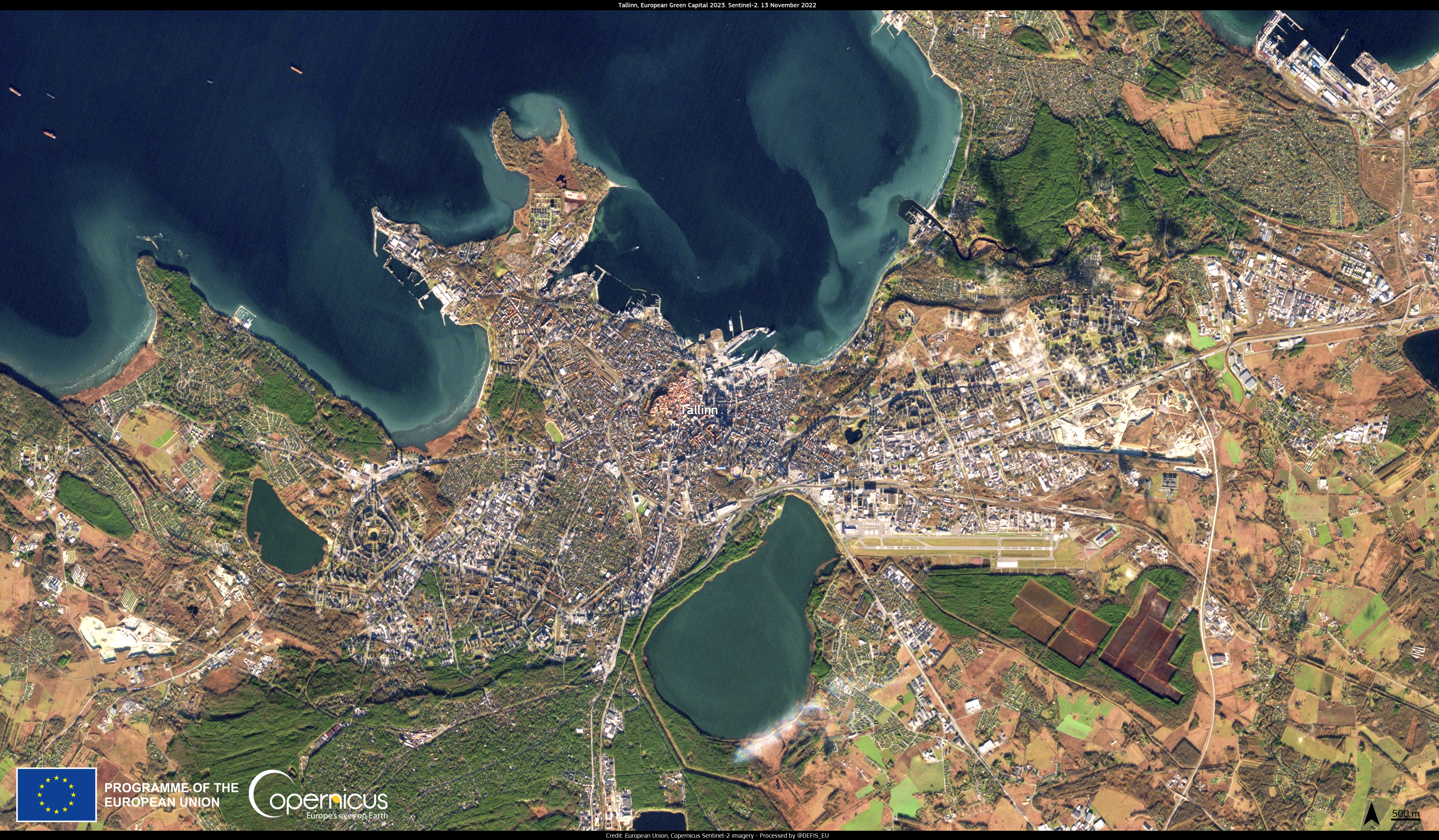
Example of a city that uses nature-based solutions: Tallinn, the capital of Estonia, has been designated as the European Green Capital 2023 in recognition of its efforts to promote sustainable transport, green economy and environmental conservation.

=== Guidance for effective implementation ===
A number of studies and reports have proposed principles and frameworks to guide effective and appropriate implementation. One primary principle, for example, is that NBS seek to embrace, rather than replace, nature conservation norms. NBS can be implemented alone or in an integrated manner along with other solutions to societal challenges (e.g. technological and engineering solutions) and are applied at the landscape scale.

Researchers have pointed out that "instead of framing NBS as an alternative to engineered approaches, we should focus on finding synergies among different solutions".

The concept of NBS is gaining acceptance outside the conservation community (e.g. urban planning) and is now on its way to be mainstreamed into policies and programmes (climate change policy, law, infrastructure investment, and financing mechanisms), although NBS still face many implementation barriers and challenges.

Multiple case studies have demonstrated that NBS can be more economically viable than traditional technological infrastructures.

Implementation of NBS requires measures like adaptation of economic subsidy schemes, and the creation of opportunities for conservation finance, to name a few.

=== Using geographic information systems (GIS) ===
NBS are also determined by site-specific natural and cultural contexts that include traditional, local and scientific knowledge. Geographic information systems (GIS) can be used as an analysis tool to determine sites that may succeed as NBS. GIS can function in such a way that site conditions including slope gradients, water bodies, land use and soils are taken into account in analyzing for suitability. The resulting maps are often used in conjunction with historic flood maps to determine the potential of floodwater storage capacity on specific sites using 3D modeling tools.

=== Projects supported by the European Union ===
Since 2016, the EU has supported a multi-stakeholder dialogue platform (ThinkNature) to promote the co-design, testing, and deployment of improved and innovative NBS in an integrated way. The creation of such science-policy-business-society interfaces could promote market uptake of NBS. The project was part of the EU's Horizon 2020 Research and Innovation programme, and ran for 3 years.

In 2017, as part of the Presidency of the Estonian Republic of the Council of the European Union, a conference called "Nature-based Solutions: From Innovation to Common-use" was organised by the Ministry of the Environment of Estonia and the University of Tallinn. This conference aimed to strengthen synergies among various recent initiatives and programs related to NBS, focusing on policy and governance of NBS, research, and innovation.

== Concerns ==
The Indigenous Environmental Network has stated that "Nature-based solutions (NBS) is a greenwashing tool that does not address the root causes of climate change." and "The legacy of colonial power continues through nature-based solutions." For example, NBS activities can involve converting non-forest land into forest plantations (for climate change mitigation) but this carries risks of climate injustice through taking land away from smallholders and pastoralists. A global evidence map of natural climate solutions identified 257,266 relevant papers across 22 pathways. Fewer than 2% of the papers explicitly mentioned cost, equity, or information about Indigenous peoples and local communities in their abstracts. The authors cautioned that their method could not detect cases where these issues were considered implicitly or were not mentioned in an abstract.

However, the IPCC pointed out that the term is "the subject of ongoing debate, with concerns that it may lead to the misunderstanding that NbS on its own can provide a global solution to climate change". To clarify this point further, the IPCC also stated that "nature-based systems cannot be regarded as an alternative to, or a reason to delay, deep cuts in GHG emissions".

The majority of case studies and examples of NBS are from the Global North, resulting in a lack of data for many medium- and low-income nations. Consequently, many ecosystems and climates are excluded from existing studies as well as cost analyses in these locations. Further research needs to be conducted in the Global South to determine the efficacy of NBS on climate, social and ecological standards.

== Related concepts ==
NBS is closely related to concepts like ecosystem approaches and ecological engineering. This includes concepts such as ecosystem-based adaptation and green infrastructure.

For instance, ecosystem-based approaches are increasingly promoted for climate change adaptation and mitigation by organisations like the United Nations Environment Programme and non-governmental organisations such as The Nature Conservancy. These organisations refer to "policies and measures that take into account the role of ecosystem services in reducing the vulnerability of society to climate change, in a multi-sectoral and multi-scale approach".

== See also ==
- Forest restoration – Actions to reinstate forest health
- Sustainability – Societal goal and normative concept
- Sustainable architecture – Architecture designed to minimize environmental impact
- Sustainable development – Mode of human development
- Tree planting – Process of transplanting tree seedlings
- Urban forestry – Care of trees in urban environments
