= Ecosystem-based disaster risk reduction =

Ecosystem-based disaster risk reduction (Eco-DRR) is based on disaster risk reduction (DRR) and the purpose of Eco-DRR is to prevent and reduce disasters by utilizing ecosystems. Eco-DRR is to maintain ecosystems and ecosystem services, to use them as buffer zones and buffers for dangerous natural phenomena, and to provide humans and local communities with functions such as food and water supply. Eco-DRR is closely related to Ecosystem-based adaptation (EbA), approaches to adapt to climate change. They all involve the management of ecosystems and their services to reduce the vulnerability of human communities to the impacts of climate change.

Evidence suggests that many ecosystems can benefit from sustainable, multi-factored strategies for Eco-DRR. However, disaster risk reduction research has tended to focus on urban areas of the Global North. More research is needed in coastal, dryland and watershed areas and the Global South.

== See also ==
- Climate change adaptation
- Climate change mitigation
- Disaster risk reduction
- Emergency management
- International Day for Disaster Reduction
- Natural disasters
- Nature-based solutions
- Risk management
