= John Isaiah Brauman =

American chemist (1937–2024)

- Born: September 7, 1937; Pittsburgh, Pennsylvania, U.S.
- Died: August 23, 2024 (aged 86)
- Education: Massachusetts Institute of Technology; University of California
- Occupation: Chemist
- Awards: ACS Award in pure chemistry (1973); Harrison Howe Award (1976); ACS Arthur C. Cope Scholar Award (1986); ACS James Flack Norris Award (1986); Linus Pauling Award (2002); National Medal of Science (2002); Willard Gibbs Award (2003)
- Website: chemistry.stanford.edu/people/john-brauman

John Isaiah Brauman (September 7, 1937 – August 23, 2024) was an American chemist.

== Biography ==
John Brauman was born in Pittsburgh on September 7, 1937. Brauman graduated from Taylor Allderdice High School in 1955. He obtained a bachelor's degree in 1959 from Massachusetts Institute of Technology and a Ph.D. from University of California at Berkeley in 1963 where his Ph.D. supervisor was Andrew Steitwieser. He was married to Sharon K. Brauman, also a chemist. Their daughter, Kate Brauman is the lead scientist for the Global Water Initiative at the University of Minnesota's Institute on the Environment.

On October 29, 2003, George W. Bush awarded the National Medal of Science to John Brauman, who at that time was the J.G. Jackson and C.J. Wood Professor of Chemistry at Stanford University. His research there concerned molecules reactions and the factors that determine the rates and products of chemical reactions. The main areas of research involved the spectroscopy, photochemistry, reaction dynamics, and reaction mechanisms of ions in the gas phase.

Brauman died on August 23, 2024, at the age of 86.

== Awards and honors ==
- 1973 ACS Award in pure chemistry
- 1976 Harrison Howe Award, and awards from American Academy of Arts and Sciences, National Academy of Sciences, and Dean's Award for distinguished teaching
- 1978-1979 He was a Guggenheim fellow
- 1986 ACS Arthur C. Cope Scholar Award
- 1986 ACS James Flack Norris Award in Physical Organic Chemistry
- 1986 R.C. Fuson Award
- 1991 He became an honorary fellow of California Academy of Sciences
- 2001 Awarded the National Academy of Sciences Award in chemical sciences.
- 2002 Awarded the National Medal of Science and the Linus Pauling Award.
- 2003 Willard Gibbs Award.
- 2017, Charles Lathrop Parsons Award for Public Service, American Chemical Society

== Works ==
Examples of Professor Brauman's publications include:

- E.A. Brinkman; S. Berger; J. Marks; J.I. Brauman (1993). "Molecular Rotation and the Observation of Dipole-Bound States of Anions". Journal of Chemical Physics. 99 (10). J. Chem. Phys.: 7586–7594. Bibcode:1993JChPh..99.7586B. doi:10.1063/1.465688.
- S.L. Craig; J.I. Brauman (1997). "Perturbed Equilibria and Statistical Energy Redistribution in a Gas Phase SN2 Reaction". Science. 276 (5318): 1536–1538. doi:10.1126/science.276.5318.1536.
- B.C. Römer; J.I. Brauman (1997). "Electron Photodetachment Spectroscopy of (E)- and (Z)-Propionaldehyde Enolate Anions. Electron Affinities of the Stereoisomers of Propionaldehyde Enolate Radicals". 119. J. Am. Chem. Soc.: 2054–2055.
- M.L. Chabinyc; S.L. Craig; C.K. Regan; J.I. Brauman (1998). "Gas-Phase Ionic Reactions: Dynamics and Mechanism of Nucleophilic Displacements". Science. 279 (5358): 1882–1886. Bibcode:1998Sci...279.1882C. doi:10.1126/science.279.5358.1882. PMID 9506930.
- M.L. Chabinyc; J.I. Brauman (1998). "Acidity, Basicity, and the Stability of Hydrogen Bonds: Complexes of RO- + HCF3". 120. J. Am. Chem. Soc.: 10863–10870.
- S.L. Craig; M. Zhong; J.I. Brauman (1999). "Translational Energy Dependence and Potential Energy Surfaces of Gas Phase SN2 and Addition-Elimination Reactions". 121. J. Am. Chem. Soc.: 11790–11797.
- S.L. Craig; J.I. Brauman (1999). "Intramolecular Microsolvation of SN2 Transition States". 121. J. Am. Chem. Soc.: 6690–6699.
- M.L. Chabinyc; J.I. Brauman (2000). "Hydrogen Bonded Complexes of Methanol and Acetylides. Structure and Energy Correlations". 122. J. Am. Chem. Soc.: 5371–5378.
- G.A. Janaway; J.I. Brauman (2000). "Direct Observation of Spin Forbidden Proton Transfer Reactions: 3NO- + HA ->1HNO + A". 104. J. Phys. Chem. A: 1795–1798.
