= Ecosystem service =

Benefits provided by intact ecosystems

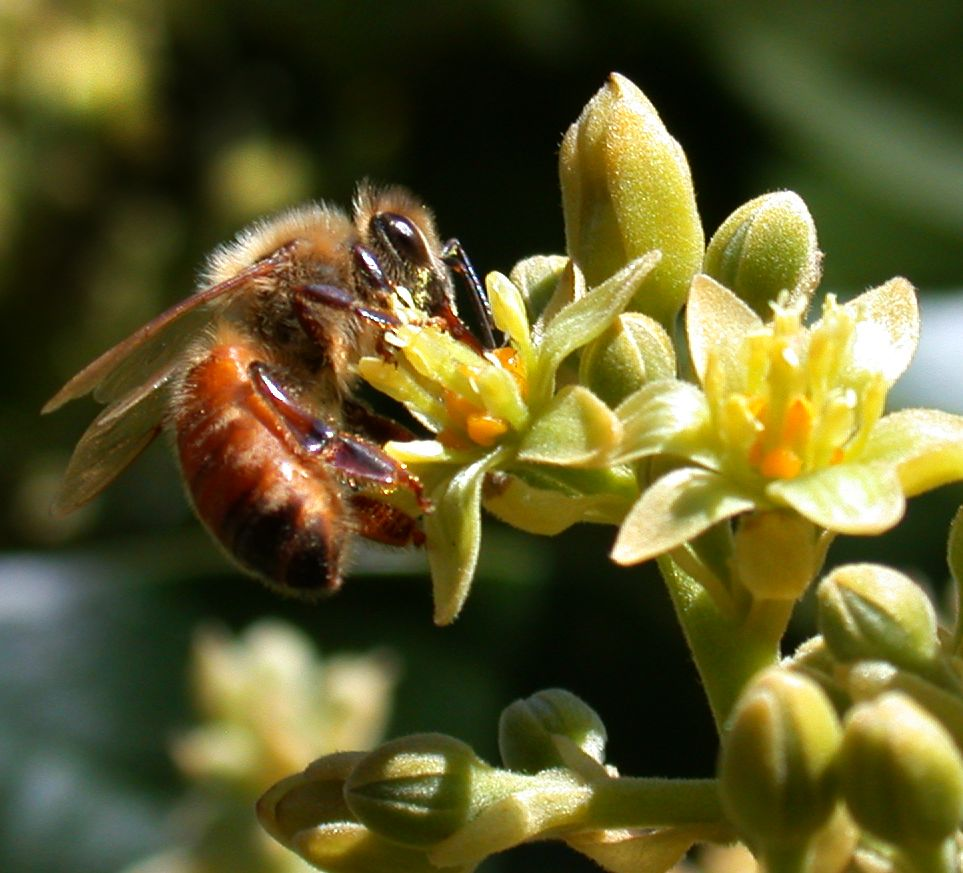
An example of an ecosystem service is pollination, here by a honey bee on avocado crop.

Ecosystem services are the various benefits that humans derive from ecosystems. The interconnected living and non-living components of the natural environment offer benefits such as pollination of crops, clean air and water, decomposition of wastes, and flood control. Ecosystem services are vital for human well-being. They provide direct and indirect benefits from nature, such as clean water, food, and climate regulation.

Ecosystem services are grouped into categories of services, which was popularized in the early 2000s by the Millennium Ecosystem Assessment (MA) initiative by the United Nations. How these groups are defined varies dependent on classification system. The MA groups the services into four broad categories of services. These are provisioning services, such as the production of food and water; regulating services, such as the control of climate and disease; supporting services, such as nutrient cycles and oxygen production; and cultural services, such as recreation, tourism, and spiritual gratification.

For example, estuarine and coastal ecosystems are marine ecosystems that perform the four categories of ecosystem services in several ways. Firstly, their provisioning services include marine resources and genetic resources. Secondly, their supporting services include nutrient cycling and primary production. Thirdly, their regulating services include carbon sequestration (which helps with climate change mitigation) and flood control. Lastly, their cultural services include recreation and tourism. Evaluations of ecosystem services may include assigning an economic value to them.

== Definition ==
Ecosystem services or eco-services are defined as the goods and services provided by ecosystems to humans. Per the 2006 Millennium Ecosystem Assessment (MA), ecosystem services are defined as "the benefits people obtain from ecosystems".

While Gretchen Daily's original definition distinguished between ecosystem goods and ecosystem services, Robert Costanza and colleagues' later work and that of the MA lumped all of these together as ecosystem services.

== Categories ==
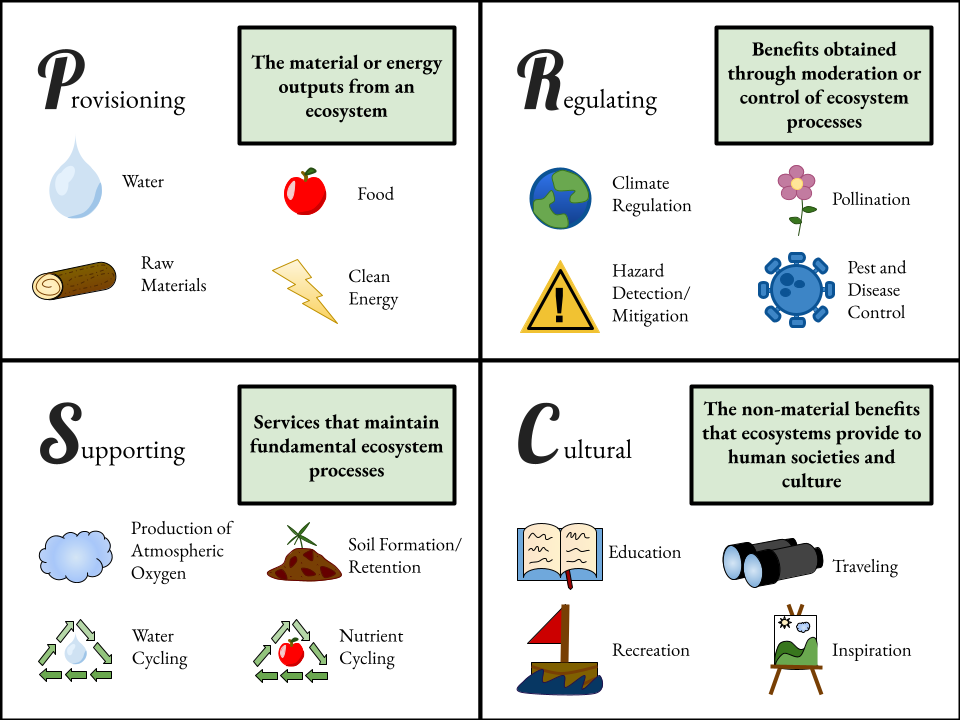
Four categories of ecosystem services

The categorisation of ecosystem services varies depending on classification system. The Millennium Ecosystem Assessment (MA) groups the services into the four groups: regulating services, provisioning services, cultural services and supporting services, where the so-called supporting services are regarded as the basis for the services of the other three categories.

An ecosystem does not necessarily offer all four types of services simultaneously; but given the intricate nature of any ecosystem, it is usually assumed that humans benefit from a combination of these services. The services offered by diverse types of ecosystems (forests, seas, coral reefs, mangroves, pasturelands, etc.) differ in nature and in consequence. In fact, some services directly affect the livelihood of neighboring human populations (such as fresh water, food or aesthetic value, etc.) while other services affect general environmental conditions by which humans are indirectly impacted (such as climate change, erosion regulation or natural hazard regulation, etc.).

By 2010, there had evolved various working definitions and descriptions of ecosystem services in the literature. To prevent double-counting in ecosystem services audits, for instance, The Economics of Ecosystems and Biodiversity replaced Supporting Services in the MA with Habitat Services, and "ecosystem functions", defined as "a subset of the interactions between ecosystem structure and processes that underpin the capacity of an ecosystem to provide goods and services". This was further developed by the Common International Classification for Ecosystem Services, which uses the categories of Cultural and Provisioning, but combines Regulatory and Habitat services into the category Regulation and maintenance services.

=== Provisioning services ===
Provisioning services consist of all "the products obtained from ecosystems". The following services are also known as ecosystem goods:

- food (including seafood and game), crops, wild foods, and spices
- raw materials (including lumber, skins, fuelwood, organic matter, fodder, and fertilizer)
- genetic resources (including crop improvement genes, and health care)
- biogenic minerals
- medicinal resources (including pharmaceuticals, chemical models, and test and assay organisms)
- energy (hydropower, biomass fuels)
- ornamental resources (including fashion, handicrafts, jewelry, pets, worship, decoration, and souvenirs like furs, feathers, ivory, orchids, butterflies, aquarium fish, shells, etc.)

==== Products from forests ====
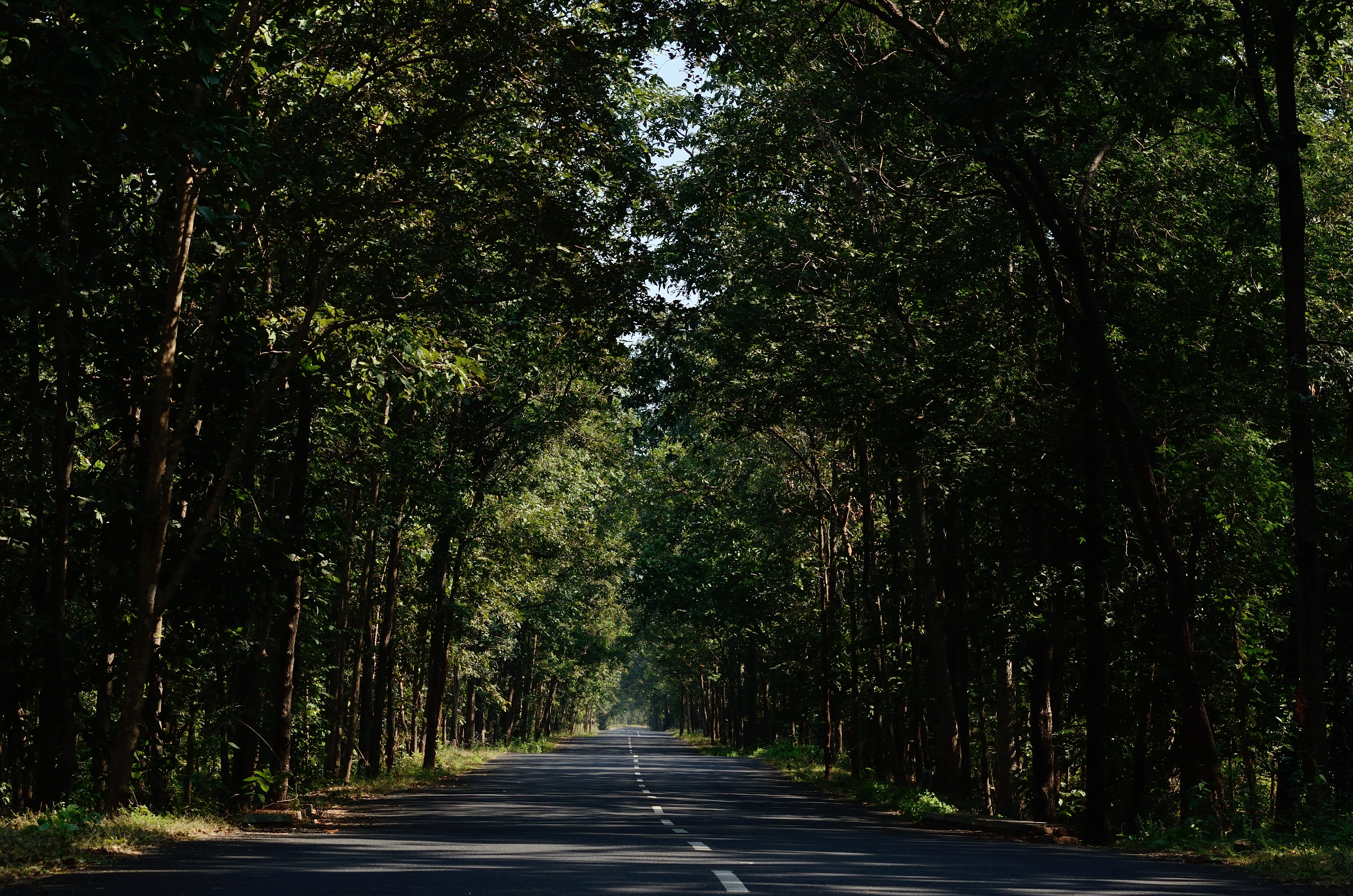
Social forestry in Andhra Pradesh, India, providing fuel, soil protection, shade, and even well-being to travelers.

Forests and forest management produce a large type and variety of timber products, including roundwood, sawnwood, panels, and engineered wood, e.g., cross-laminated timber, as well as pulp and paper. Besides the production of timber, forestry activities may also result in products that undergo little processing, such as fire wood, charcoal, wood chips and roundwood used in an unprocessed form. Global production and trade of all major wood-based products recorded their highest ever values in 2018. Production, imports and exports of roundwood, sawnwood, wood-based panels, wood pulp, wood charcoal and pellets reached their maximum quantities since 1947 when FAO started reporting global forest product statistics. In 2018, growth in production of the main wood-based product groups ranged from 1 percent (wood-based panels) to 5 percent (industrial roundwood). The fastest growth occurred in the Asia-Pacific, Northern American and European regions, likely due to positive economic growth in these areas. Over 40% of the territory in the European Union is covered by forests. This region has grown via afforestation by roughly 0.4% year in recent decades. In the European Union, just 60% of the yearly forest growth is harvested.

Forests also provide non-wood forest products, including fodder, aromatic and medicinal plants, and wild foods. Worldwide, around 1 billion people depend to some extent on wild foods such as wild meat, edible insects, edible plant products, mushrooms and fish, which often contain high levels of key micronutrients. The value of forest foods as a nutritional resource is not limited to low- and middle-income countries; more than 100 million people in the European Union (EU) regularly consume wild food. Some 2.4 billion people – in both urban and rural settings – use wood-based energy for cooking.

=== Regulating services ===
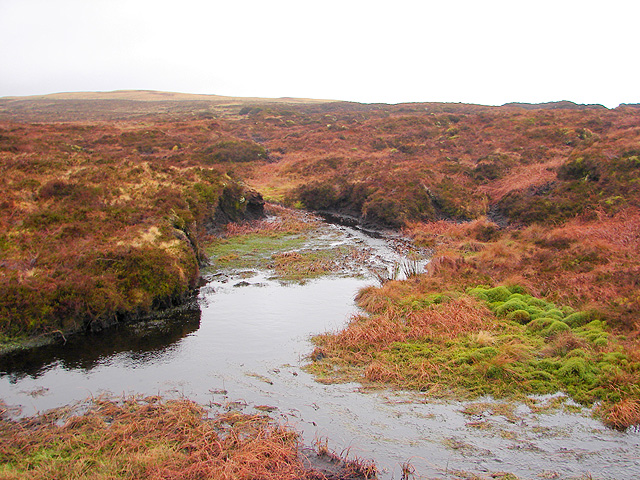
Upland bog in Wales, forming the official source of the River Severn. Healthy bogs sequester carbon, hold back water thereby reducing flood risk, and supply cleaned water better than degraded habitats do.

Regulating services are the "benefits obtained from the regulation of ecosystem processes". These include:

- Purification of water and air
- Carbon sequestration (this contributes to climate change mitigation)
- Waste decomposition and detoxification
- Predation regulates prey populations
- Biological control pest and disease control
- Pollination
- Disturbance regulation, i.e. flood protection

==== Water purification ====
An example for water purification as an ecosystem service is as follows: In New York City, where the quality of drinking water had fallen below standards required by the U.S. Environmental Protection Agency (EPA), authorities opted to restore the polluted Catskill Watershed that had previously provided the city with the ecosystem service of water purification. Once the input of sewage and pesticides to the watershed area was reduced, natural abiotic processes such as soil absorption and filtration of chemicals, together with biotic recycling via root systems and soil microorganisms, water quality improved to levels that met government standards. The cost of this investment in natural capital was estimated at $1–1.5 billion, which contrasted dramatically with the estimated $6–8 billion cost of constructing a water filtration plant plus the $300 million annual running costs.

==== Pollination ====
Pollination of crops by bees is required for 15–30% of U.S. food production; most large-scale farmers import non-native honey bees to provide this service. A 2005 study reported that in California's agricultural region, it was found that wild bees alone could provide partial or complete pollination services or enhance the services provided by honey bees through behavioral interactions. However, intensified agricultural practices can quickly erode pollination services through the loss of species. The remaining species are unable to compensate this. The results of this study also indicate that the proportion of chaparral and oak-woodland habitat available for wild bees within 1–2 km of a farm can stabilize and enhance the provision of pollination services. The presence of such ecosystem elements functions almost like an insurance policy for farmers.

Another way to increase pollination services is to increase the amount of native flowering plants available for wild bees can forage on. This can be done by planting specific flowers in urban areas nearby, or even on the farm itself.

==== Buffer zones ====
Coastal and estuarine ecosystems act as buffer zones against natural hazards and environmental disturbances, such as floods, cyclones, tidal surges and storms. The role they play is to "[absorb] a portion of the impact and thus [lessen] its effect on the land". Wetlands (which include saltwater swamps, salt marshes, ...) and the vegetation it supports – trees, root mats, etc. – retain large amounts of water (surface water, snowmelt, rain, groundwater) and then slowly releases them back, decreasing the likeliness of floods. Mangrove forests protect coastal shorelines from tidal erosion or erosion by currents; a process that was studied after the 1999 cyclone that hit India. Villages that were surrounded with mangrove forests encountered less damages than other villages that were not protected by mangroves.

=== Supporting services ===
Supporting services are the services that allow for the other ecosystem services to be present. They have indirect impacts on humans that last over a long period of time. Several services can be considered as being both supporting services and regulating/cultural/provisioning services.

Supporting services include for example nutrient cycling, primary production, soil formation, habitat provision. These services make it possible for the ecosystems to continue providing services such as food supply, flood regulation, and water purification.

==== Nutrient cycling ====
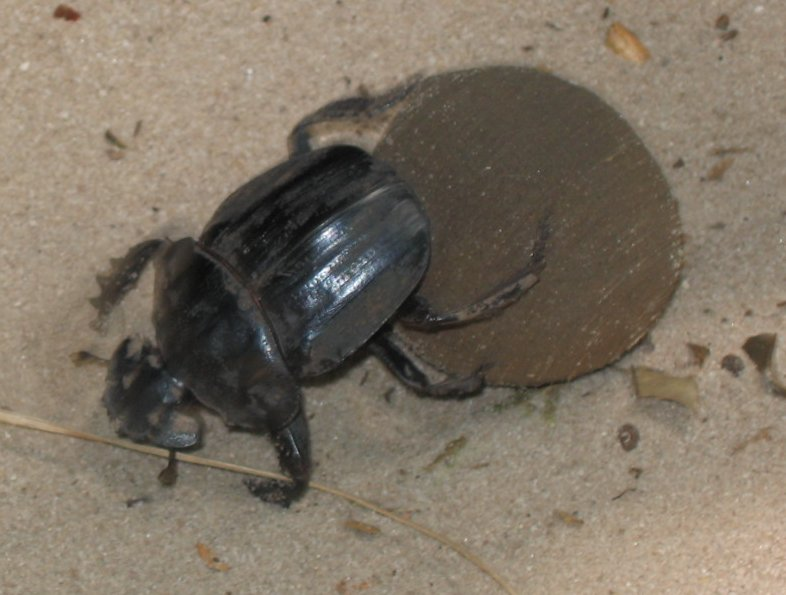
Detritivores like this dung beetle help to turn animal wastes into organic material that can be reused by primary producers.

Nutrient cycling is the movement of nutrients through an ecosystem by biotic and abiotic processes. The ocean is a vast storage pool for these nutrients, such as carbon, nitrogen and phosphorus. The nutrients are absorbed by the basic organisms of the marine food web and are thus transferred from one organism to the other and from one ecosystem to the other. Nutrients are recycled through the life cycle of organisms as they die and decompose, releasing the nutrients into the neighboring environment. "The service of nutrient cycling eventually impacts all other ecosystem services as all living things require a constant supply of nutrients to survive".

==== Primary production ====
Primary production refers to the production of organic matter, i.e., chemically bound energy, through processes such as photosynthesis and chemosynthesis. The organic matter produced by primary producers forms the basis of all food webs. Further, it generates oxygen (O2), a molecule necessary to sustain animals and humans. On average, a human consumes about 550 liter of oxygen per day, whereas plants produce 1,5 liter of oxygen per 10 grams of growth.

=== Cultural services ===
Cultural services relate to the non-material world, as they benefit recreational, aesthetic, cognitive and spiritual activities, which are not easily quantifiable in monetary terms. They include:

- cultural (including use of nature as motif in books, film, painting, folklore, national symbols, advertising, etc.)
- spiritual and historical (including use of nature for religious or heritage value or natural)
- recreational experiences (including ecotourism, outdoor sports, and recreation)
- science and education (including use of natural systems for school excursions, and scientific discovery)
- therapeutic (including eco-therapy, social forestry and animal assisted therapy)

As of 2012, there was a discussion as to how the concept of cultural ecosystem services could be operationalized, how landscape aesthetics, cultural heritage, outdoor recreation, and spiritual significance to define can fit into the ecosystem services approach. who vote for models that explicitly link ecological structures and functions with cultural values and benefits. Likewise, there has been a fundamental critique of the concept of cultural ecosystem services that builds on three arguments:

1. Pivotal cultural values attaching to the natural/cultivated environment rely on an area's unique character that cannot be addressed by methods that use universal scientific parameters to determine ecological structures and functions.
2. If a natural/cultivated environment has symbolic meanings and cultural values the object of these values are not ecosystems but shaped phenomena like mountains, lakes, forests, and, mainly, symbolic landscapes.
3. Cultural values do result not from properties produced by ecosystems but are the product of a specific way of seeing within the given cultural framework of symbolic experience.

The Common International Classification of Ecosystem Services is a classification scheme developed to accounting systems (like National counts etc.), in order to avoid double-counting of Supporting Services with others Provisioning and Regulating Services.

==== Recreation and tourism ====
Sea sports are very popular among coastal populations: surfing, snorkeling, whale watching, kayaking, recreational fishing ... a lot of tourists also travel to resorts close to the sea or rivers or lakes to be able to experience these activities, and relax near the water. Additionally, the United Nation’s Sustainable Development Goal 14 has made efforts toward enhancing the use of ecosystem services for sustainable tourism especially in Small Island Developing States.

== Estuarine and coastal ecosystem services ==
Estuarine and marine coastal ecosystems are both marine ecosystems. Together, these ecosystems perform the four categories of ecosystem services in a variety of ways: The provisioning services include forest products, marine products, fresh water, raw materials, biochemical and genetic resources. Regulating services include carbon sequestration (contributing to climate change mitigation) as well as waste treatment and disease regulation and buffer zones. Supporting services of coastal ecosystems include nutrient cycling, biologically mediated habitats and primary production. Cultural services of coastal ecosystems include inspirational aspects, recreation and tourism, science and education.

Coasts and their adjacent areas on and offshore are an important part of a local ecosystem. The mixture of fresh water and salt water (brackish water) in estuaries provides many nutrients for marine life. Salt marshes, mangroves and beaches also support a diversity of plants, animals and insects crucial to the food chain. The high level of biodiversity creates a high level of biological activity, which has attracted human activity for thousands of years. Coasts also create essential material for organisms to live by, including estuaries, wetland, seagrass, coral reefs, and mangroves. Coasts provide habitats for migratory birds, sea turtles, marine mammals, and coral reefs.

== Assessment and modelling ==
The impacts of human activities on ecosystem services can be examined through Life-cycle assessment (LCA), which evaluates environmental pressures associated with industry production processes. Impact assessments methods developed for LCA link pressures such as land-use change and eutrophication to changes in ecological functions and ecosystem services.

A 2026 review of ecosystem service models for LCA distinguished three main approaches: land-use impact models, extended ecosystem quality models, and inventory-based models. The review found that these approaches differ in the coverage of services and ecosystems, the indicators used, and whether they account for ecosystem service supply, demand, or both. Such differences limit comparability between models. Furthermore, freshwater and marine ecosystem services remain poorly represented. In summary, this highlights the need for more consistent methodological guidance.

== Economics ==
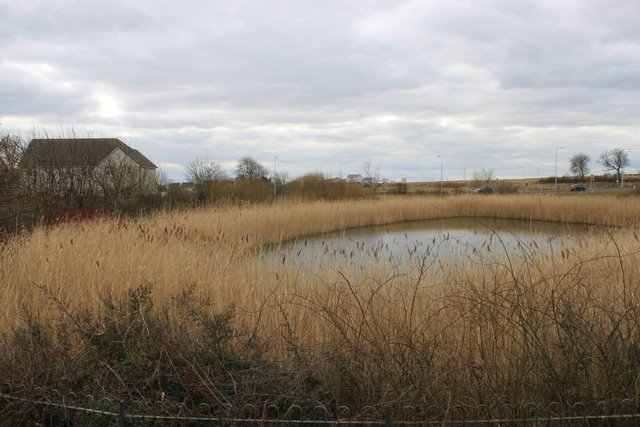
Sustainable urban drainage pond near housing in Scotland. The filtering and cleaning of surface and waste water by natural vegetation is a form of ecosystem service.

There are questions regarding the environmental and economic values of ecosystem services. Some people may be unaware of the environment in general and humanity's interrelatedness with the natural environment, which may cause misconceptions. Although environmental awareness is rapidly improving in our contemporary world, ecosystem capital and its flow are still poorly understood, threats continue to impose, and we suffer from the so-called 'tragedy of the commons'. Many efforts to inform decision-makers of current versus future costs and benefits now involve organizing and translating scientific knowledge to economics, which articulate the consequences of our choices in comparable units of impact on human well-being. An especially challenging aspect of this process is that interpreting ecological information collected from one spatial-temporal scale does not necessarily mean it can be applied at another; understanding the dynamics of ecological processes relative to ecosystem services is essential in aiding economic decisions. Weighting factors such as a service's irreplaceability or bundled services can also allocate economic value such that goal attainment becomes more efficient.

The economic valuation of ecosystem services also involves social communication and information, areas that remain particularly challenging and are the focus of many researchers. In general, the idea is that although individuals make decisions for any variety of reasons, trends reveal the aggregated preferences of a society, from which the economic value of services can be inferred and assigned. The six major methods for valuing ecosystem services in monetary terms are:

- Avoided cost: Services allow society to avoid costs that would have been incurred in the absence of those services (e.g. waste treatment by wetland habitats avoids health costs)
- Replacement cost: Services could be replaced with human-made systems (e.g. restoration of the Catskill Watershed cost less than the construction of a water purification plant)
- Factor income: Services provide for the enhancement of incomes (e.g. improved water quality increases the commercial take of a fishery and improves the income of fishers)
- Travel cost: Service demand may require travel, whose costs can reflect the implied value of the service (e.g. value of ecotourism experience is at least what a visitor is willing to pay to get there)
- Hedonic pricing: Service demand may be reflected in the prices people will pay for associated goods (e.g. coastal housing prices exceed that of inland homes)
- Contingent valuation: Service demand may be elicited by posing hypothetical scenarios that involve some valuation of alternatives (e.g. visitors willing to pay for increased access to national parks)

A peer-reviewed study published in 1997 estimated the value of the world's ecosystem services and natural capital to be between US$16 and $54 trillion per year, with an average of US$33 trillion per year. However, Salles (2011) indicated 'The total value of biodiversity is infinite, so having debate about what is the total value of nature is actually pointless because we can't live without it'.

As of 2012, many companies were not fully aware of the extent of their dependence and impact on ecosystems and the possible ramifications. Likewise, environmental management systems and environmental due diligence tools are more suited to handle "traditional" issues of pollution and natural resource consumption. Most focus on environmental impacts, not dependence. Several tools and methodologies can help the private sector value and assess ecosystem services, including Our Ecosystem, the 2008 Corporate Ecosystem Services Review, the Artificial Intelligence for Environment & Sustainability (ARIES) project from 2007, the Natural Value Initiative (2012) and InVEST (Integrated Valuation of Ecosystem Services & Tradeoffs, 2012)

To provide an example of a cost comparison: The land of the United States Department of Defense is said to provide substantial ecosystem services to local communities, including benefits to carbon storage, resiliency to climate, and endangered species habitat. As of 2020, the Eglin Air Force Base is said to provide about $110 million in ecosystem services per year, $40 million more than if no base was present.

=== Payments ===
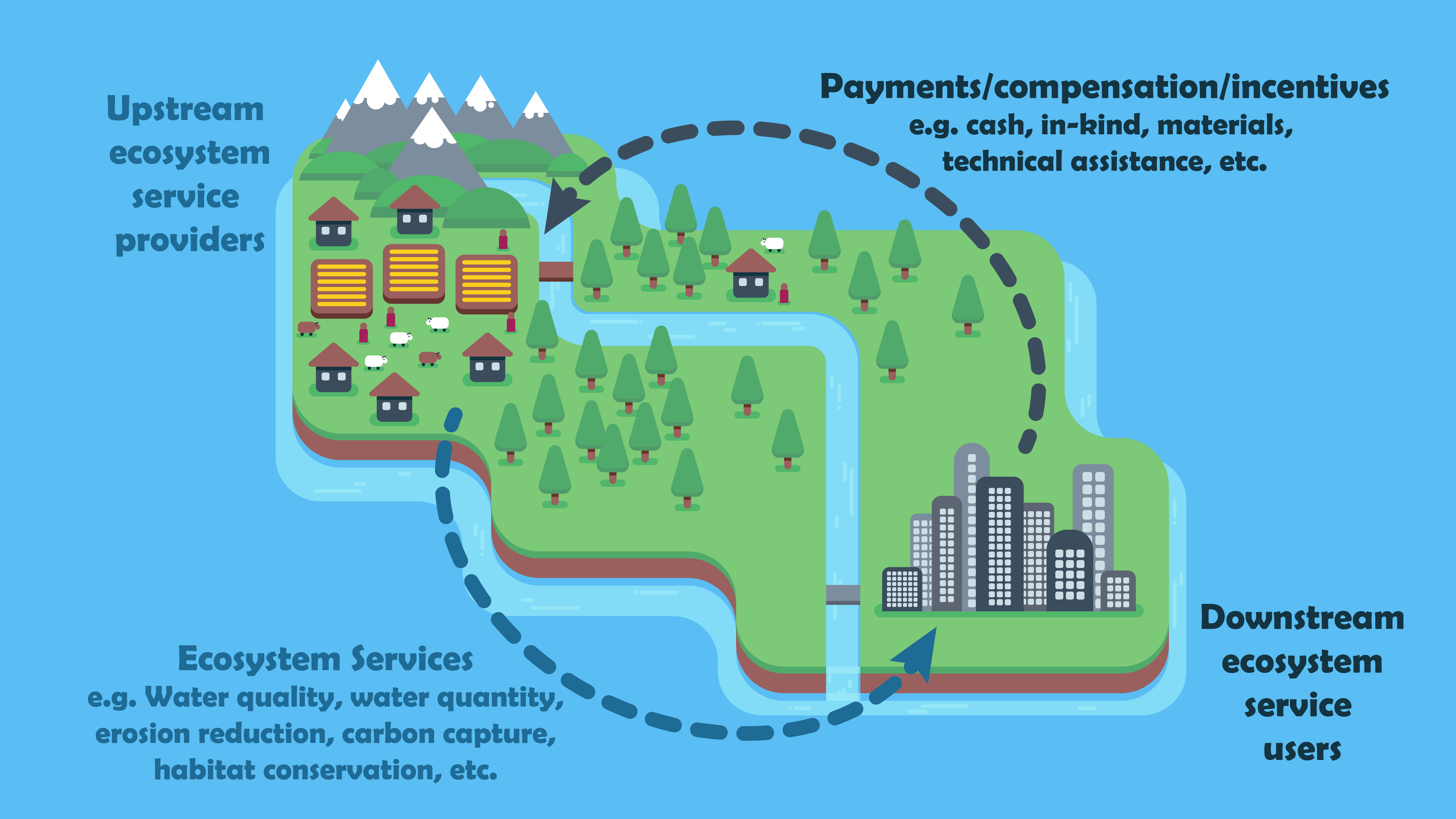
Payments for Ecosystem Services (PES)

Payments for ecosystem services (PES), also known as payments for environmental services (or benefits), are incentives offered to farmers or landowners in exchange for managing their land to provide some sort of ecological service. They have been defined as "a transparent system for the additional provision of environmental services through conditional payments to voluntary providers". These programmes promote the conservation of natural resources in the marketplace.

==== Innovative payment for ecosystem services ====
In northern Laos, a participatory and equity focused payment for ecosystem services enabled 315 smallholder families to adopt silvopastoral systems. The initiative, which was co-designed with farmers and local authorities, addressed soil erosion and loss of ecosystem services undermining farm productivity. By combining incentives, research-based decision support tools, and strengthening native seed systems, the model provides a scalable pathway for climate-resilient agriculture and sustainable livelihoods.

== Management and policy ==
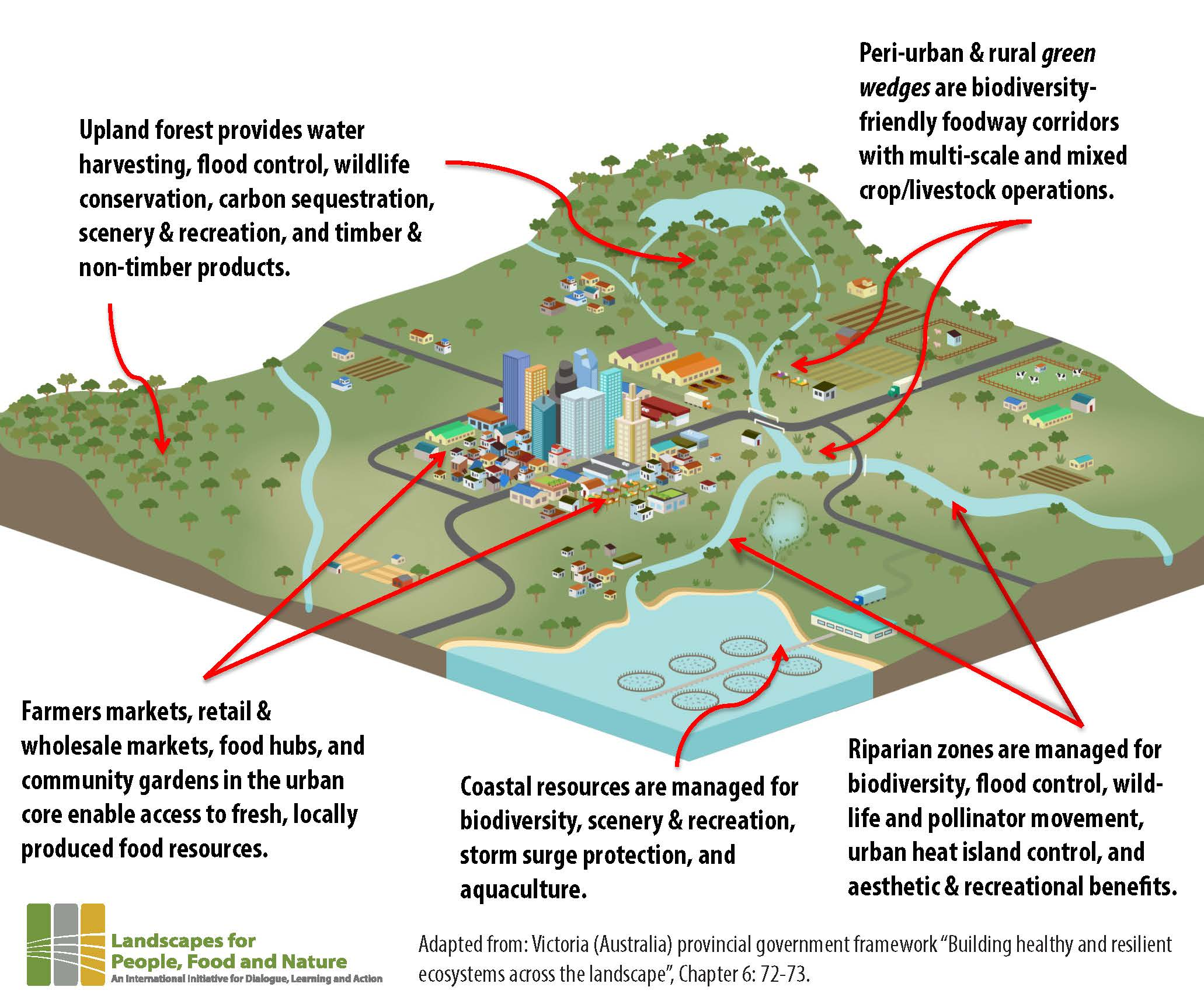
Ecosystem services in urban and rural areas

Although monetary pricing continues with respect to the valuation of ecosystem services, the challenges in policy implementation and management are significant and considerable. The administration of common pool resources has been a subject of extensive academic pursuit. From defining the problems to finding solutions that can be applied in practical and sustainable ways, there is much to overcome. Considering options must balance present and future human needs, and decision-makers must frequently work from valid but incomplete information. Existing legal policies are often considered insufficient since they typically pertain to human health-based standards that are mismatched with necessary means to protect ecosystem health and services. In 2000, to improve the information available, the implementation of an Ecosystem Services Framework has been suggested (ESF), which integrates the biophysical and socio-economic dimensions of protecting the environment and is designed to guide institutions through multidisciplinary information and jargon, helping to direct strategic choices.

As of 2005 Local to regional collective management efforts were considered appropriate for services like crop pollination or resources like water. Another approach that has become increasingly popular during the 1990s is the marketing of ecosystem services protection. Payment and trading of services is an emerging worldwide small-scale solution where one can acquire credits for activities such as sponsoring the protection of carbon sequestration sources or the restoration of ecosystem service providers. In some cases, banks for handling such credits have been established and conservation companies have even gone public on stock exchanges, defining an evermore parallel link with economic endeavors and opportunities for tying into social perceptions. However, crucial for implementation are clearly defined land rights, which are often lacking in many developing countries. In particular, many forest-rich developing countries suffering deforestation experience conflict between different forest stakeholders. In addition, concerns for such global transactions include inconsistent compensation for services or resources sacrificed elsewhere and misconceived warrants for irresponsible use. As of 2001, another approach focused on protecting ecosystem service biodiversity hotspots. Recognition that the conservation of many ecosystem services aligns with more traditional conservation goals (i.e. biodiversity) has led to the suggested merging of objectives for maximizing their mutual success. This may be particularly strategic when employing networks that permit the flow of services across landscapes, and might also facilitate securing the financial means to protect services through a diversification of investors.

For example, as of 2013, there had been interest in the valuation of ecosystem services provided by shellfish production and restoration. A keystone species, low in the food chain, bivalve shellfish such as oysters support a complex community of species by performing a number of functions essential to the diverse array of species that surround them. There is also increasing recognition that some shellfish species may impact or control many ecological processes; so much so that they are included on the list of "ecosystem engineers"—organisms that physically, biologically or chemically modify the environment around them in ways that influence the health of other organisms. Many of the ecological functions and processes performed or affected by shellfish contribute to human well-being by providing a stream of valuable ecosystem services over time by filtering out particulate materials and potentially mitigating water quality issues by controlling excess nutrients in the water. As of 2018, the concept of ecosystem services had not been properly implemented into international and regional legislation yet.

Notwithstanding, the United Nations Sustainable Development Goal 15 has a target to ensure the conservation, restoration, and sustainable use of ecosystem services.

An estimated $125 trillion to $140 trillion is added to the economy each year by all ecosystem services. However, many of these services are at risk due to climate and other anthropogenic impacts. Climate-driven shifts in biome ranges is expected to cause a 9% decline in ecosystem services on average at global scale by 2100

=== Ecosystem-based adaptation (EbA) ===
Ecosystem-based adaptation (EbA) encompasses a broad set of approaches to adapt to climate change. They all involve the management of ecosystems and their services to reduce the vulnerability of human communities to the impacts of climate change. The Convention on Biological Diversity (CBD) defines EBA as "the use of biodiversity and ecosystem services as part of an overall adaptation strategy to help people to adapt to the adverse effects of climate change".

EbA involves the conservation, sustainable management and restoration of ecosystems, such as forests, grasslands, wetlands, mangroves or coral reefs to reduce the harmful impacts of climate hazards including shifting patterns or levels of rainfall, changes in maximum and minimum temperatures, stronger storms, and increasingly variable climatic conditions. EbA measures can be implemented on their own or in combination with engineered approaches (such as the construction of water reservoirs or dykes), hybrid measures (such as artificial reefs) and approaches that strengthen the capacities of individuals and institutions to address climate risks (such as the introduction of early warning systems).

=== Land use change decisions ===
Ecosystem services decisions require making complex choices at the intersection of ecology, technology, society, and the economy. The process of making ecosystem services decisions must consider the interaction of many types of information, honor all stakeholder viewpoints, including regulatory agencies, proposal proponents, decision makers, residents, NGOs, and measure the impacts on all four parts of the intersection. These decisions are usually spatial, always multi-objective, and based on uncertain data, models, and estimates. Often it is the combination of the best science combined with the stakeholder values, estimates and opinions that drive the process.

One analytical study modeled the stakeholders as agents to support water resource management decisions in the Middle Rio Grande basin of New Mexico. This study focused on modeling the stakeholder inputs across a spatial decision, but ignored uncertainty. Another study used Monte Carlo methods to exercise econometric models of landowner decisions in a study of the effects of land-use change. Here the stakeholder inputs were modeled as random effects to reflect the uncertainty. A third study used a Bayesian decision support system to both model the uncertainty in the scientific information Bayes Nets and to assist collecting and fusing the input from stakeholders. This study was about siting wave energy devices off the Oregon Coast, but presents a general method for managing uncertain spatial science and stakeholder information in a decision making environment. Remote sensing data and analyses can be used to assess the health and extent of land cover classes that provide ecosystem services, which aids in planning, management, monitoring of stakeholders' actions, and communication between stakeholders.

In Baltic countries scientists, nature conservationists and local authorities are implementing integrated planning approach for grassland ecosystems. They are developing an integrated planning tool based on GIS (geographic information system) technology and put online that will help for planners to choose the best grassland management solution for concrete grassland. It will look holistically at the processes in the countryside and help to find best grassland management solutions by taking into account both natural and socioeconomic factors of the particular site.

== History ==
While the notion of human dependence on Earth's ecosystems reaches to the start of Homo sapiens' existence, recognition of how ecosystems could provide complex services to humankind date back to at least Plato (c. 400 BC) who understood that deforestation could lead to soil erosion and the drying of springs. Modern ideas of ecosystem services probably began when Marsh challenged in 1864 the idea that Earth's natural resources are unbounded by pointing out changes in soil fertility in the Mediterranean. It was not until the late 1940s that three key authors—Henry Fairfield Osborn, Jr, William Vogt, and Aldo Leopold—promoted recognition of human dependence on the environment.

In 1956, Paul Sears drew attention to the critical role of the ecosystem in processing wastes and recycling nutrients. In 1970, Paul Ehrlich and Rosa Weigert called attention to "ecological systems" in their environmental science textbook and "the most subtle and dangerous threat to man's existence ... the potential destruction, by man's own activities, of those ecological systems upon which the very existence of the human species depends".

The term environmental services was introduced in a 1970 report of the Study of Critical Environmental Problems, which listed services including insect pollination, fisheries, climate regulation and flood control. In following years, variations of the term were used, but eventually 'ecosystem services' became the standard in scientific literature. The term 'natural capital' was first coined by E. F. Schumacher in 1973 in his book Small is Beautiful.

In the 1990's two seminal works were published: Nature's Service by Gretchen Daily, which had a significant influence on the conversation of ecosystem services, and The value of the world's ecosystem services and natural capital by Costanza et al., which was the first study attempting to put an economic value on ecosystem services.

The ecosystem services concept has continued to expand and includes socio-economic and conservation objectives.

== See also ==
- Blue carbon
- Diversity-function debate
- Earth Economics
- Ecological goods and services
- Ecosystem-based disaster risk reduction
- Intergovernmental Science-Policy Platform on Biodiversity and Ecosystem Services
- Natural capital
- Soil functions
- Nature Based Solutions
