= James Salzman =

American legal academic

- Education: Yale University (BA); Harvard University (JD)
- Occupations: Legal academic and author
- Title: Professor of Environmental Law

James Salzman (born 1963) is the Donald Bren Distinguished Professor of Environmental Law with joint appointments at the UCLA School of Law and the Bren School of Environmental Science and Management at the University of California, Santa Barbara.

Salzman graduated from Yale College and Harvard Law School, the first Harvard graduate to earn joint degrees in law and engineering. Prior to joining the University of California in 2015, he taught as a chaired distinguished professor with joint appointments to the environment and law schools at Duke University, as a visiting professor at Columbia, Harvard, Stanford and Yale, and at universities in Australia, China, Israel, Italy, Portugal and Sweden.

Publishing thirteen books and over 100 articles, his broad-ranging scholarship has addressed topics spanning drinking water, policy design, and creating markets for ecosystem services. His work has been translated into ten languages with over 115,000 article downloads around the globe. He has been the fifth most cited scholar in environmental law.

Prior to entering academia, he worked in Paris in the Environment Directorate of the Organization for Economic Cooperation and Development and in London as the European Environmental Manager for Johnson Wax. His honors include election as a Fellow of the UK Royal Geographical Society and of the American College of Environmental Lawyers, as well as appointments as a McMaster Fellow and Fulbright Senior Scholar in Australia, a Gilbert White Fellow at Resources for the Future, and a Bellagio Fellow at the Rockefeller Foundation, among others. Twice voted Professor of the Year at Duke, he has lectured on every continent.

He is the author of Drinking Water: A History, and a frequent commentator in the media on water issues. He has served on the United States Environmental Protection Agency's National Drinking Water Advisory Council and on the Environmental Protection Agency/United States Trade Representative's Trade and Environment Policy Advisory Committee. His bestselling book, Mine: How the Hidden Rules of Ownership Control Our Lives, was published in 2021 by Doubleday and positively reviewed in The New Yorker and New York Times, among many others. The Financial Times listed it as one of the five top nonfiction books of the year. His work on permitting reform with JB Ruhl, notably What Happens When the Green New Deal Meets the Old Green Laws and The Greens' Dilemma: Building Tomorrow's Infrastructure Today, features prominently in the 2025 bestseller, Abundance, by Ezra Klein and Derek Thompson.

== Selected publications ==
- What is the Emperor Wearing? The Secret Lives of Ecosystem Services, Pace Environmental Law Review 2011,
- The Next Generation of Trade and Environment Conflicts: The Rise of Green Industrial Policy, Northwestern University Law Review 2014
- Gaming the Past: The Theory and Practice of Historic Baselines in the Administrative State, Vanderbilt Law Review 2010
- Teaching Policy Instrument Choice in Environmental Law: The Five P's, Duke Environmental Law & Policy Forum 2013
