= Natural Capital Project =

Natural Capital Alliance
- Abbreviation: NatCap
- Formation: 2005
- Type: Research partnership
- Purpose: Integration of natural capital into policy, finance, and resource management
- Headquarters: Stanford University, California, United States
- Region served: Worldwide
- Members: 11 core members, hundreds of collaborating organizations
- Website: https://naturalcapitalalliance.stanford.edu/

The Natural Capital Alliance (known as NatCap, formerly the Natural Capital Project) is a collaboration between researchers, leaders, and professionals aimed at improving the well-being of all by motivating greater investments in nature. NatCap works with governments, banks, corporations, and communities to incorporate the values of nature into decision-making, using a systematic approach to mapping, modeling, and quantifying nature’s benefits. NatCap has a global network of hundreds of research and practitioner organizations in dozens of countries, and is influencing policy, finance and management decisions worldwide.

NatCap is led from a global hub at Stanford University in collaboration with The Nature Conservancy, World Wildlife Fund, the Stockholm Resilience Centre, the Beijer Institute of Ecological Economics, the Chinese Academy of Sciences, the University of Minnesota's NatCap TEEMs, Natural Capital Insights, the Gund Institute for Environment at the University of Vermont, the Asian Development Bank, and the Inter-American Development Bank. It was launched in 2005.

NatCap engages leaders in governments, corporations, universities and other non-profit organizations, and melds its research with initiatives that benefit both nature and the economy. Nature's value is measured in terms of specific benefits, such as human health, economic development, food security and culture. While NatCap's approach has garnered broad support, not everyone agrees with the methodology of putting a monetary value on nature.

The Natural Capital Alliance has developed a free, open-source software platform called InVEST® (Integrated Valuation of Ecosystem Services and Trade-offs). InVEST includes 20+ ecosystem service models for terrestrial, freshwater, marine and coastal ecosystems, and urban settings. InVEST is used in more than 185 countries to map and model valuable ecological resources, assess trade-offs in land- and water-use, and integrate both conservation and human development into investments.
