= Augusta Wilde, Lady Truro =

British noble (1801–1866)

The Right Honourable The Lady Truro
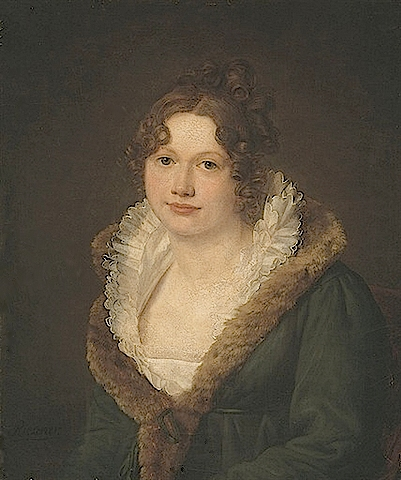

Personal details
- Born: 11 August 1801
- Died: 21 May 1866 (aged 64)
- Resting place: D'Este Mausoleum, St Laurence's Churchyard, Ramsgate
- Spouse: Thomas Wilde, 1st Baron Truro (m. 1845; died 1855)
- Parents: Prince Augustus Frederick, Duke of Sussex (father); Lady Augusta Murray (mother)

Augusta Emma Wilde, Lady Truro (née d'Este; 11 August 1801 – 21 May 1866) was the daughter of Prince Augustus Frederick, Duke of Sussex and Lady Augusta Murray. Her mother was the second daughter of John Murray, 4th Earl of Dunmore and Lady Charlotte Stewart.

== Family ==
Her parents were married in Rome and afterwards at St George's, Hanover Square. Following their father's death, Augusta's brother Augustus d’Este claimed the dukedom; but the House of Lords decided against the claim, on the grounds of the invalidity of the prince's marriage, it having been contracted without the consent of the Crown, as required by the Royal Marriages Act 1772.

In 1845, when she was 44 years old, she married as his second wife, Sir Thomas Wilde, later Baron Truro. Although Lord Truro had three surviving children by his first marriage, they had no children.

== Later life ==
Lady Truro had strong connections with Ramsgate, Kent, residing at Mount Albion House on the East Cliff. She owned a considerable amount of valuable property, mainly situated on the Mount Albion Estate.

In later years, Lady Truro suffered from severe bouts of asthma and usually spent the autumn on the continent. She returned to her town residence in Eaton Square, London, where she died suddenly on 21 May 1866, eleven years after her husband. The Thanet Advertiser remembered her as: "a lady of strict business habits, and rather reserved in manner, of exceedingly good general information, living, while at Ramsgate, in a very quiet and unostentatious way".

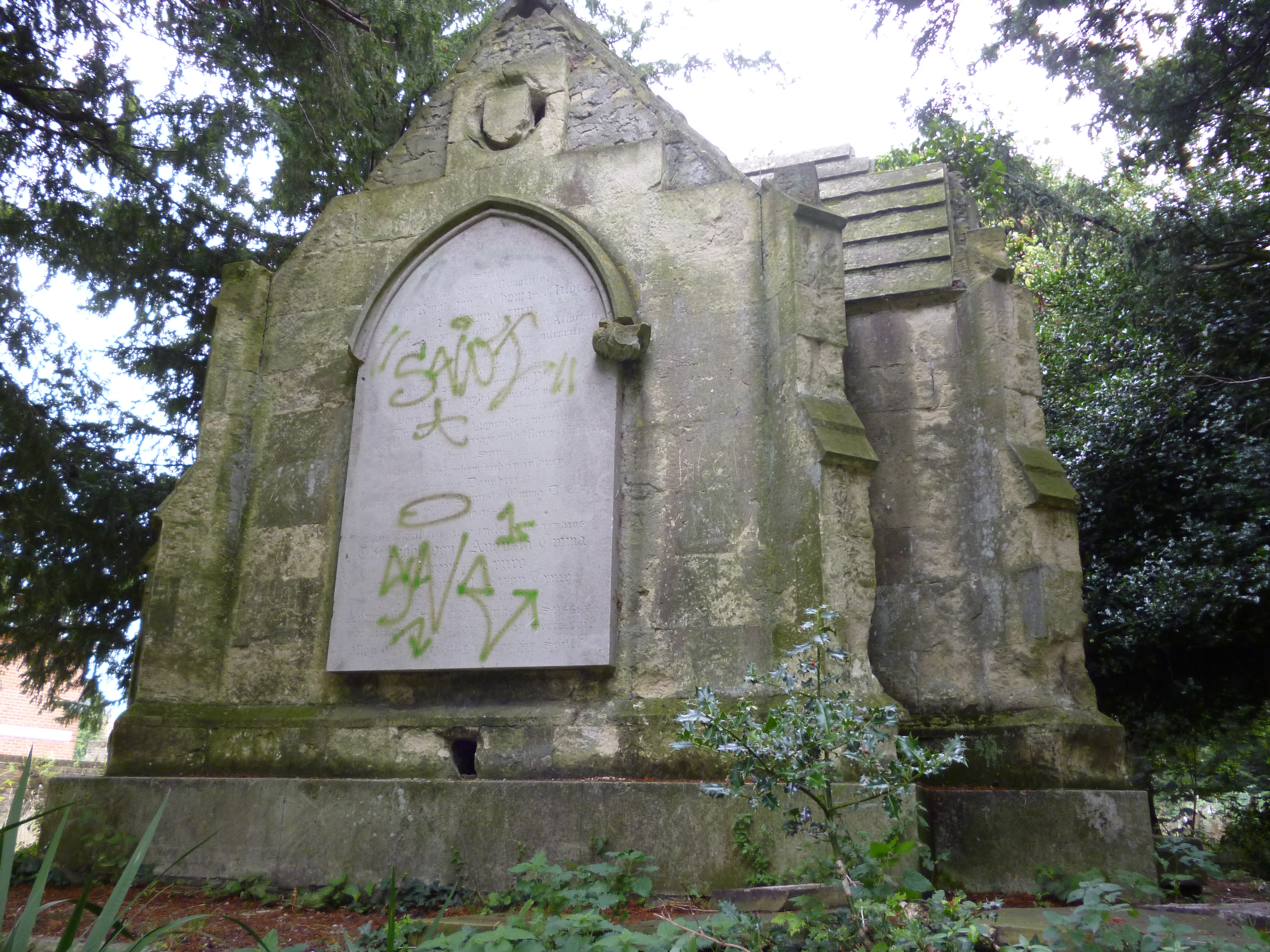
The d'Este Mausoleum, St Laurence's Church, Ramsgate.

The funeral took place on the afternoon of Monday 28 May 1866 at St Laurence's Church, Ramsgate. She is interred in the family mausoleum (Grade II listed). She left an estate valued at around £70,000, of which over £40,000 was left to charity.
