= Thomas Wilde =

Thomas Wilde may refer to:

- Thomas Wilde, 1st Baron Truro, British lawyer, judge and politician
- Thomas Wilde, 3rd Baron Truro, English cricketer and barrister
