= Lady Augusta Murray =

Scottish aristocrat (1761–1830)

Lady Augusta De Ameland
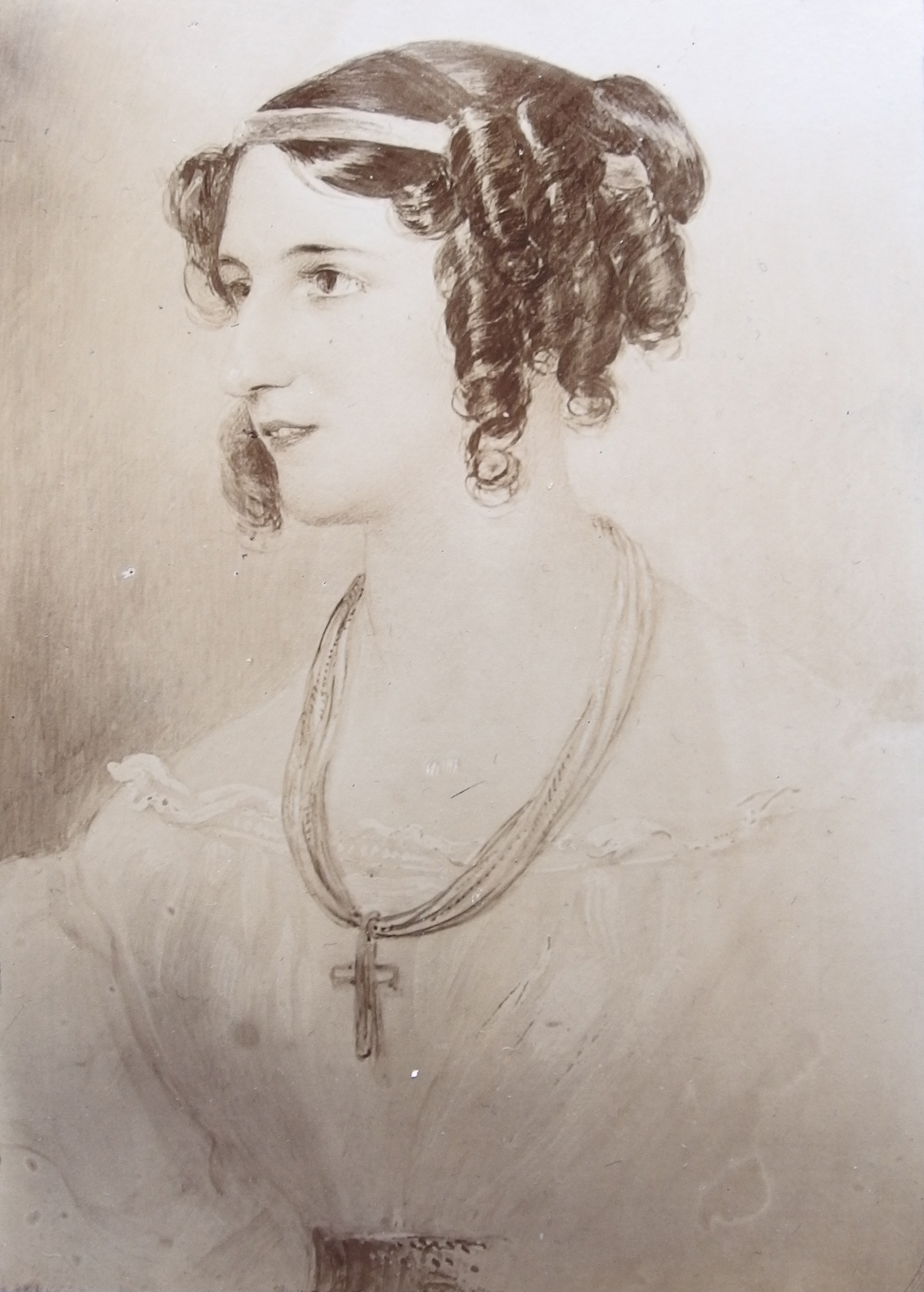
- Born: 27 January 1761; Scotland
- Died: 4 March 1830 (aged 69); Ramsgate, Kent, England
- Burial place: D'Este Mausoleum, St Laurence's Churchyard, Ramsgate
- Spouse: Prince Augustus Frederick, Duke of Sussex (m. 1793; ann. 1794)
- Children: Sir Augustus d'Este; Augusta Wilde, Lady Truro
- Parent(s): John Murray, 4th Earl of Dunmore; Lady Charlotte Stewart

Lady Augusta De Ameland (born Murray; 27 January 1761 – 4 March 1830) was a Scottish aristocrat and the first wife of Prince Augustus Frederick, Duke of Sussex, the sixth son of George III. They married on 4 April 1793 in Rome. Their union was in contravention of the Royal Marriages Act 1772 because the Prince had not asked his father's permission, so she was not legally recognised as his wife.

== Early life ==
Lady Augusta was born in Scotland possibly at Holyrood Palace. Her father was John Murray, 4th Earl of Dunmore and her mother was Lady Charlotte Stewart, a younger daughter of Alexander Stewart, 6th Earl of Galloway.

== Marriage ==
Lady Augusta secretly married Prince Augustus Frederick, sixth son of King George III, on 4 April 1793 in a Church of England ceremony in her lodgings at Hotel Sarmiento, Rome. They were married again on 5 December 1793 in St George's, Hanover Square, London, using their correct names but without revealing their full identities. Both marriage ceremonies were outside the terms of the Royal Marriages Act 1772 and were annulled in July 1794. Therefore, when the prince was ennobled as Duke of Sussex in 1801, she could not use the title Duchess of Sussex.

The couple had two children:

- Augustus Frederick d'Este (13 January 1794 – 28 December 1848)
- Augusta Emma d'Este, later Lady Truro (9 August 1801 – 21 May 1866), who married Thomas Wilde, 1st Baron Truro of Bowes on 13 August 1845

== Later life ==
Prince Augustus tried to have his marriage to Lady Augusta recognised for many years, but eventually, he separated from her. On 27 November 1801, the King created him, Duke of Sussex, Earl of Inverness, and Baron Arklow. In 1806, Lady Augusta was given royal licence to use the surname De Ameland instead of Murray. Lady Augusta had a home at 1 Connaught Place, built for her in 1807 by her brother-in-law, Prince William Frederick, Duke of Gloucester and Edinburgh.

She was granted a pension of £4,000 per annum and bought a house in Ramsgate where she created a small estate. Augusta died on 4 March 1830 and is buried in the D'Este mausoleum in the churchyard at St Laurence-in-Thanet in Ramsgate.

After Lady Augusta's death, the Duke of Sussex married Lady Cecilia Underwood.
