= St Laurence's Church, Ramsgate =

Coordinates: 51.337561°N 1.4011898°E

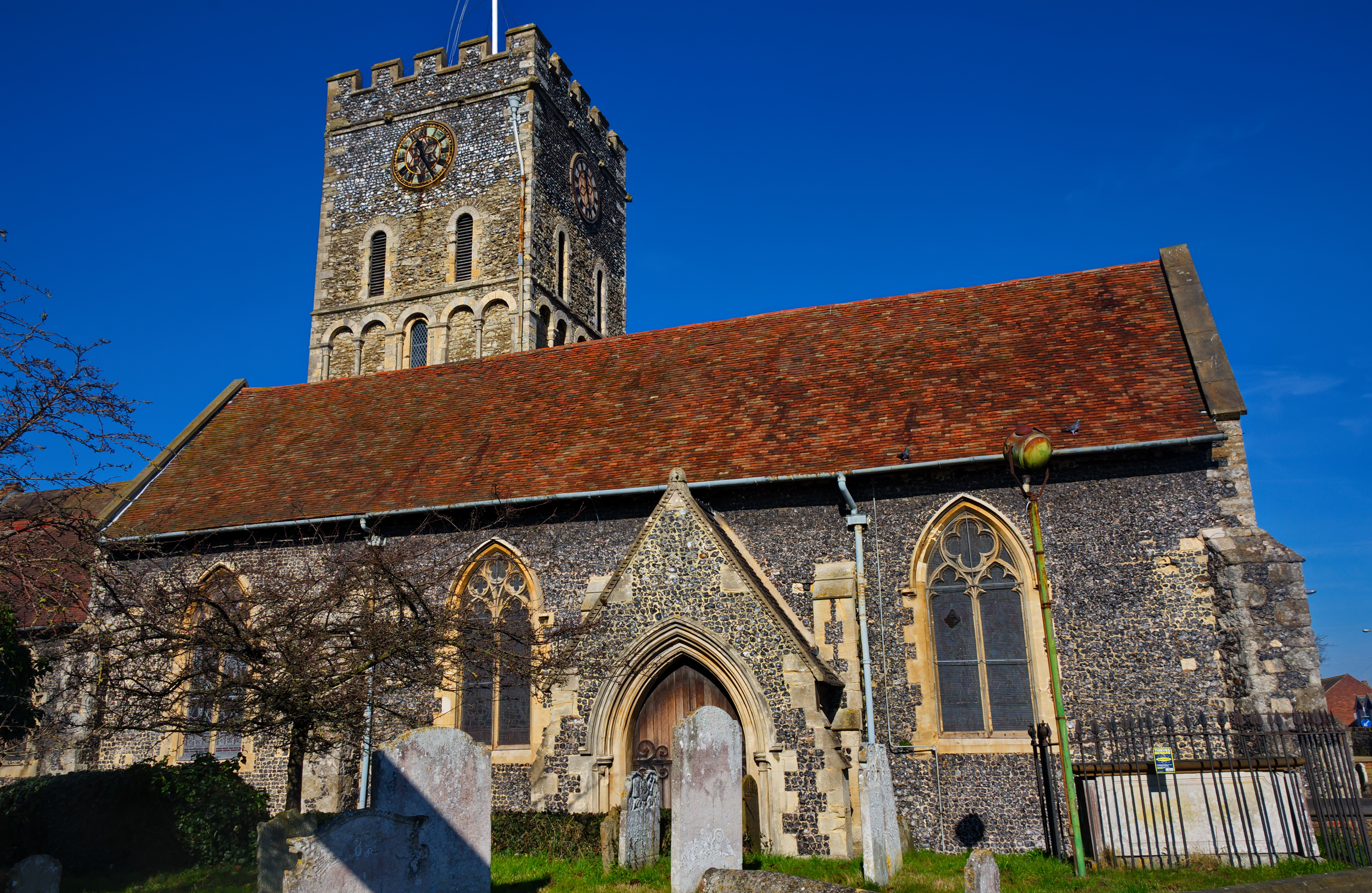
- St Laurence's Church, Ramsgate

- Location within Kent
- OS grid reference: TR 37031 65321
- Location: Ramsgate, Kent
- Country: England
- Denomination: Anglican

History
- Status: Parish church
- Founded: 1062

Architecture
- Functional status: Active
- Heritage designation: Grade I
- Designated: 4 February 1988
- Style: Norman, Early English, and Victorian
- Completed: 11th century, 12th and 13th century chancel and aisles, rebuilt in the 15th century with a tower

Specifications
- Materials: Flint, Caen stone

Administration
- Province: Canterbury
- Diocese: Canterbury
- Archdeaconry: Canterbury
- Deanery: Thanet
- Parish: St. Laurence in the Isle of Thanet

St Laurence's Church, also known as St Laurence-in-Thanet, is a Church of England parish church in Ramsgate, Thanet, Kent.

== History ==
The church, founded in 1062, is a grade I listed building, and is the oldest church in Ramsgate. It was an abbey church until 1275, when it became the parish church for the entire area, and inherited many of the former responsibilities of the church in nearby Minster. The building was enlarged in the 12th and 13th centuries, when the chancel and side aisles were added.

A lightning strike in 1439 resulted in the church being rebuilt, with the tower being raised to its present height.

As Ramsgate grew in size, the town was granted its own church. St Laurence became a separate parish for the villagers of St Lawrence in 1826, just as the parish church of St George was being built to serve the residents of the town.

== Churchyard ==
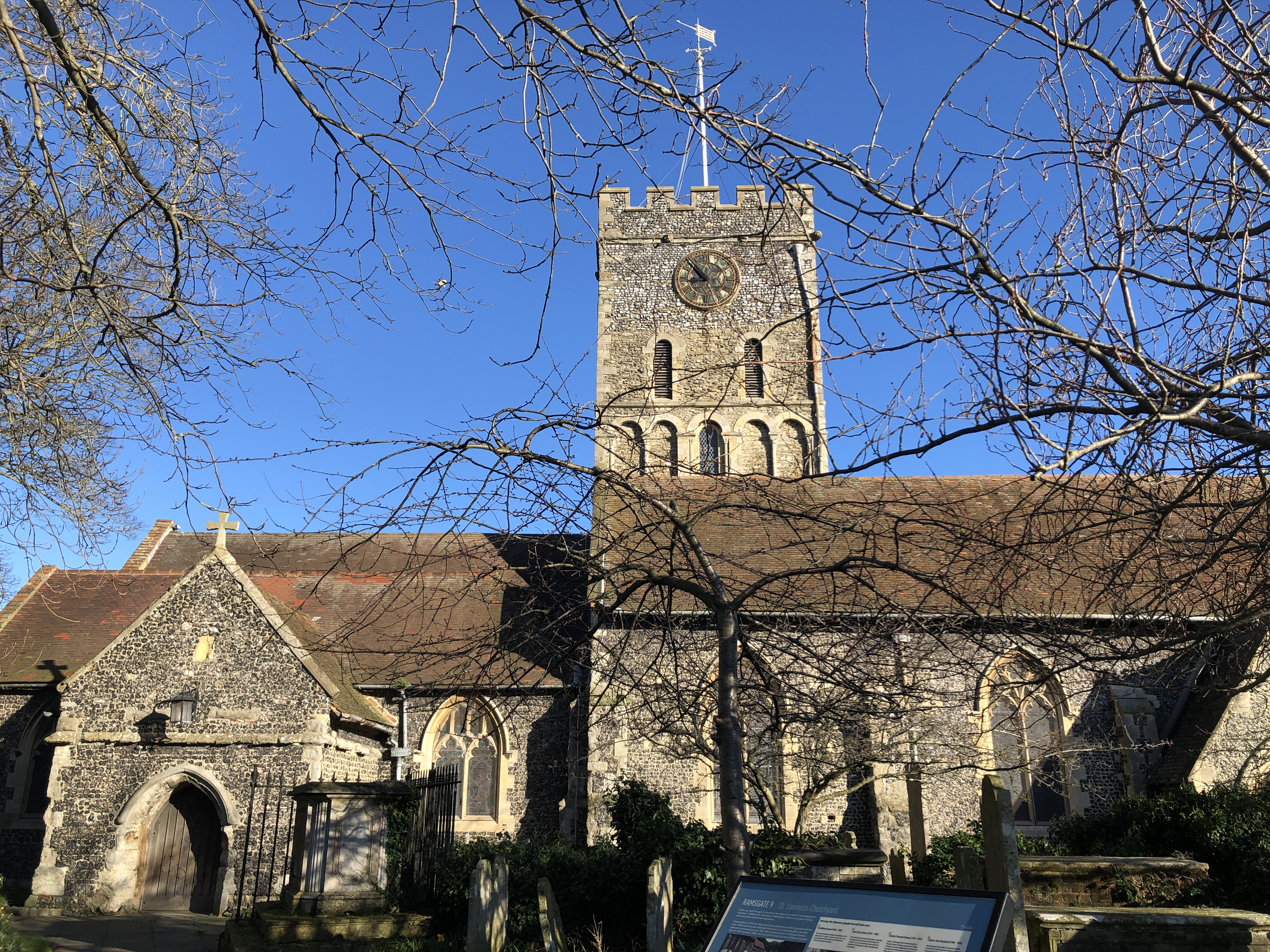
The southern aspect of the church.

St Laurence has a large churchyard covering three and a half acres. It contains over 1400 known graves, the earliest of which is dated to 1656. It also contains the mausoleum of the family of one of Queen Victoria's cousins, Augusta d'Este, later Baroness Truro.

=== Notable burials in the graveyard ===
- Admiral William Fox (c1733-1810)
- Sir William Garrow (1760–1840)
- John Collis Browne (1819–1884)

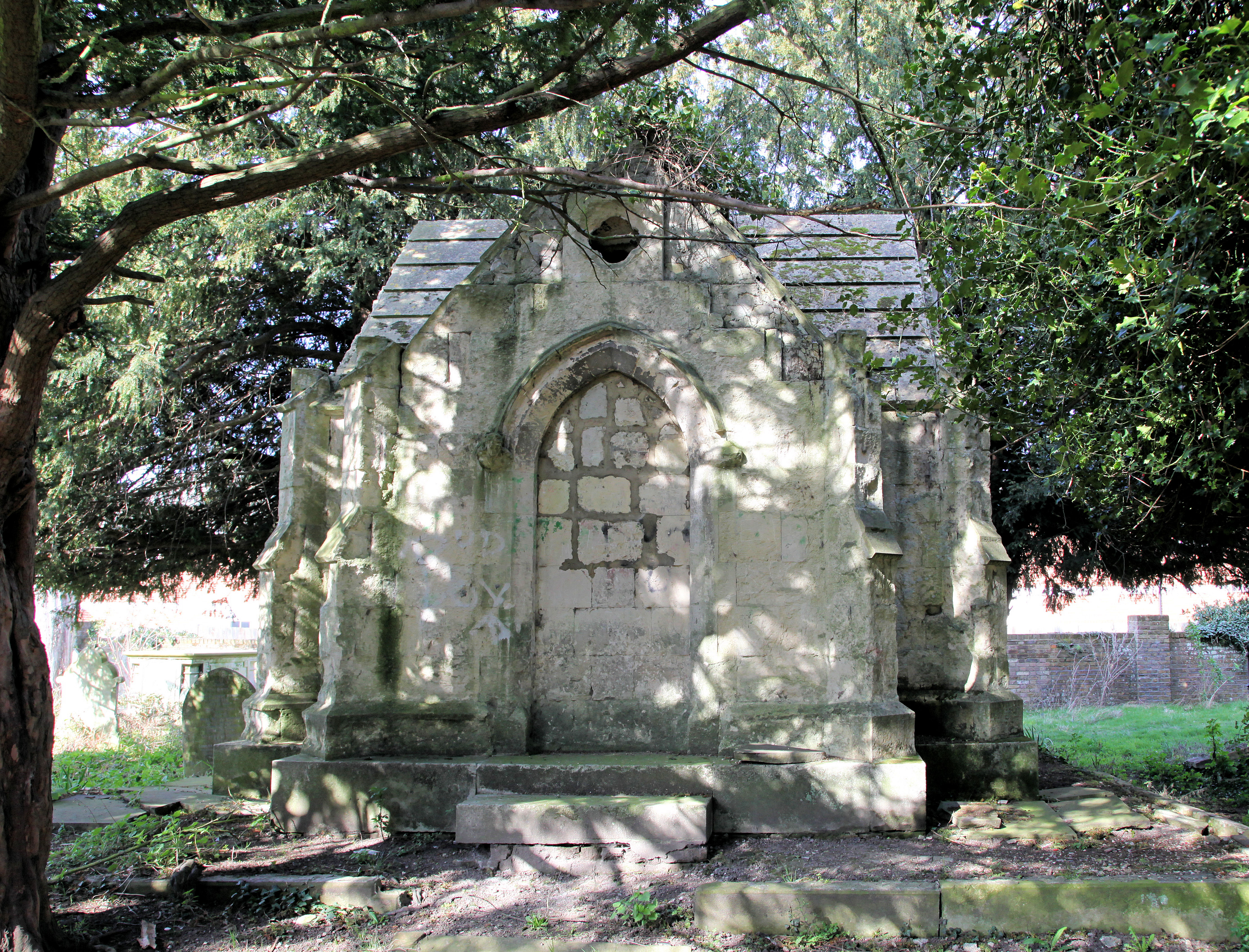
The d'Este Mausoleum in the churchyard

=== The d'Este Mausoleum ===
- John Murray, 4th Earl of Dunmore (1732–1809)
- Lady Charlotte Murray, Countess of Dunmore (1740-1818)
- Lady Augusta Murray (1761-1830)
- Sir Augustus Frederick d'Este (1794-1848)
- Thomas Wilde, 1st Baron Truro (1782–1855)
- Augusta Emma d'Este, Baroness Truro (1801–1866)
