= William Farnworth Handley =

British Member of Parliament

Member of Parliament for Newark
- In office February 1831 – 1835

Personal details
- Born: 9 October 1780
- Died: 4 December 1851 (aged 71)

William Farnworth Handley (9 October 1780 – 4 December 1851) was a British Member of Parliament.

He was the eldest son of William Handley of Newark.

He was appointed High Sheriff of Nottinghamshire for 1822–23 and elected MP for Newark in 1831, sitting until 1835.

He died unmarried in 1851.

Parliament of the United Kingdom
Preceded by Henry Willoughby; Michael Thomas Sadler	Member of Parliament for Newark; Feb 1831 – 1835; With: Michael Thomas Sadler to 1831; Thomas Wilde 1831–1832; William Ewart Gladstone 1832–1835	Succeeded by Thomas Wilde; William Ewart Gladstone
