= Barford Court, Hove =

Barford Court
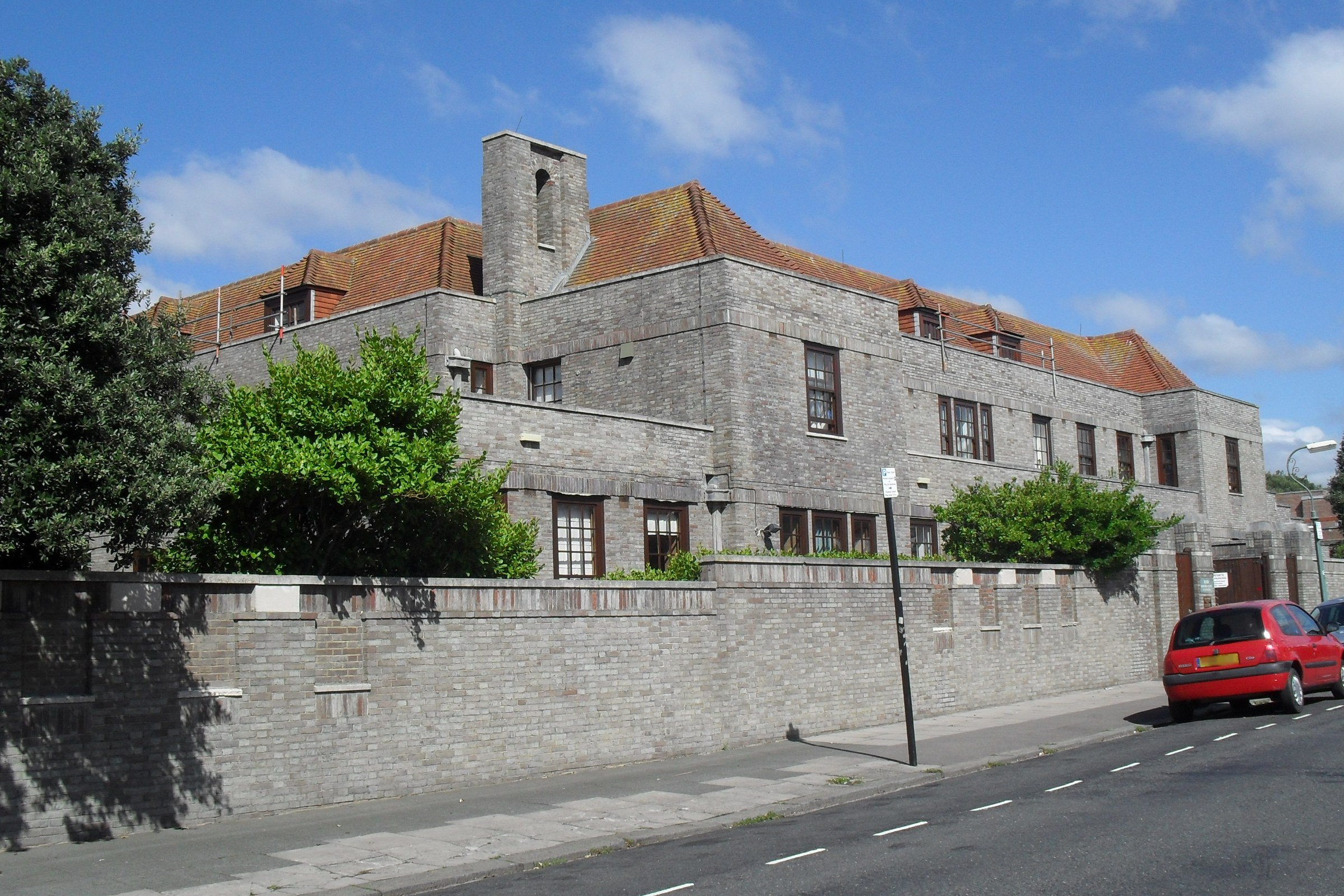
- The building from the southeast

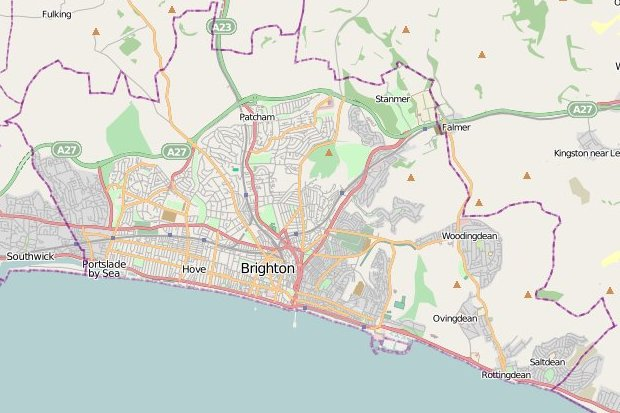
- Location within Brighton and Hove
- 50.8264°N 0.1827°W
- Location: 157 Kingsway, Hove, Brighton and Hove BN3 4GR

History
- Built: 1934–1937
- Built for: Ian Stuart Millar

Site notes
- Architect: Robert Cromie
- Architectural styles: Neo-Georgian (exterior); Art Deco (interior)
- Restored: 1996
- Restored by: Peter Currie Architects

Listed Building – Grade II
- Official name: No. 157 Kingsway (formerly School of Nursing)
- Designated: 14 October 1986
- Reference no.: 1298639

Barford Court is a care home operated by the Royal Masonic Benevolent Institution and situated on the seafront in Hove, part of the English city of Brighton and Hove. The building, completed in 1937, has had this function only since 1996; it was constructed by cinema architect Robert Cromie as a private house for Ian Stuart Millar, an eccentric iron industry tycoon, who occupied it for only nine years. The large building later accommodated the Brighton and Hove School of Nursing, which for the first time brought together training provision for all local hospitals' staff on one site. When the school moved away in 1989, the house spent several years on the market awaiting a buyer—and in steadily deteriorating structural condition—before being refurbished, extended, renamed and converted to its present use.

The building is distinctive and idiosyncratic in its layout, positioning, materials and architectural style. Many interior touches are reminiscent of interwar Art Deco cinema architecture, contrasting with the "austere" Neo-Georgian exterior. Handmade, specially commissioned bricks in an unusual purplish grey colour were used to build the house, which is surrounded by a high wall of the same material. The layout was designed to accommodate the motor-car at a time when they were uncommon, with garaging space integrated into the design of the ground floor. Several design motifs recur throughout, and high-quality internal fittings such as built-in furniture and an unusual staircase have been preserved. English Heritage has listed the building at Grade II for its architectural and historical importance. The surrounding wall is also listed separately at Grade II.

== History ==
Hove originated as an agricultural hamlet on the English Channel coast west of the more important settlement of Brighton. It was surrounded by farmland used for grazing sheep. In response to Brighton's rapid 18th- and 19th-century growth into one of England's largest and most popular seaside resorts, Hove (whose population in 1825 was only 300, compared to more than 25,000 in Brighton) developed into a genteel, characterful residential town with spacious streets of large houses. The streets around Pembroke Crescent and Prince's Crescent, just north of the seafront, were typical examples: developed in the 1890s by prolific local architects Lainson & Sons and Clayton & Black in the Domestic Revival/Queen Anne style.

A site at the south end of Princes Crescent, facing the seafront road (Kingsway) and the sea, remained vacant until the 1930s. Ian Stuart Millar, an eccentric business magnate and occasional film director whose investments in the Tyneside steel and iron industries made him a millionaire in the early 20th century, moved to Hove and lived at Pembroke Crescent from 1923. In 1934, seeking a larger, custom-built house, he commissioned architect Robert Cromie to design one to his specifications. Cromie was in the middle of a prolific spell of cinema designing: he was responsible for nearly 40 in England during the 1920s and 1930s, including one at Denmark Villas in Hove.

Hove Council, the local governing body at the time, approved Cromie's plans on 8 March 1934, and building work started that year. The bricks used to build the walls were specially commissioned and handmade to order in Italy; their colour has been described as silver-grey or purple-grey, giving a "drab" effect. Too many were ordered: the excess bricks were apparently buried near Hove railway station rather than reused, although the site has never been confirmed. The house was completed in 1937.

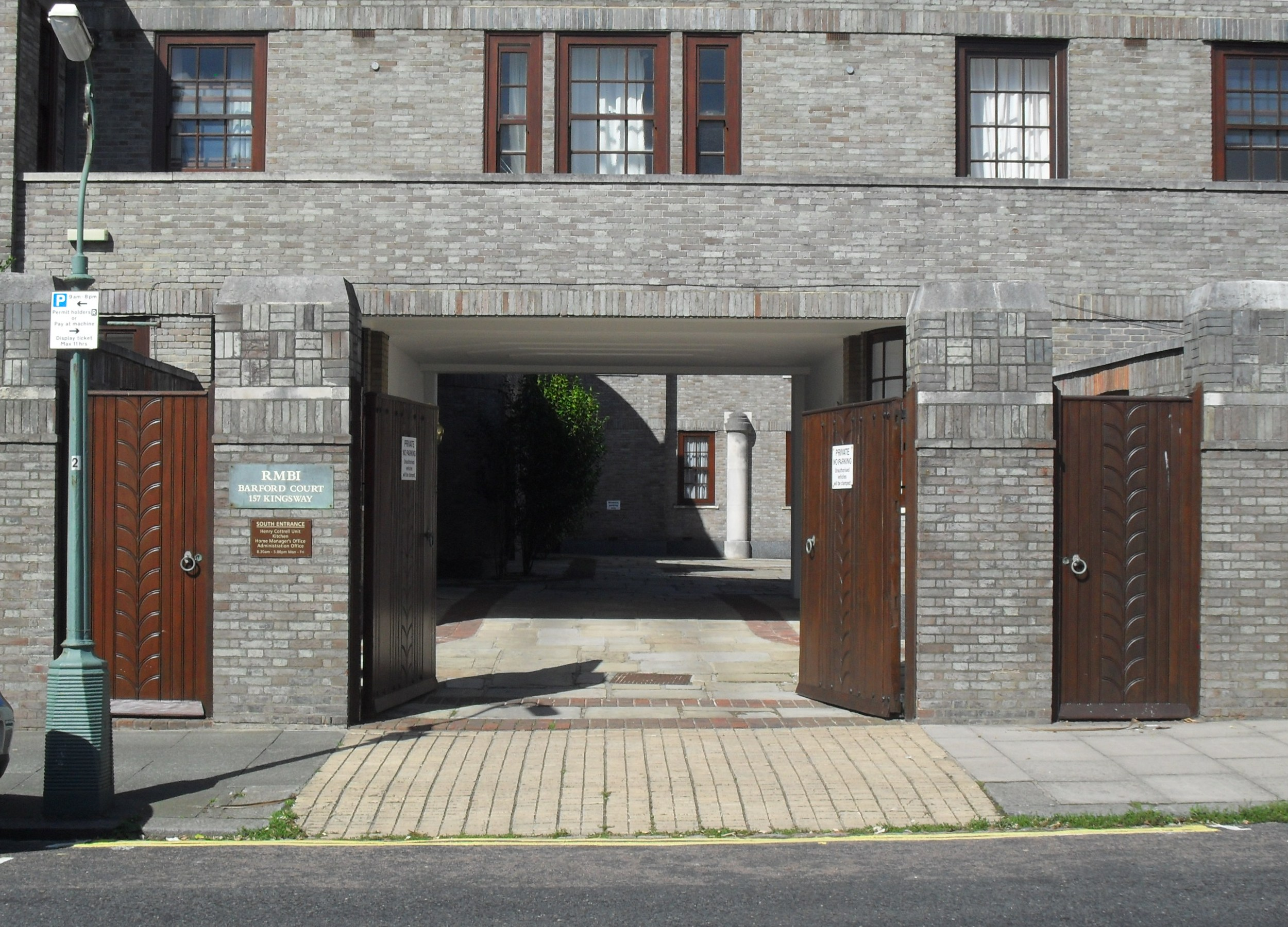
A covered driveway on the east side led to the courtyard. Repeated wheat-ear motifs characterise the exterior.

Cromie designed the house for the convenience of visitors arriving by car. The entrance faced north on to a courtyard; visitors would drive straight into it through a wide covered driveway from Princes Crescent (on the east side), and could park in multiple-occupancy garages separated by small brick columns. The roof of this approach was decorated with geometric patterns. Moreover, lights would come on automatically at night when a car arrived, and a fountain in the grounds would be activated. Such attention to motorists' needs was uncommon so early in the history of motoring. Millar himself had his own chauffeur, who lived in a flat in the grounds.

In 1946, Millar sold the house to Hove Hospital for £40,000 (£1,448,000 in 2025). This institution was established in 1859 and moved to a larger site on Sackville Road in 1885. Its nurses had previously lived onsite, but Millar's former home was converted into living quarters (under the name Hove General Hospital Annexe) and the newly vacant rooms at Sackville Road were converted into extra wards, nearly doubling the hospital's capacity. Another change of use came in 1963, when the area's three main hospitals—Brighton General, the Royal Sussex County and the Royal Alexandra—established a joint training school in the building. Until then, nurses had been trained in separate facilities at each hospital. The conversion cost £27,000 (£430,000 in 2025).

The Brighton and Hove School of Nursing, as it was known, stayed at the Kingsway site until 1989, when a larger facility was opened at the University of Sussex campus. Brighton Health Authority, the owners at the time, tried to sell the building, but it stood empty and in a deteriorating state for more than four years. Proposals included moving Hove Museum into the building from its site at Brooker Hall, but only when the Royal Masonic Benevolent Institution submitted a planning application (jointly with the Department of Health) for a care home was there any progress. Their plans were approved in December 1993, restoration work started almost immediately, and a well-supported public open day in 1994 preceded the building's reopening as a 40-bed care home in 1996. The Duke of Kent conducted the opening ceremony on behalf of the Royal Masonic Benevolent Institution on 3 December 1996.

Under its street address of 157 Kingsway, Barford Court was listed at Grade II by English Heritage on 14 October 1986. The perimeter wall and its wooden gates were listed separately on the same date, also at Grade II. In February 2001, they were two of the 1,124 Grade II-listed buildings and structures, and 1,218 listed buildings of all grades, in the city of Brighton and Hove.

== Architecture ==
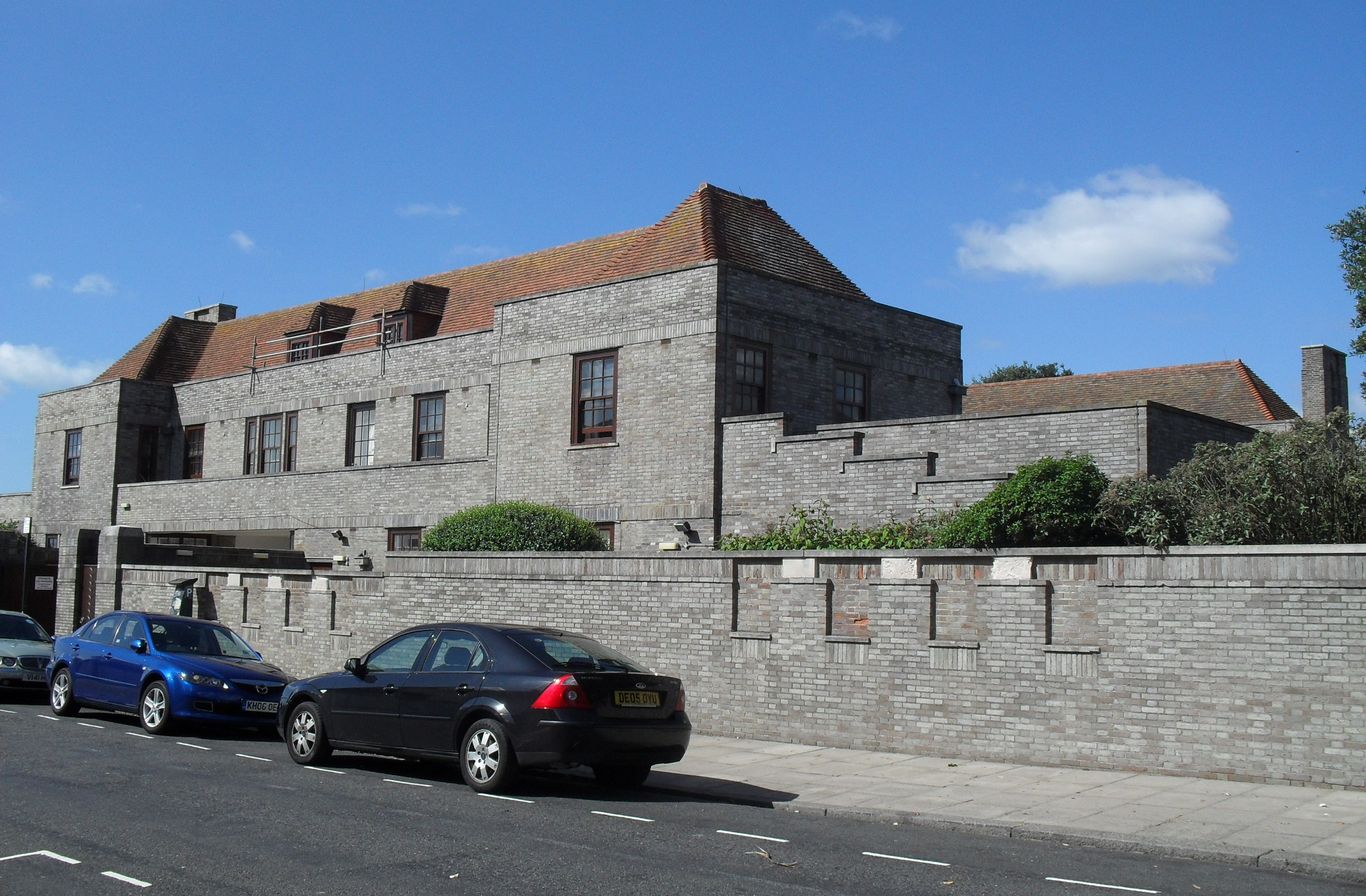
Barford Court and its surrounding walls are built of greyish-purple brick.

Robert Cromie was Britain's foremost cinema and theatre architect, and his design for Ian Stuart Millar's house (variously described as "interesting", "sophisticated" and "curious") was influenced by his work on such buildings. In particular, the interior—whose elaborate flourishes and modern features contrast with the "austere" Neo-Georgian exterior—has much in common with the Art Deco style in which he usually worked.

The outside walls are built of thin handmade bricks imported from Italy, supported on a base of granite. They are laid in the Flemish bond pattern and are greyish-purple in colour. The hipped roof is laid with handmade tiles. The building was originally U-shaped with an open north side, although design firm Peter Currie Architects' renovation work in 1994–96 added a single-storey range to form an enclosed courtyard. Other additions have hidden some of the original features, especially in the east (entrance) wing. Decorative elements and motifs on the exterior include geometric patterning on the driveway roof, two-tone brick courses in the courtyard walls, wooden doors with vertical ear-of-wheat carvings, gable ends and arched chimney-stacks. The two-storey house is set slightly below road level, which together with the high perimeter wall means that sea views are only possible from the top floor.

The south (garden) front has four bays with ranges of four, three, four and two windows respectively. These are the original sash windows with wooden frames, installed in the 1930s. There are also three dormer windows above. The second and fourth bays project slightly, forming first-floor balconies. On the north side, the front door (with a wheat-ear design, and again with a balcony above) faces the courtyard and some brick-bordered flowerbeds with automatic electric lights. Short columns (five on the west side and more, now hidden, on the east wing) separate the parking garages.

Cromie gave the interior up-to-date features such as inlaid lighting and underfloor heating, and themes such as two-tone colour schemes and wooden fixtures are found throughout. The ground floor has extensive areas of tiling in contrasting colours; most light fittings are partly of wood, and some have multiple branches; the doors are panelled with two-tone wood; some walls have hardwood panels; and pargeting, fluting and decorative mouldings are also visible. The staircase has an ornate chandelier, but its main point of interest is the unusual design of the balusters: a series of right-angled stepped blocks linked by four concentric quarter-circles of bronze. There are other bronze fixtures as well, and some marblework on the ground floor. A variety of built-in furniture also survives, despite the reordering of the interior to cater for the building's present use.

== See also ==
- Grade II listed buildings in Brighton and Hove: A–B

== Bibliography ==
- Antram, Nicholas; Morrice, Richard (2008). Brighton and Hove. Pevsner Architectural Guides. London: Yale University Press. ISBN 978-0-300-12661-7.
- Middleton, Judy (2002). The Encyclopaedia of Hove & Portslade. Brighton: Brighton & Hove Libraries.
