= Prince Augustus Frederick, Duke of Sussex =

British prince (1773–1843)

Prince Augustus Frederick
- Duke of Sussex
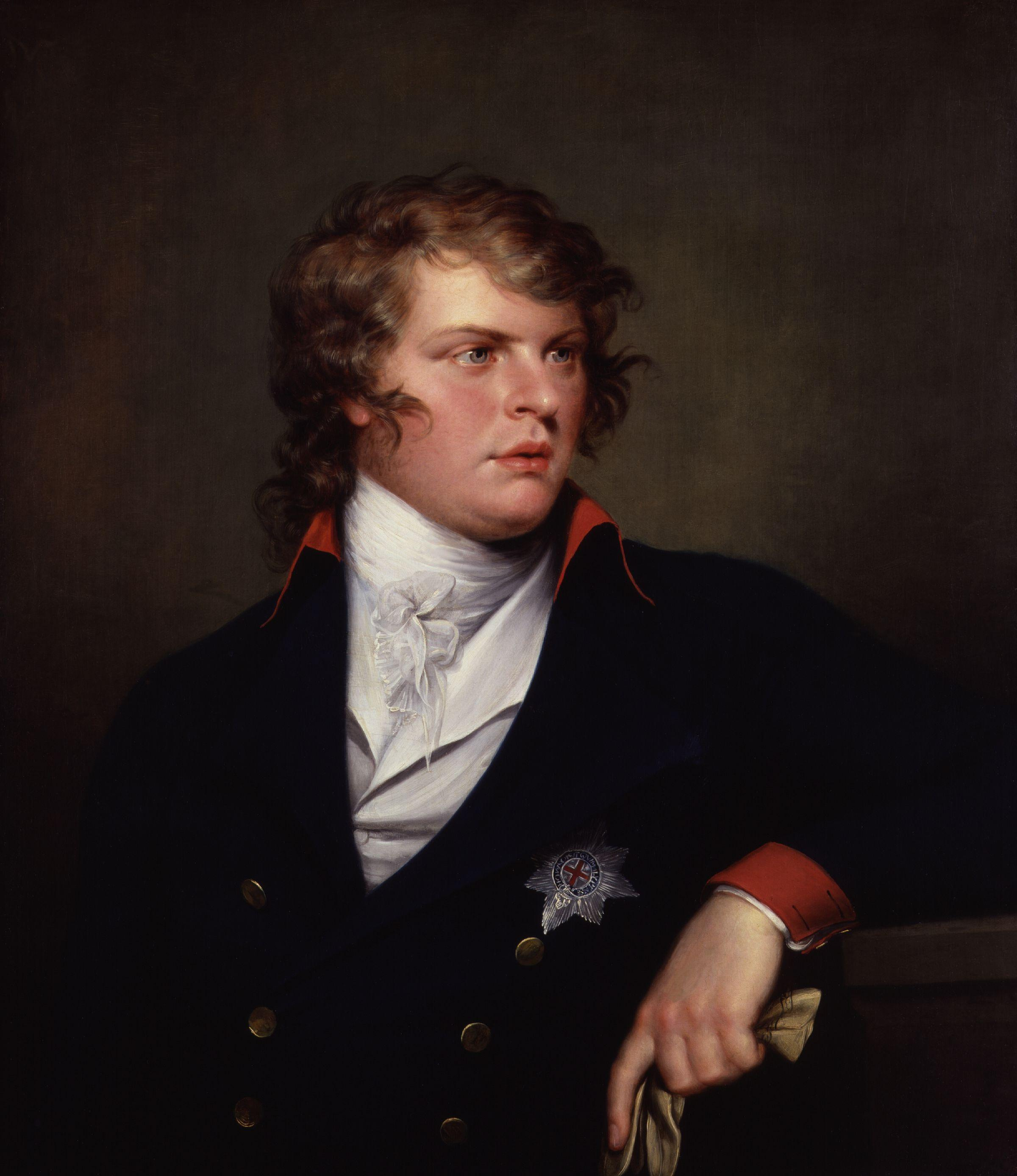
- Portrait by Guy Head, 1798
- Born: 27 January 1773; Buckingham House, London, England
- Died: 21 April 1843 (aged 70); Kensington Palace, London, England
- Burial: 4 May 1843; Kensal Green Cemetery, London
- Spouses: Lady Augusta Murray (m. 1793; ann. 1794) Lady Cecilia Underwood (m. 1831)
- Issue: Sir Augustus d'Este; Augusta Wilde, Lady Truro
- House: Hanover
- Father: George III
- Mother: Charlotte of Mecklenburg-Strelitz

25th President of the Royal Society
- In office 1830–1838
- Preceded by: Davies Gilbert
- Succeeded by: Spencer Compton

Prince Augustus Frederick, Duke of Sussex (27 January 1773 – 21 April 1843), was the sixth son and ninth child of King George III and his queen consort, Charlotte of Mecklenburg-Strelitz. He was the only surviving son of George III who did not pursue a career in the British military. A Whig, he was known for his liberal views, which included reform of Parliament, abolition of the slave trade, Catholic emancipation, and the removal of existing civil restrictions on Jews and Dissenters.

== Biography ==
=== Early life ===
Augustus Frederick was born on 27 January 1773 at Buckingham House, London. He was the ninth child and sixth son of King George III and Queen Charlotte.

Nine-year-old Prince Augustus in 1782, painted by Thomas Gainsborough

Augustus Frederick was baptised in the Great Council Chamber at St James's Palace, on 25 February 1773, by Archbishop of Canterbury Frederick Cornwallis. His godparents were the Duke of Saxe-Gotha-Altenburg (his paternal first cousin once-removed, for whom the Earl of Hertford, Lord Chamberlain, stood proxy), Duke George Augustus of Mecklenburg (his maternal uncle, for whom the Earl of Bristol, Groom of the Stool, stood proxy) and Princess Charles of Hesse-Cassel (his first cousin once-removed, for whom the Viscountess Weymouth, Lady of the Bedchamber to the queen, stood proxy).

Augustus Frederick was tutored at home before being sent to the University of Göttingen in Germany in the summer of 1786, along with his brothers Prince Ernest and Prince Adolphus. Prince Augustus, who suffered from asthma, did not join his brothers in receiving military training in Hanover. He briefly considered becoming a cleric in the Church of England. In 1805, during the Napoleonic War, he served at home in Britain as Lieutenant-Colonel Commandant of the "Loyal North Britons" Volunteers regiment.

=== First marriage ===
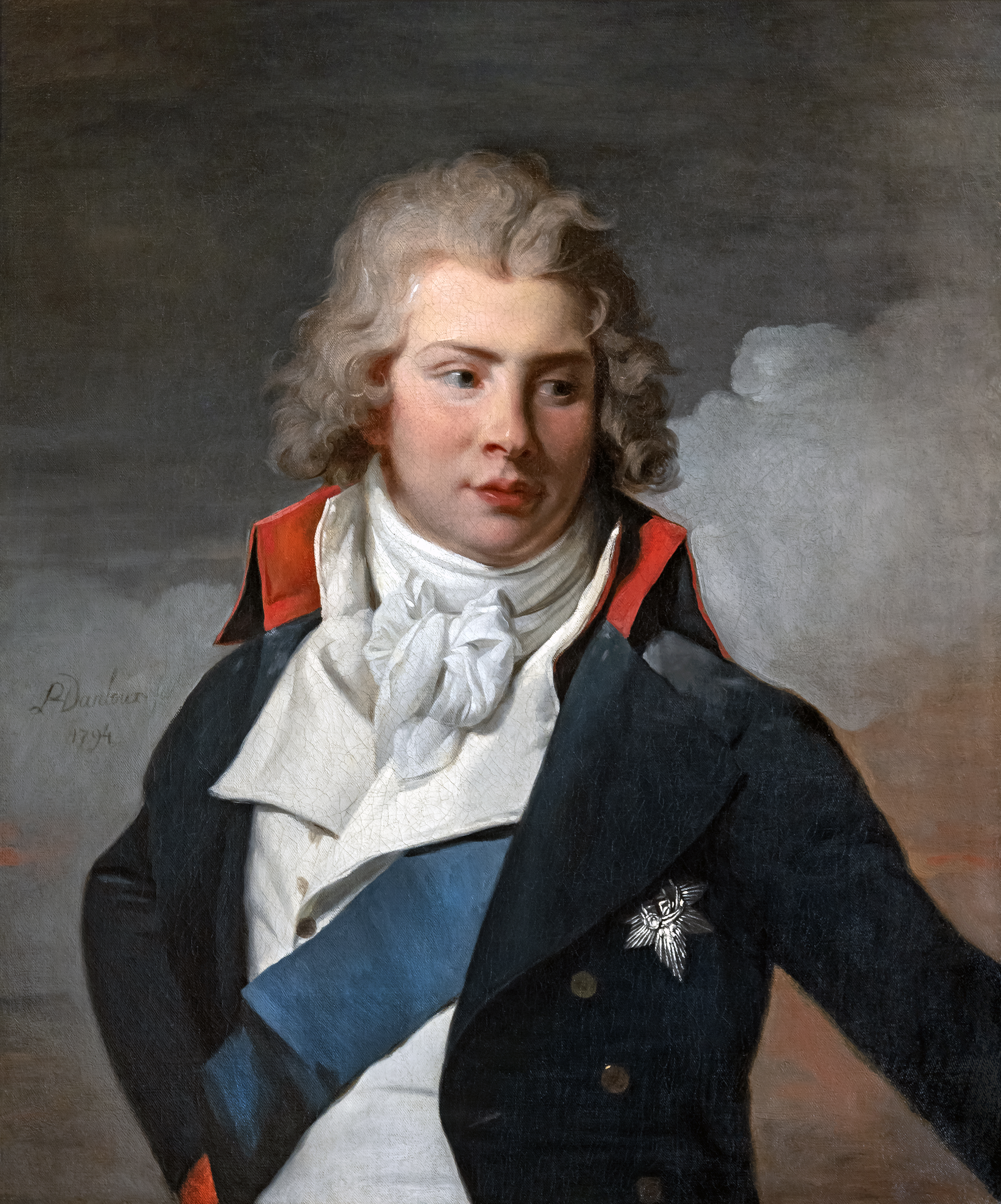
Prince Augustus, Duke of Sussex, by Henri-Pierre Danloux, c. 1794

While travelling in Italy, the prince met Lady Augusta Murray (1768–1830), the second daughter of the 4th Earl of Dunmore. The couple secretly married in Rome on 4 April 1793. The King's minister of Hanover affairs Ernst zu Münster was sent to Italy to escort him back to London.

The couple married again without revealing their full identities at St George's, Hanover Square, Westminster, on 5 December 1793. Both marriages took place without the consent, or even the knowledge, of his father.

In August 1794, the Court of Arches pronounced the prince's first marriage null and void on the grounds that it contravened the Royal Marriages Act 1772, not having been approved by the King. However, Prince Augustus Frederick continued to live with Lady Augusta until 1801, when he received a parliamentary grant of £12,000 and the couple separated, the Duke moving to Grosvenor Square. Lady Augusta retained custody of their children and received maintenance of £4,000 a year. Their two children were named Augustus Frederick d'Este and Augusta Emma d'Este, both parents being descended from the royal House of Este. In 1806, their mother, Lady Augusta, was given royal licence to use the surname "de Ameland" instead of Murray.

=== Duke of Sussex and Knight of the Garter ===
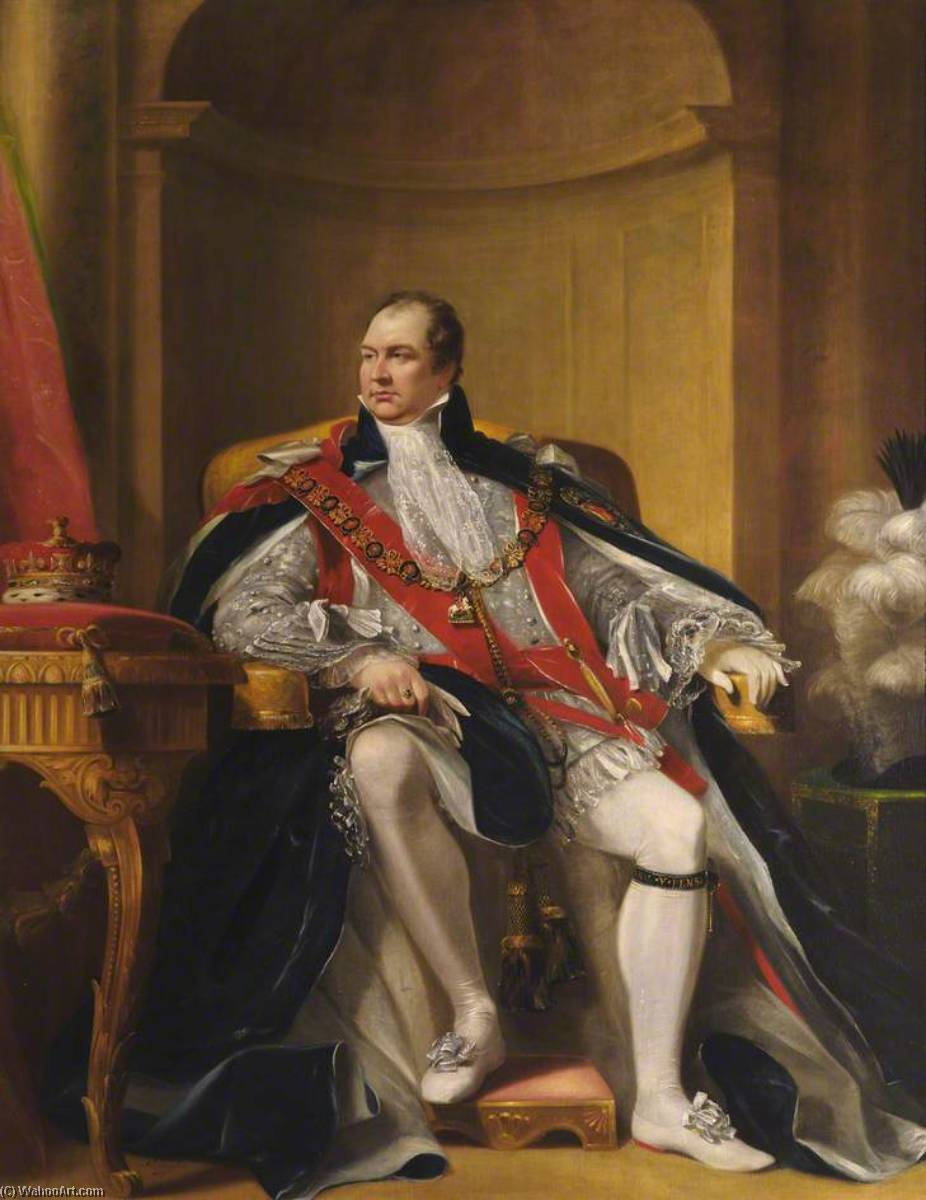
The Duke of Sussex in robes of the Garter, by James Lonsdale, c. 1820

Augustus Frederick was invested as a Knight of the Garter on 2 June 1786, and installed by dispensation on 28 May 1801. The King created him Duke of Sussex, Earl of Inverness, and Baron Arklow in the Peerage of the United Kingdom on 24 November 1801. Since he had no legitimate issue, the title became extinct on his death in 1843. In 1815 the Duke became a patron of the Jews' Hospital and Orphan Asylum, later to become the charity known today as Norwood. Royal patronage continued, with King Charles III eventually becoming Norwood's patron.

=== Mistresses ===
A known mistress was Mrs. Bugge. Sir William Dillon recorded in his diary they were both present with him at a party held by Emma Hamilton (Lord Nelson's mistress) where she rented tableware for the meal but neglected to rent a carving knife, creating great difficulty in serving the Christmas dinner to her guests.

=== United Grand Lodge of England ===
In January 1813, Augustus Frederick became Grand Master of the Premier Grand Lodge of England, and in December of that year his brother, Prince Edward, Duke of Kent and Strathearn, became Grand Master of the Antient Grand Lodge of England. On 27 December 1813 the United Grand Lodge of England was constituted at Freemasons' Hall, London with Prince Augustus Frederick as Grand Master. In 1842, he founded the Royal Masonic Benevolent Institution.

George Oliver's Signs and Symbols Illustrated and Explained in a Course of Twelve Lectures on Freemasonry (1837) was dedicated to Prince Augustus Frederick, Duke of Sussex.

=== Second marriage ===
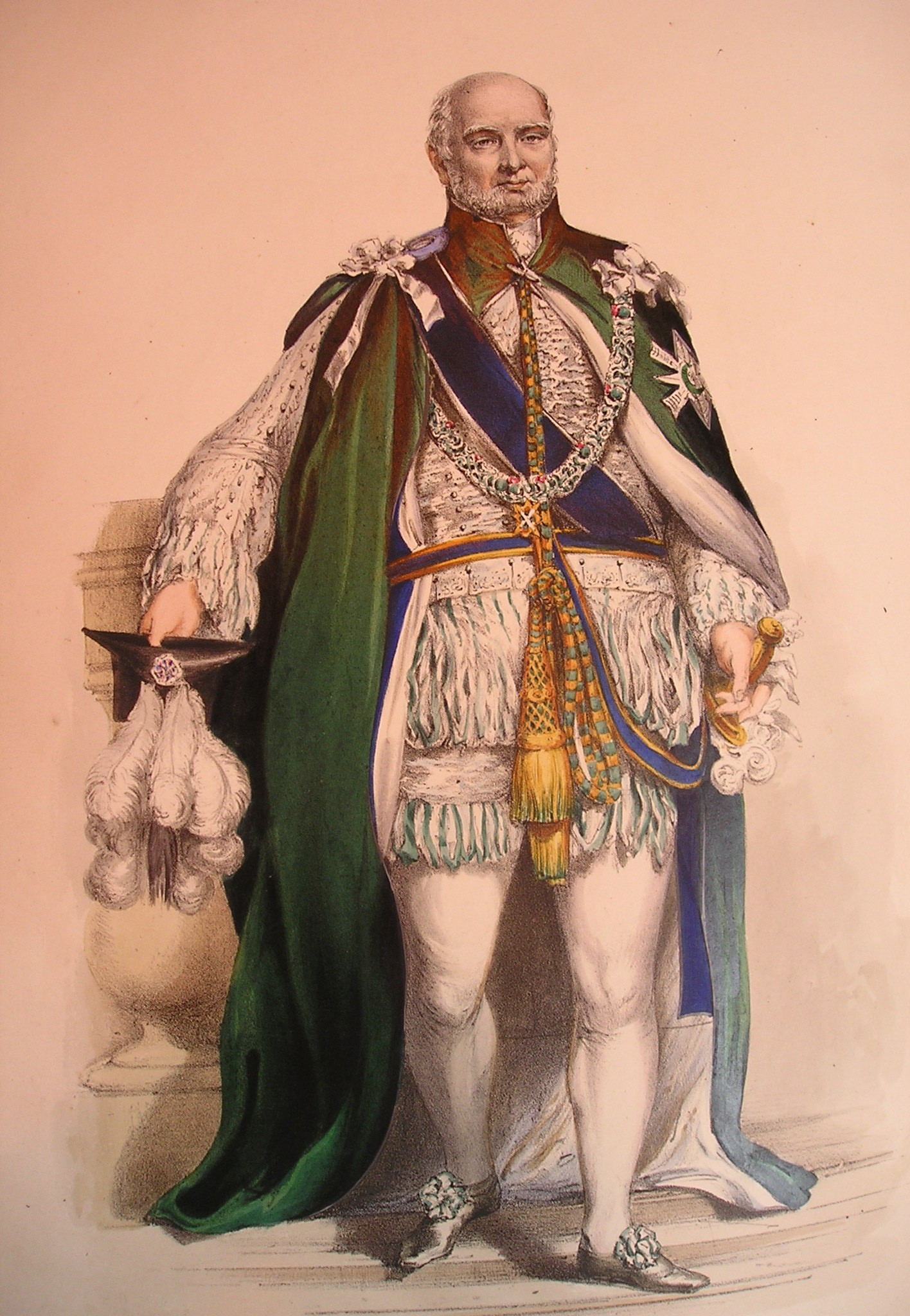
Wearing the robes of a knight of the Order of the Thistle

A year after the death of Lady Augusta D'Ameland (Lady Augusta Murray), the Duke of Sussex married a second time on 2 May 1831 (again in contravention of the Royal Marriages Act) to Lady Cecilia Letitia Buggin (1793–1873), the eldest daughter of Arthur Gore, 2nd Earl of Arran, and Elizabeth Underwood, and the widow of Sir George Buggin. On the same day, Lady Cecilia assumed the surname Underwood by royal licence. She was never titled or recognized as the Duchess of Sussex. However, she was created Duchess of Inverness in her own right by Queen Victoria in 1840.

=== Later life ===
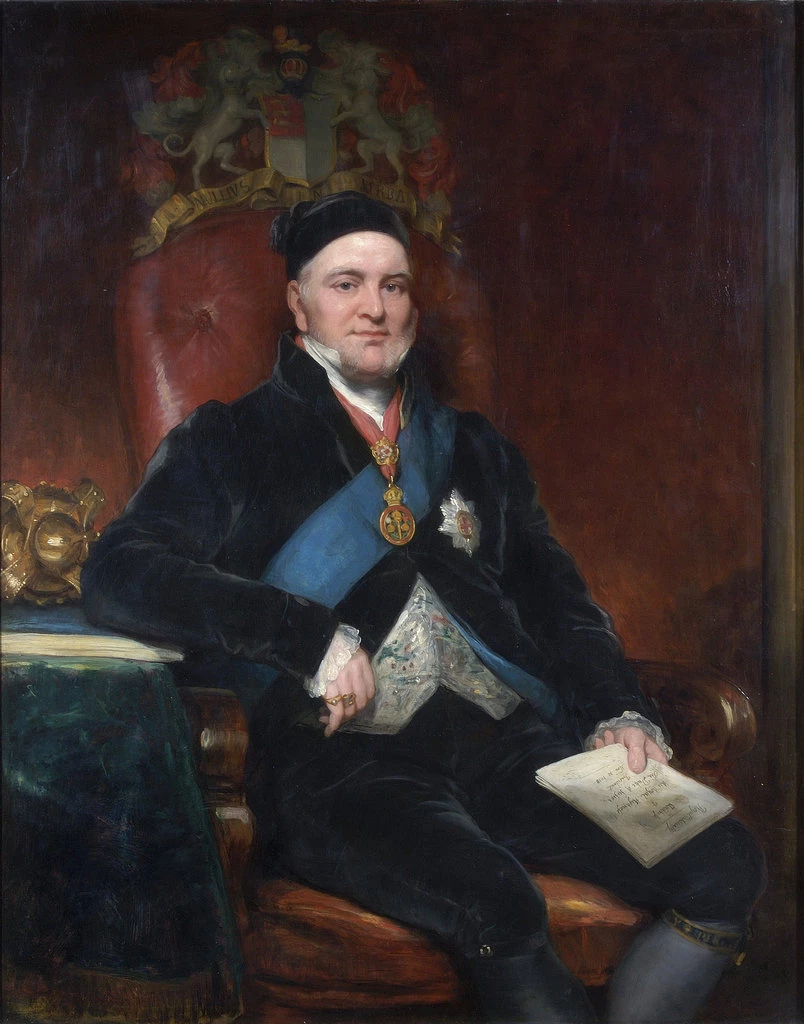
Portrait of the Duke of Sussex in his old age, by Thomas Phillips, c. 1838

Augustus Frederick was appointed by his elder brother King William IV Chief Ranger and Keeper of St James's Park and Hyde Park on 29 January 1831, and his niece Queen Victoria appointed him Governor of Windsor Castle in 1842. The Duke of Sussex was elected president of the Society of Arts in 1816 and held that post for the rest of his life. He also held the honorary posts of Colonel of the Honourable Artillery Company from 1817, and of Captain-General (at which point the posts were united) from 1837 onward. He was president of the Royal Society between 1830 and 1838, and had a keen interest in biblical studies and Hebrew. His personal library contained over 50,000 theological manuscripts, some in Hebrew. In 1838, he introduced in a meeting scientist John Herschel, and the Duke gave a speech in which he spoke about the compatibility of science and religion:

In making these remarks I am not presumptuous; but allow me to say, that attached as I am to science – attached as I am to religion, I am satisfied that the real philosopher is the most religious man; and it is in looking to the operations in nature that the finger of the Almighty leads us to the lesson. (16 June 1838)

The Duke of Sussex was the favourite uncle of Queen Victoria. He gave her away at her wedding to Prince Albert of Saxe-Coburg and Gotha in 1840.

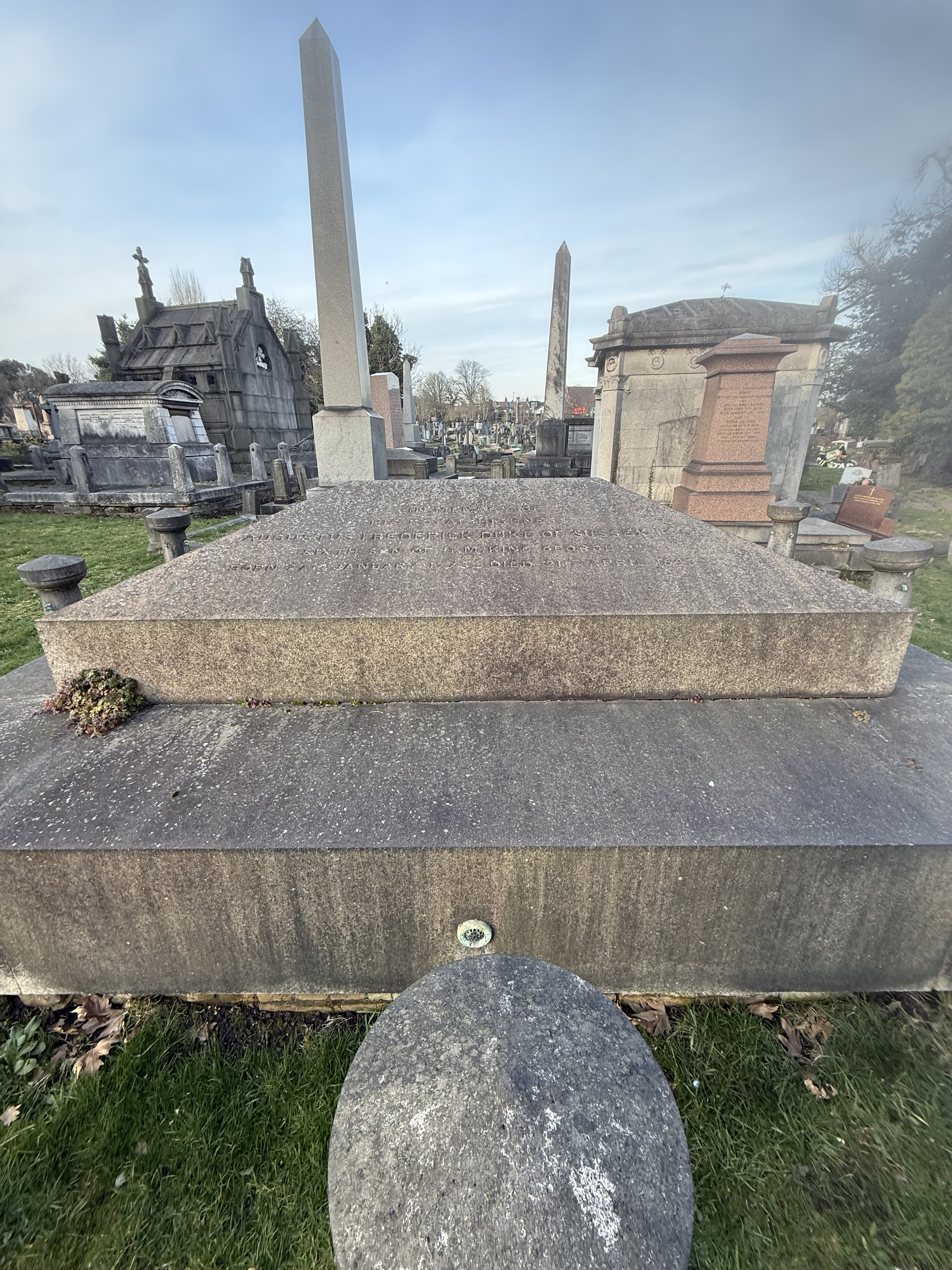
Tomb of Augustus Frederick, Kensal Green Cemetery, London (February 2025)

The Duke of Sussex died, aged 70 of erysipelas, at Kensington Palace in 1843. In his will he specified that he was not to have a state funeral and was accordingly buried at Kensal Green Cemetery on 4 May 1843. He is buried in front of the main chapel, immediately opposite the tomb of his sister Princess Sophia. The Duchess of Inverness continued to reside at Kensington Palace until her death in 1873. She was buried next to Prince Augustus. As he had married without the required royal permission his children were illegitimate under English law and could not inherit their father's title. Both children died childless, making the possible issue of their inheritance moot.

== Titles, styles, honours and arms ==
Coat of arms used from 1801 until his death

=== Titles and styles ===
- 27 January 1773 – 27 November 1801: His Royal Highness Prince Augustus Frederick
- 24 November 1801 – 21 April 1843: His Royal Highness The Duke of Sussex

The duke held the subsidiary titles of Earl of Inverness and Baron Arklow.

=== Honours ===
- Grand Prior of England of the Order of the Temple
- Grand Master of the Premier Grand Lodge of England, 1813
- Grand Master of the United Grand Lodge of England, 1813–1843
- Knight of the Order of the Garter, 27 June 1786
- Knight Grand Cross of the Royal Guelphic Order, 12 July 1815
- Knight of the Order of the Thistle, 19 July 1830
- Knight Grand Cross of the Order of the Bath, 15 December 1837
- Grand Master of the Order of the Bath, 16 December 1837
- Captain-General and Colonel Honourable Artillery Company

=== Arms ===
As a son of the sovereign, the Duke of Sussex had use of the arms of the kingdom, differenced by a label argent of three points, the centre point bearing two hearts gules, the outer points each bearing a cross gules.

== Issue ==
Name	Birth	Death	Notes
By Lady Augusta Murray (married 4 April 1793; annulled)
Augustus Frederick d'Este	13 January 1794	28 December 1848
Augusta Emma d'Este	11 August 1801	21 May 1866	married Thomas Wilde, 1st Baron Truro; no issue.
By Lady Cecilia Underwood (married 2 May 1831)
no issue

== Ancestors ==
Ancestors of Prince Augustus Frederick, Duke of Sussex

8. George II of Great Britain
4. Frederick, Prince of Wales
9. Princess Caroline of Brandenburg-Ansbach
2. George III of the United Kingdom
10. Frederick II, Duke of Saxe-Gotha-Altenburg
5. Princess Augusta of Saxe-Gotha
11. Princess Magdalena Augusta of Anhalt-Zerbst
1. Prince Augustus Frederick, Duke of Sussex
12. Adolphus Frederick II, Duke of Mecklenburg-Strelitz
6. Duke Charles Louis Frederick of Mecklenburg-Strelitz
13. Princess Christiane Emilie of Schwarzburg-Sondershausen
3. Princess Charlotte of Mecklenburg-Strelitz
14. Ernest Frederick I, Duke of Saxe-Hildburghausen
7. Princess Elisabeth Albertine of Saxe-Hildburghausen
15. Countess Sophia Albertine of Erbach-Erbach

== See also ==
- List of presidents of the Royal Society

== Notes ==
Prince Augustus Frederick, Duke of Sussex House of Hanover Cadet branch of the House of Welf Born: 27 January 1773 Died: 21 April 1843
Masonic offices
Preceded by The Earl of Moira as Acting Grand Master of the Premier; Grand Lodge of England	Grand Master of the United; Grand Lodge of England; 1813–1843	Succeeded by The Earl of Zetland
Preceded by The Duke of Kent and Strathearn as Grand Master of the Antient; Grand Lodge of England	Grand Master of the United; Grand Lodge of England; 1813–1843	Succeeded by The Earl of Zetland
Honorary titles
Vacant Title last held by The Duke of Clarence and St Andrews	Great Master of the Order of the Bath; 1837–1843	Succeeded by The Prince Consort
Professional and academic associations
Preceded by Davies Gilbert	25th President of the Royal Society; 1830–1838	Succeeded by Spencer Compton
