= Royal Masonic Benevolent Institution =

Charity in the United Kingdom

The Royal Masonic Benevolent Institution Care Company (RMBI Care Co.)
- Region served: England and Wales
- Website: www.rmbi.org.uk

The Royal Masonic Benevolent Institution Care Company (RMBI Care Co.) cares for older Freemasons and their families as well as people in the wider community. Founded in 1842 by Prince Augustus Frederick, Duke of Sussex, they now provide a home for over 1,000 people across England and Wales, while also providing non-residential support services.

The organisation's Head Office is based in Freemasons’ Hall in Great Queen Street along with the Masonic Charitable Foundation.

== List of services ==
- Residential care
- Nursing care
- Residential dementia support
- Limited sheltered accommodation for people who prefer to live independently
- Respite breaks for people who are cared for in their own homes so that families can have a rest from taking care of a loved one

== History of RMBI Care Co. ==
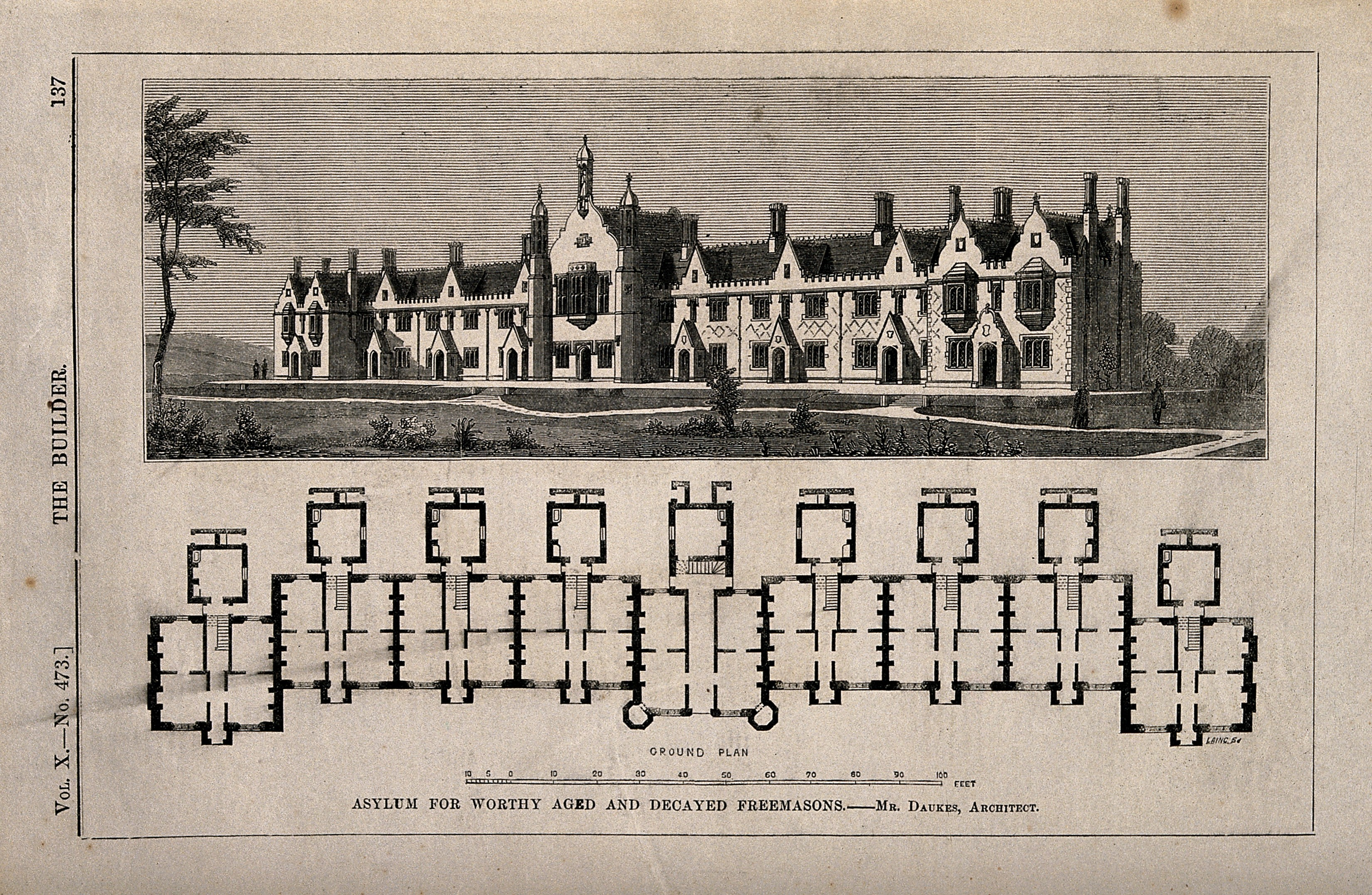
Asylum for Worthy and Decayed Freemasons, Croydon, England: perspective view and floor plan. Wood engraving by C.D. Laing, 1852.

The Royal Masonic Benevolent Institution Care Company started when United Grand Lodge of England inaugurated the Royal Masonic Benevolent Annuity Fund for men in 1842 and the Female Annuity Fund in 1849. The following year, 1850, the first Home was opened in East Croydon named the "Asylum for Worthy, Aged and Decayed Freemasons", and The Royal Masonic Benevolent Institution (RMBI) was established. The Home remained in Croydon for over 100 years until 1955, when, due to the need for bigger premises, the Home was transferred to Harewood Court in Hove, East Sussex.

In the early 1960s, provision was extended to non-annuitants and, between 1960 and 1985, a further 14 Homes were set up or acquired around England and Wales. Four more Homes have been opened since then bringing the number of Homes run by RMBI Care Co. to 18.

== Homes and opening dates ==
1966 Devonshire Court, Oadby, Leicestershire
1967 Scarbrough Court, Cramlington, Northumberland
1968 Prince George Duke of Kent Court, Chislehurst, Kent
1971 Connaught Court, Fulford, York
1973 Lord Harris Court, Sindlesham, Berkshire
1973 Albert Edward Prince of Wales Court, Porthcawl, Mid Glamorgan
1977 Ecclesholme, Eccles, Salford
1977 The Tithebarn, Great Crosby, Liverpool
1979 Queen Elizabeth Court, Llandudno, Conwy
1980 James Terry Court, Croydon, Surrey
1981 Cornwallis Court, Bury St. Edmunds, Suffolk
1983 Zetland Court, Bournemouth, Dorset
1985 Cadogan Court, Exeter, South Devon
1994 Prince Michael of Kent Court, Watford, Hertfordshire
1995 Shannon Court, Hindhead, Surrey
1996 Barford Court, Hove, East Sussex
1998 Prince Edward Duke of Kent Court, Braintree, Essex
2008 Scarbrough Court, Cramlington, Northumberland (re-built on the original site)
