= Baron Truro =

Extinct barony in the Peerage of the United Kingdom

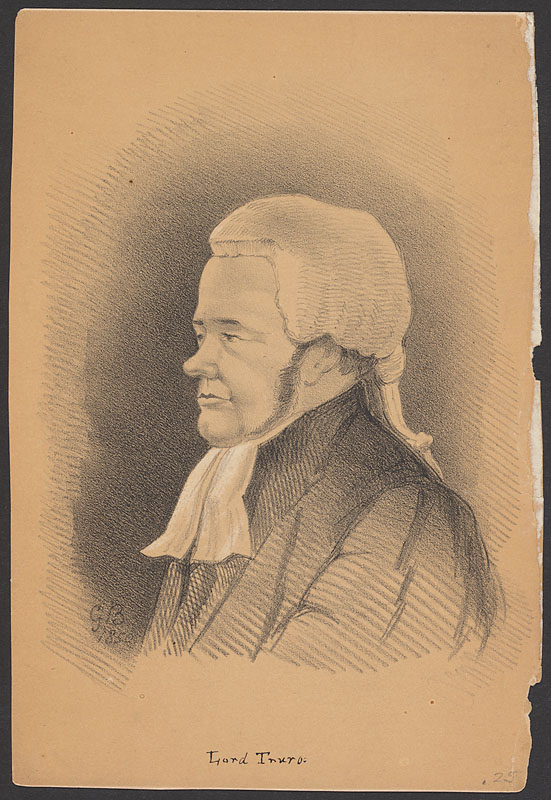
Thomas Wilde, 1st Baron Truro.

Baron Truro, of Bowes in the County of Middlesex, was a title in the Peerage of the United Kingdom. It was created on 15 July 1850 for Sir Thomas Wilde, the former Solicitor General, Attorney General and Lord Chief Justice of the Common Pleas. He became Lord Chancellor the same year. The title became extinct on the death of his grandson, the third Baron, on 8 March 1899. He was the son of Honourable Thomas Montague Carrington Wilde, youngest son of the first Baron, and had succeeded his uncle in the title in 1891.

James Wilde, 1st Baron Penzance, was the nephew of the first Baron Truro.

== Barons Truro (1850) ==
- Thomas Wilde, 1st Baron Truro (1782–1855)
- Charles Robert Claude Wilde, 2nd Baron Truro (1816–1891). Wilde was the second son of the first baron. Born heir as his elder brother had died in infancy before his birth. Married Lucy Ray, but died without issue. In 1861 he raised the 3rd Middlesex Artillery Volunteers, known as 'Truro's Tigers', and commanded them until his death. He also raised and commanded the 1st Middlesex Light Horse Volunteers (1861–67).
- Thomas Montague Morrison Wilde, 3rd Baron Truro (1856–1899). Nephew of the second baron, acceded to the barony as his uncle had died without issue. Married Alice Maunsell, but died without issue. The barony became extinct upon his death.

== Arms ==
Coat of arms of Baron Truro
Crest A hart lodged with a rose in its mouth Proper. Escutcheon Ermine on a cross Sable a plate on a chief of the second three martlets Argent. Supporters Two ermines Proper. Motto Equabiliter Et Diligenter (Steadily And Diligently)
