= Thomas Wilde, 3rd Baron Truro =

English cricketer

Personal information
- Full name: Thomas Montague Morrison Wilde
- Born: 11 March 1856; Manchester, Lancashire, England
- Died: 8 March 1899 (aged 42); Menton, Provence, France
- Batting: Right-handed
- Bowling: Right-arm medium

Domestic team information
- Years: Team
- 1881–1883: Marylebone Cricket Club

Career statistics
Competition	First-class
Matches	4
Runs scored	117
Batting average	23.40
100s/50s	–/–
Top score	37
Balls bowled	24
Wickets	0
Bowling average	–
5 wickets in innings	–
10 wickets in match	–
Best bowling	–
Catches/stumpings	2/–
- Source: Cricinfo, 14 September 2020

Sir Thomas Montague Morrison Wilde, 3rd Baron Truro (11 March 1856 – 8 March 1899) was an English first-class cricketer and barrister.

The son of Thomas Montague Carrington Wilde, he was born in Manchester in March 1856. He was educated at Harrow School, before going up to Trinity College, Cambridge. A student of the Inner Temple, he graduated from Cambridge with a Bachelor of Laws in 1878 and was called to the bar to practice as a barrister in July of the same year. He played first-class cricket for the Marylebone Cricket Club from 1881–83, making four appearances. Wilde scored 117 runs in his four matches, with a high score of 37.

He succeeded his uncle, Sir Charles Wilde, as the 3rd Baron Truro upon his death in March 1891. The barony became extinct upon Wilde's death at Menton in France in March 1899.

Peerage of the United Kingdom
Preceded by Sir Charles Wilde	Baron Truro; 1891–1899	Extinct
