= Thomas Wilde, 1st Baron Truro =

British lawyer and politician (1782–1855)

The Right Honourable The Lord Truro PC QS
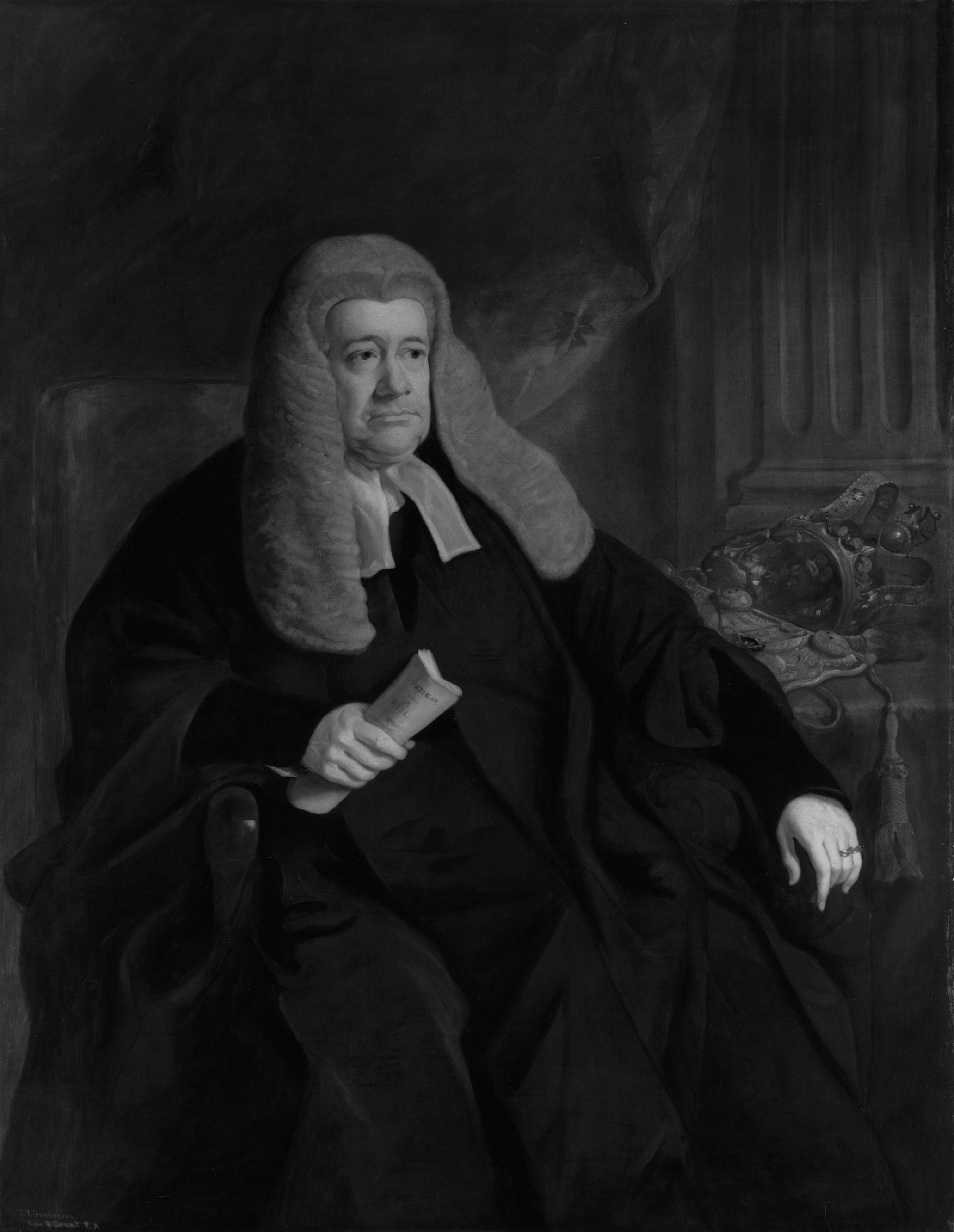

Lord Chancellor
- In office 15 July 1850 – 21 February 1852
- Monarch: Victoria
- Prime Minister: Lord John Russell
- Preceded by: In Commission
- Succeeded by: The Lord St Leonards

Personal details
- Born: 7 July 1782 Castle Street, London, England
- Died: 11 November 1855 (aged 73) Eaton Square, London, England
- Resting place: D'Este Mausoleum, St Laurence's Churchyard, Ramsgate
- Party: Whig
- Spouses: Mary Wileman (m. 1813; died 1840) Augusta d'Este (m. 1845)

Thomas Wilde, 1st Baron Truro, PC, QS (7 July 1782 – 11 November 1855) was a British lawyer, judge, and politician. He was Lord High Chancellor of Great Britain between 1850 and 1852.

== Background and education ==
Born in London, Truro was the second son of Thomas Wilde, an attorney, and founder of Wilde Sapte, by his wife, Mary Anne (née Knight). He was educated at St Paul's School and was admitted as an attorney in 1805.

He was the younger brother of Sir John Wylde and the uncle of James Wilde, 1st Baron Penzance.

== Legal and political career ==
Wilde subsequently entered the Inner Temple and was called to the bar in 1817, having practised for two years before as a special pleader. Retained for the defence of Queen Caroline in 1820, he distinguished himself by his cross-examination and laid the foundation of an extensive common law practice. In 1824, he was made Serjeant-at-Law, and in 1827 King's Serjeant.

He first entered parliament in the Whig interest as a member for Newark (1831–1832 and 1835–1841), afterwards representing Worcester (1841–1846). He was appointed Solicitor General in 1839, knighted in 1840, and became Attorney General in succession to Sir John Campbell in 1841. In 1846 he was appointed Chief Justice of the Court of Common Pleas, an office he held until 1850 when he became Lord Chancellor and was created Baron Truro of Bowes in the County of Middlesex. He held this latter office until the fall of the Russell ministry in 1852.

== Family ==
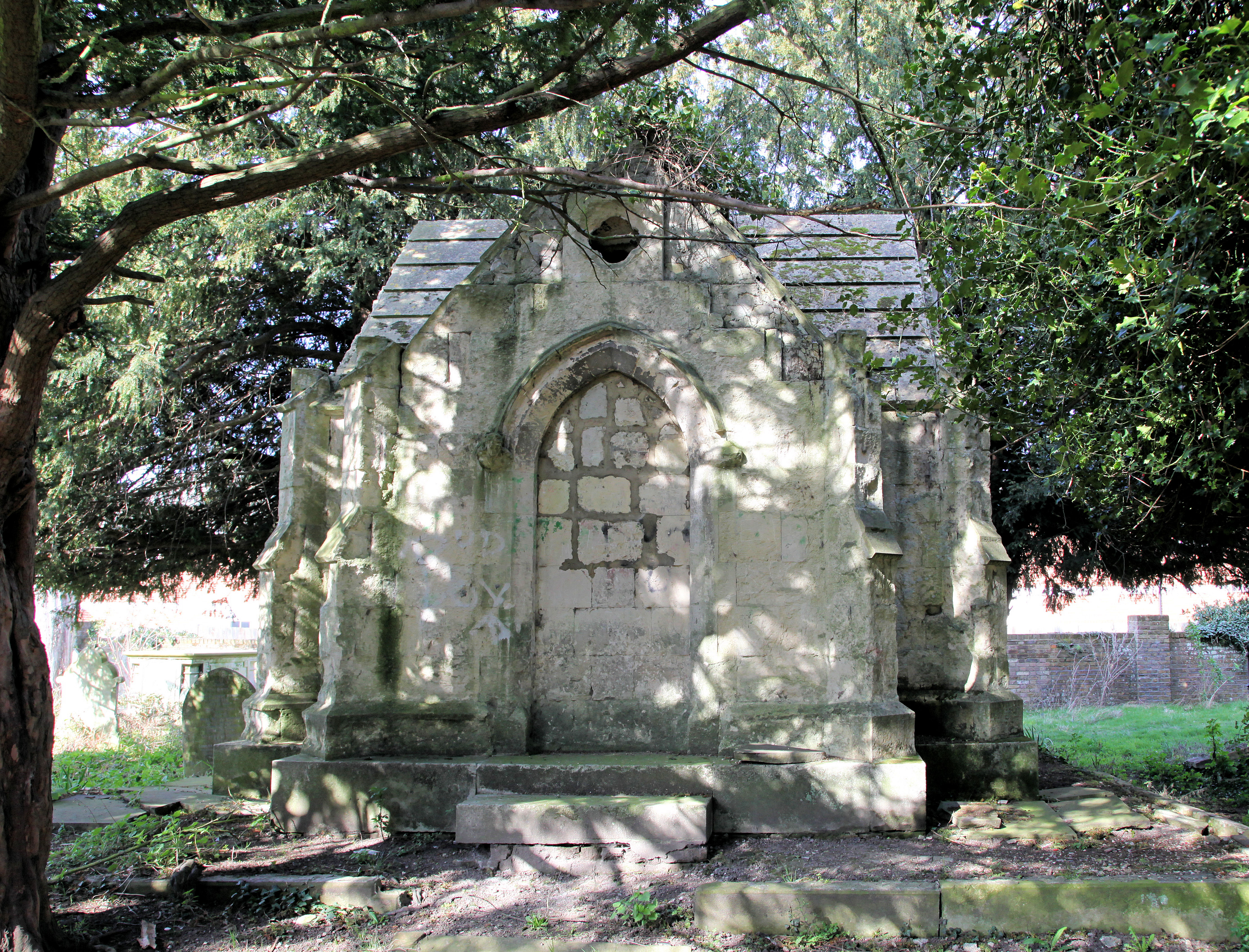
Thomas Wilde's tomb in St Laurence's parish churchyard, Ramsgate, Kent

Lord Truro first married Mary Devaynes in 1813 (the widow of William Devaynes (1730–1809) and daughter of William Wileman). They had three surviving children. After Mary died in 1840, he married Augusta Emma d'Este, daughter of Prince Augustus Frederick, Duke of Sussex and a first cousin of Queen Victoria, on 13 August 1845. There were no children from this marriage. Lord Truro died in London in November 1855, aged 76. He was succeeded in the barony by his second but eldest surviving son, Charles. Lady Truro died in May 1866, aged 64.

Thomas Wilde is commemorated by a Blue plaque erected on the front of 2 Kelvin Avenue Bowes Park London N13 which reads: "Site of Bowes Manor THOMAS WILDE 1st BARON TRURO 1782 – 1855 LORD CHANCELLOR 1850 – 1852 LIVED HERE"

Wilde also lived at Truro House, Broomfield Park, Palmers Green London N13, a Grade II listed building that dates to the mid-nineteenth century.

== Arms ==
Coat of arms of Thomas Wilde, 1st Baron Truro
Crest A hart lodged with a rose in its mouth Proper. Escutcheon Ermine on a cross Sable a plate on a chief of the second three martlets Argent. Supporters Two ermines Proper. Motto Equabiliter Et Diligenter (Steadily And Diligently)

== Notes ==
Parliament of the United Kingdom
Preceded by Michael Thomas Sadler; William Handley	Member of Parliament for Newark; 1831–1832; With: William Handley	Succeeded by William Ewart Gladstone; William Handley
Preceded by William Ewart Gladstone; William Handley	Member of Parliament for Newark; 1835–1841; With: William Ewart Gladstone	Succeeded by William Ewart Gladstone; Lord John Manners
Preceded by Thomas Davies; Joseph Bailey	Member of Parliament for Worcester; 1841–1846; With: Joseph Bailey	Succeeded by Sir Denis Le Marchant; Joseph Bailey
Legal offices
Preceded by Sir Robert Rolfe	Solicitor General; 1839–1841	Succeeded by Sir William Webb Follett
Preceded by Sir John Campbell	Attorney General; 1841	Succeeded by Sir Frederick Pollock
Preceded by Sir Frederic Thesiger	Attorney General; 1846	Succeeded by Sir John Jervis
Preceded by Sir Nicholas Conyngham Tindal	Chief Justice of the Common Pleas; 1846–1850	Succeeded by Sir John Jervis
Political offices
Preceded by The Lord Cottenham	Lord High Chancellor of Great Britain; 1850–1852	Succeeded by The Lord St Leonards
Peerage of the United Kingdom
New creation	Baron Truro; 1850–1855	Succeeded by Charles Wilde
