= Augustus d'Este =

English nobleman (1794–1848)

Sir Augustus d'Este KCH
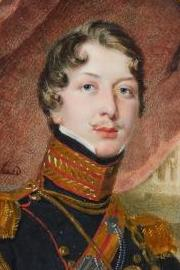
- Portrait c. 1815
- Born: Augustus Frederick Hanover; 13 January 1794; London, Great Britain
- Died: 28 December 1848 (aged 54); Ramsgate, Kent
- Parent(s): Prince Augustus Frederick, Duke of Sussex; Lady Augusta Murray

Sir Augustus Frederick d'Este, KCH (13 January 1794 – 28 December 1848) was the only son of Prince Augustus Frederick, Duke of Sussex and his wife Lady Augusta Murray. He was a grandson of George III, nephew of George IV and William IV, and a first cousin to Queen Victoria. He is the earliest recorded person for whom a definite diagnosis of multiple sclerosis can be made.

== Family and career ==
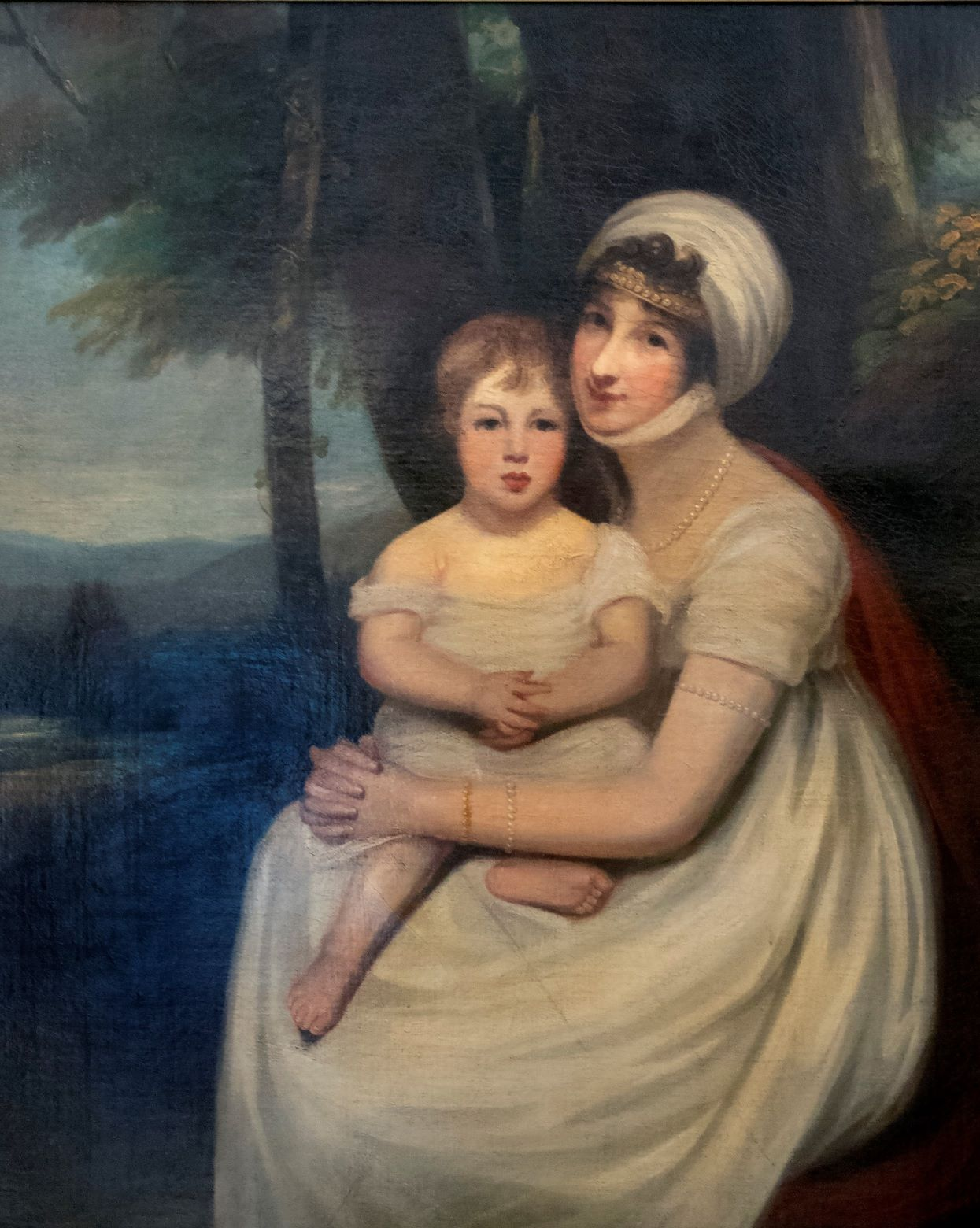
Lady Augusta Murray, holding her infant son, Augustus Frederick d'Este (ca 1795) by George Romney

D'Este was the son of Prince Augustus Frederick, Duke of Sussex, and Lady Augusta Murray, and a grandson of King George III. His parents were secretly married on 4 April 1793, in a Church of England ceremony in Rome at the Hotel Sarmiento, and later married again on 5 December 1793 at St George's, Hanover Square, Westminster, using their correct names but without revealing their identities. Both marriages were in defiance of the Royal Marriages Act 1772 and were thus legally null and void, at least in English law. After the birth of their first child, the marriage was discovered by the King and formally annulled, making their son illegitimate in Great Britain. Christened "Augustus Frederick", he was briefly given the surname of "Hanover", but later took the name d'Este. He attended Harrow School.

He was commissioned into the Army as a lieutenant in the 7th Regiment of Foot in 1811. He was promoted to be captain of a company in the York Chasseurs in 1815, shortly afterwards transferring to the 12th Regiment of Foot, and then to the captaincy of a troop in the 9th Regiment of Light Dragoons in 1817. In 1822 he purchased the rank of major in the 11th Regiment of Foot, exchanging into the 4th Regiment of Dragoon Guards later that year. He was promoted by purchase to lieutenant-colonel on the unattached list in 1824, and granted the brevet rank of colonel in 1838. In 1830 the new king William IV appointed him a knight commander in the civil division of the Hanoverian Guelphic Order and a British knight bachelor. He was also granted a civil list pension and made deputy ranger of St James's Park and Hyde Park.

An active member of the Aborigines Protection Society particularly interested in Native Americans, d'Este gave considerable assistance to Peter Jones, the Mississauga missionary and leader, who argued for Native Americans to have title to their lands in Upper Canada.

When his father died in 1843, Sir Augustus d'Este attempted to claim his dukedom of Sussex and other peerages, but the House of Lords decided against his claim, as the prince's marriage had been null and void. Although he had affairs with women, he never married and, therefore, even if he had succeeded to his father's titles, they would have become extinct on his own death.

With the encouragement of his father, D'Este courted his cousin Princess Charlotte of Wales, but she found his constant attentions a nuisance and asked her uncle to persuade his son to stop pursuing her.

After being rejected by Charlotte, D'Este expressed an interest in Princess Feodora of Leiningen, the step-daughter of his uncle the Duke of Kent. While Feodora did not have a great personal fortune, her relation to Victoria, the British heir presumptive, made her an eligible match. D'Este first proposed to her on the 2 December 1825 while Feodora was on a visit to Coburg to her grandparents. His proposal was rejected by Feodora, but he continued his attempts to court her by sending letters and even gave her a gold ring. Feodora again rejected his suit and declined the ring.

== Illness ==
Augustus d'Este is the earliest recorded person for whom a definite diagnosis of multiple sclerosis (MS) can be made. The course of his MS, which was not diagnosed during his lifetime, is known from the diaries he kept. D'Este left a detailed diary describing his more than 20 years of living with the disease. He began his diary in 1822 and it had its last entry in 1846; only to remain unknown until 1948. His symptoms began at age 28, with a sudden transient visual loss after the funeral of a friend. During the course of his disease he developed weakness of the legs, clumsiness of the hands, numbness, dizziness, bladder disturbances, and erectile dysfunction. By 1843 he was experiencing persistent symptoms including tremor and nocturnal spasms, and in 1844 he began to use a wheelchair. In his last years he was confined to his bed. Despite his illness, he kept an optimistic view of life.

== Ancestry ==
Ancestors of Augustus d'Este

8. Frederick, Prince of Wales
4. George III of the United Kingdom
9. Princess Augusta of Saxe-Gotha
2. Prince Augustus Frederick, Duke of Sussex
10. Duke Charles Louis Frederick of Mecklenburg-Strelitz
5. Duchess Charlotte of Mecklenburg-Strelitz
11. Princess Elisabeth Albertine of Saxe-Hildburghausen
1. Augustus d'Este
12. William Murray, 3rd Earl of Dunmore
6. John Murray, 4th Earl of Dunmore
13. The Honourable Catherine Murray
3. Lady Augusta Murray
14. Alexander Stewart, 6th Earl of Galloway
7. Lady Charlotte Stewart
15. Lady Catherine Cochrane
