= Hat Kata Noi =

Beach in Phuket, Thailand

Coordinates: 7°48′23″N 98°17′56″E

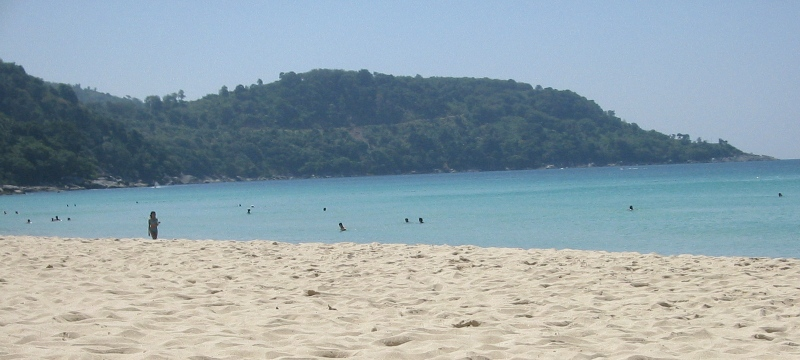
The beach and the bay at Kata Noi (December 2003).

Hat Kata Noi (Thai: หาดกะตะน้อย, pronounced [hàːt kā.tàʔ nɔ́ːj]; Noi meaning 'little' in Thai) is a beach on the southwest side of the island of Phuket in Thailand. It is adjacent to Kata Beach to the south. The beach is bordered to the north by the Mon Tri's Villa Royale Resort, and most of the beachfront is occupied by the resort of Kata Thani.

== 2004 earthquake and tsunami ==
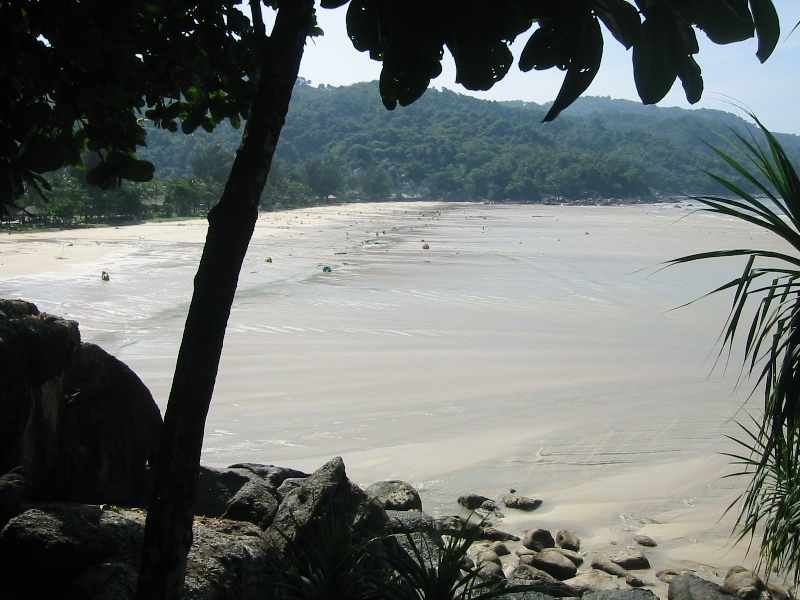
Maximum recession of tsunami waters at Kata Noi, before the 3rd, and strongest, wave (sea visible in the right corner, the beach is at the extreme left), 10:25 local time.

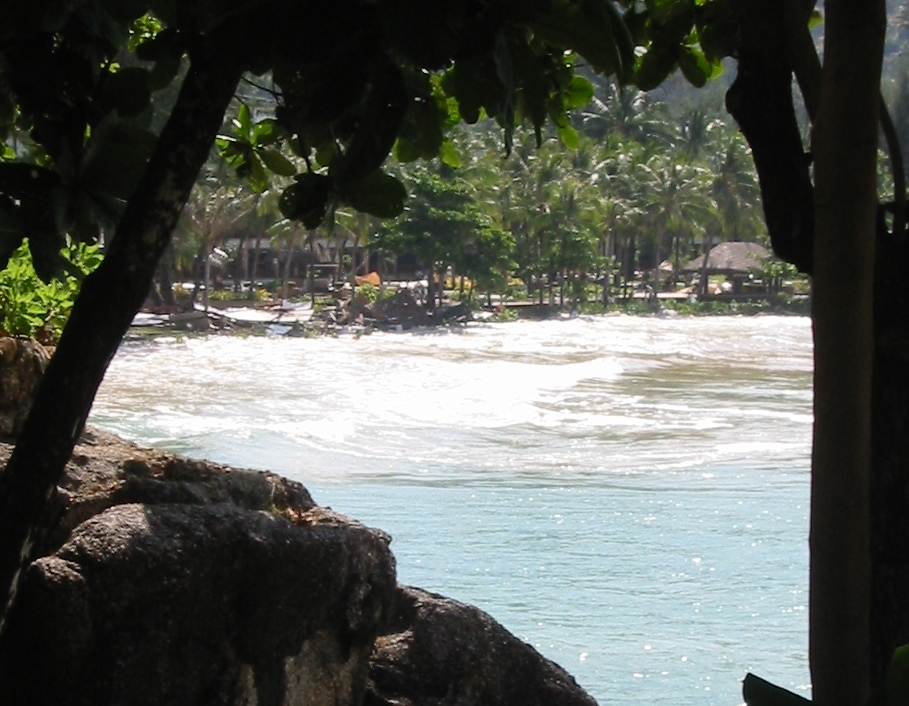
Approximate maximum rise of tsunami waters at Kata Noi (3rd tsunami wave), 11:00 local time.

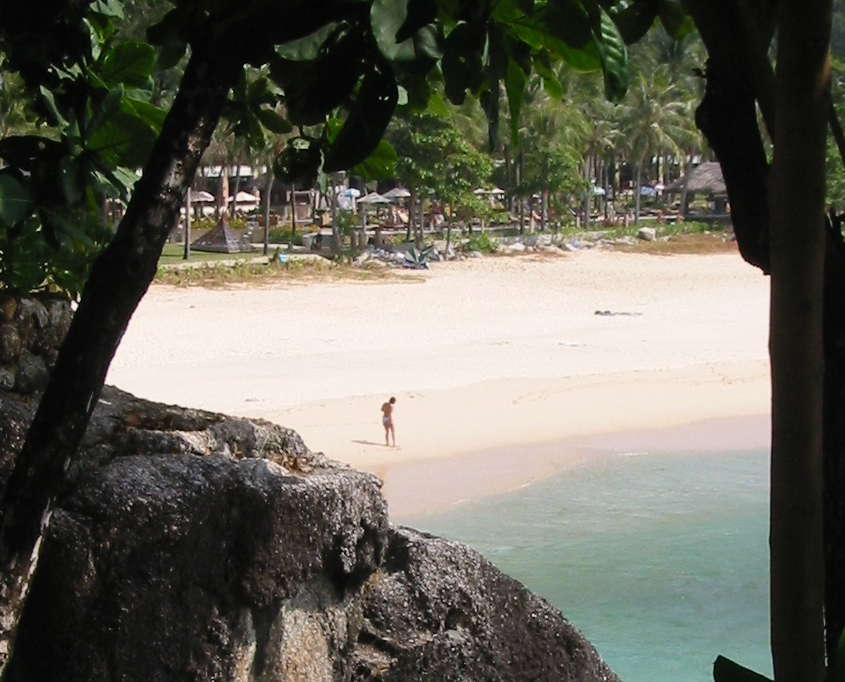
Regular sea level at Kata Noi Beach, a few days after the tsunami.

On 26 December 2004, the area felt a mild earthquake around 07:59 local time, which later turned out to be shock waves from the massive 2004 Indian Ocean earthquake occurring at that time near Sumatra. Few people actually felt the earthquake, and no alarm was given, apart from casual mentions on local Thai radio.

=== First tsunami ===
Around 09:30, as about 20 people were playing on the beach or bathing, the sea retreated about 100 meters within the space of about 5 minutes. A few people who were bathing, seeing the water retreating around them were left standing, puzzled. Asked about the phenomenon, Thai vendors on the beach were as puzzled as tourists, having never seen such a thing.

As the sea was staying at a very low level, quite far from the beach, people saw that some fish had been left stranded in pools of water, and started to play with the fish for possibly 5 to 10 minutes. Suddenly, without warning or visible signs of approaching danger, the sea rose again, inducing everyone to run to higher ground. The water continued to rise swiftly, although not as fast as the people running. Eventually the sea subsumed the beach, until it stopped almost exactly at the top of the one meter cement wall lining the beach. People who were in the sea up to their waists, were able to climb over the small wall to the safety of the gardens of the Kata Thani Resort, many leaving their possessions on the beach chairs in haste.

The sea stayed at its high level for possibly 10 to 15 minutes. Some tourists actually went back in the high water to fetch their floating belongings. The sea started to retreat again slowly, dragging parasols, beach chairs, and other flotsam with the receding water.

=== Retreat-and-rise cycle ===
The retreat-and-rise cycle was repeated several times that day, a full cycle taking between 30 and 45 minutes between each peak.

The third wave was the largest. It overran the small wall lining the beach, flowed into the gardens of the Kata Thani Hotel and almost instantly smashed into and destroyed the front rooms of the hotel, also inundating the central restaurant. The area at the southern end of the beach was most badly hit, and the beach restaurant was swept out to sea.

=== Casualties ===
There were some injuries, but no fatalities at Kata Noi. The waters receded and rose rather swiftly, but, owing to the steepness of the beach, remained contained and did not generate breaking waves as on flatter beaches such as Patong Beach or Khao Lak.

By 2014, Kata Noi beaches had returned to their pre-tsunami state.

== Images ==
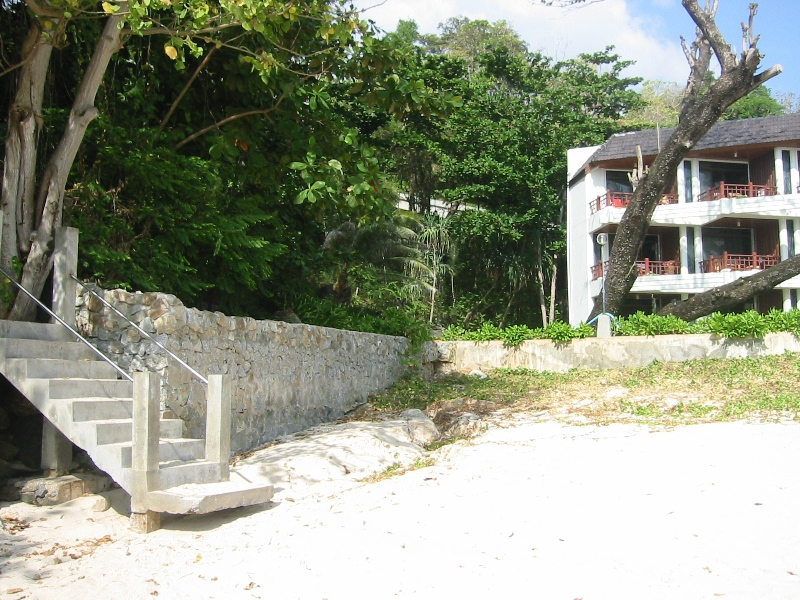
The first tsunami stopped exactly at the top of the beach wall

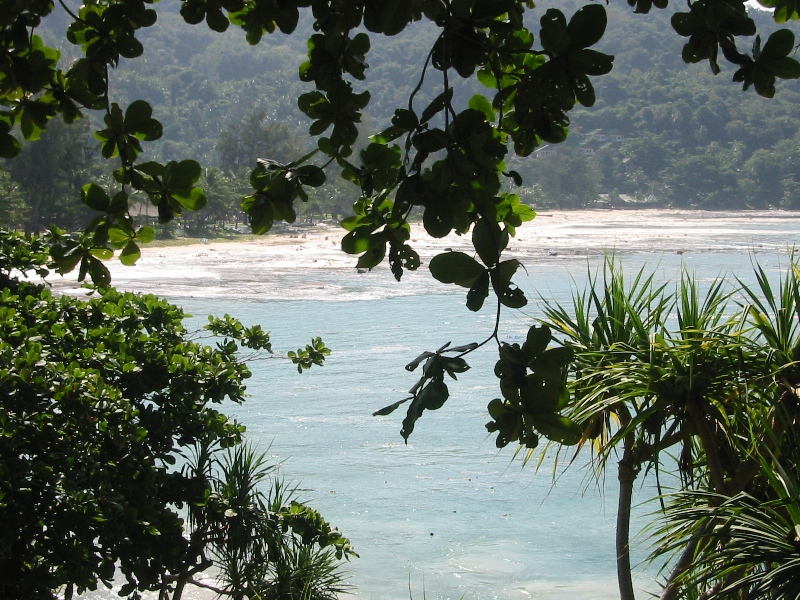
2nd tsunami wave, starting to retreat, 10:17

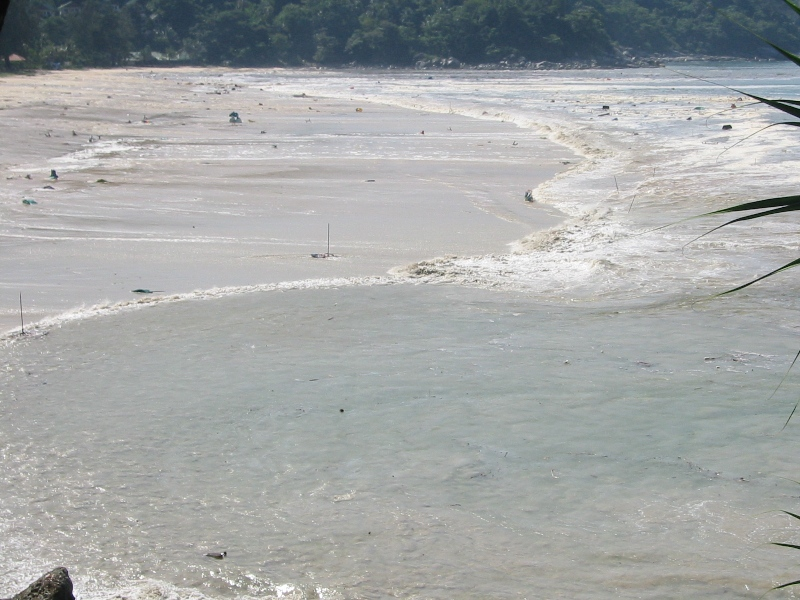
Receding waters after the 2nd tsunami, 10:20

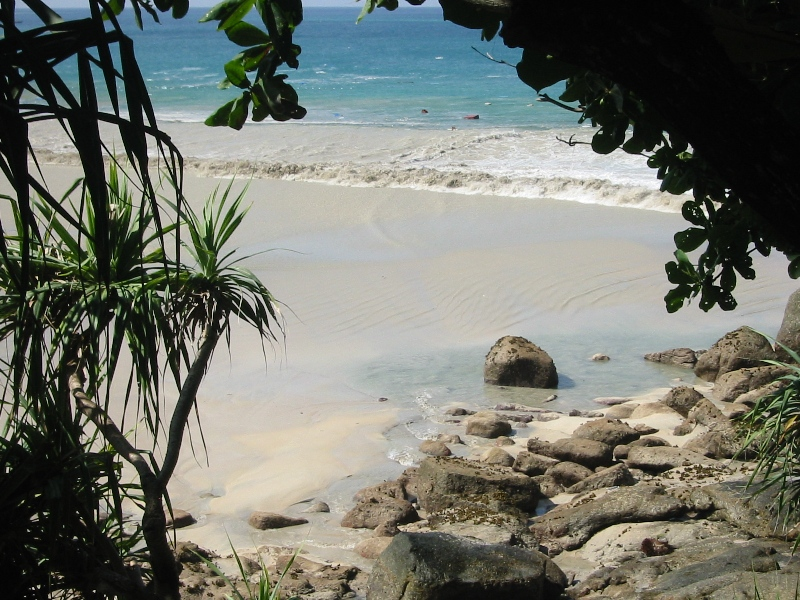
The waters at their lowest ebb, before the 3rd tsunami, 10:25

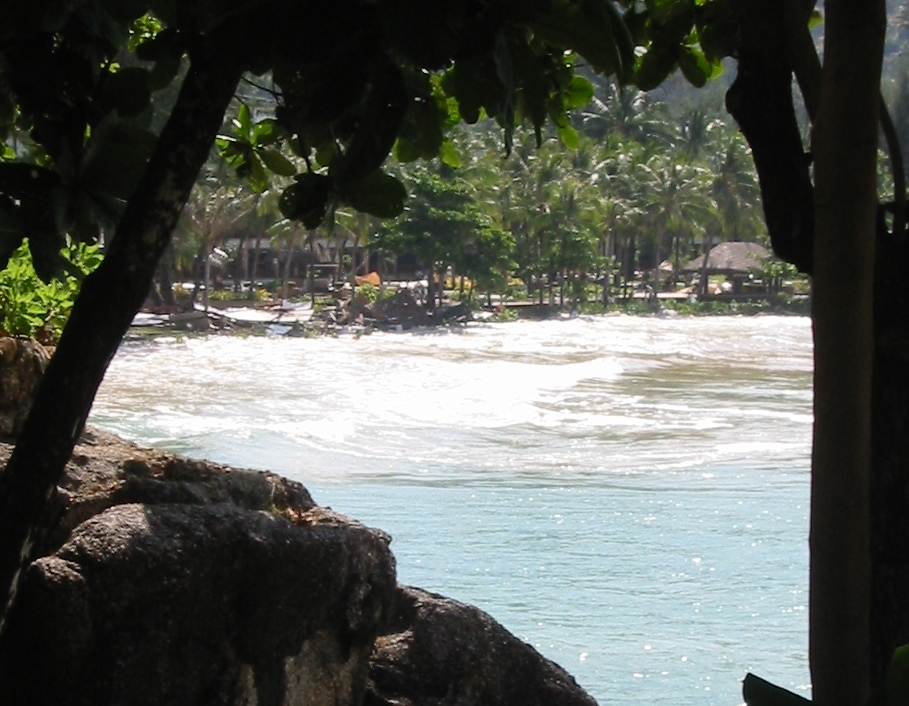
3rd tsunami wave, 11:00

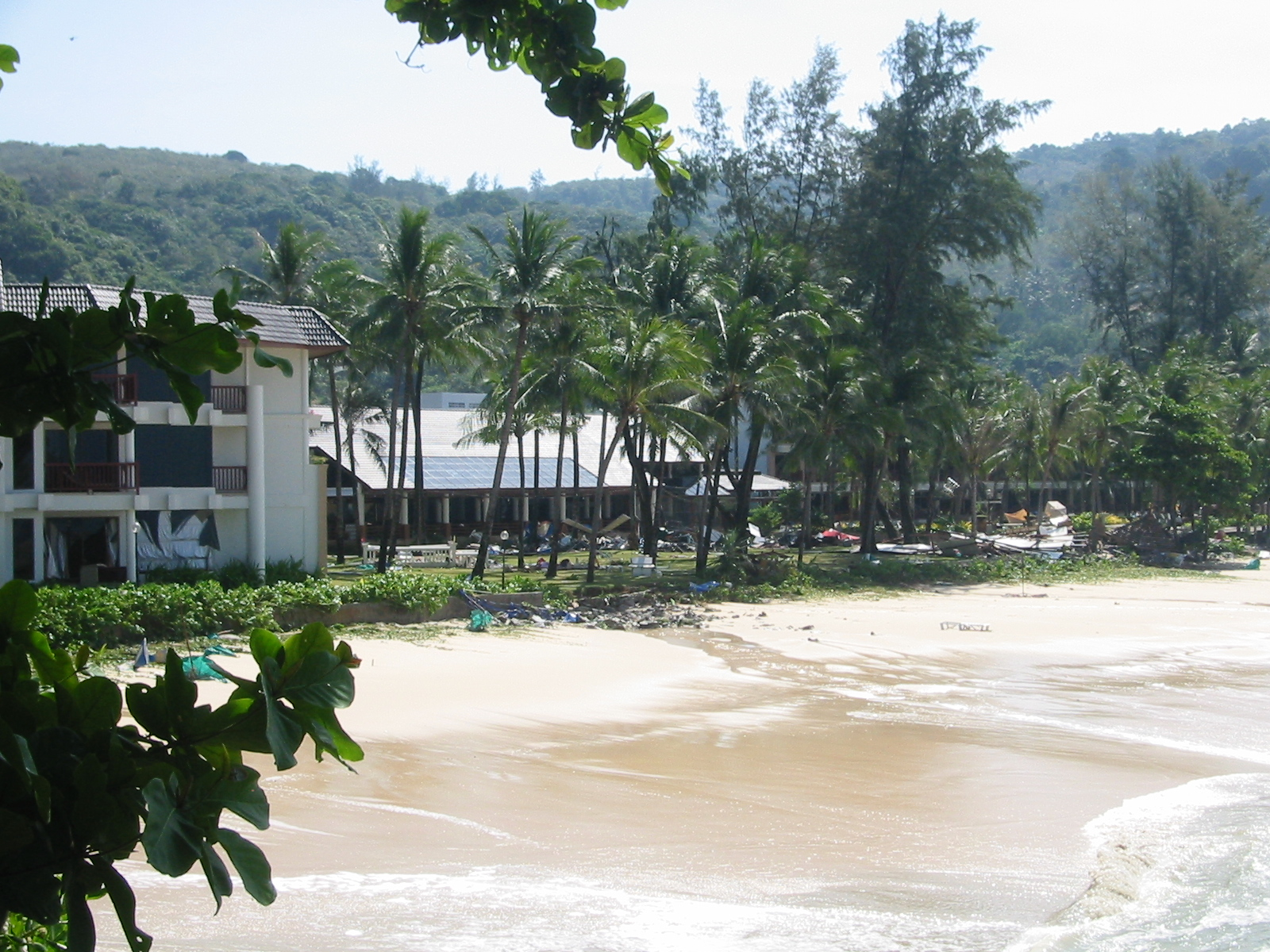
The 3rd tsunami wave retreating after invading Kata Thani, 11:03

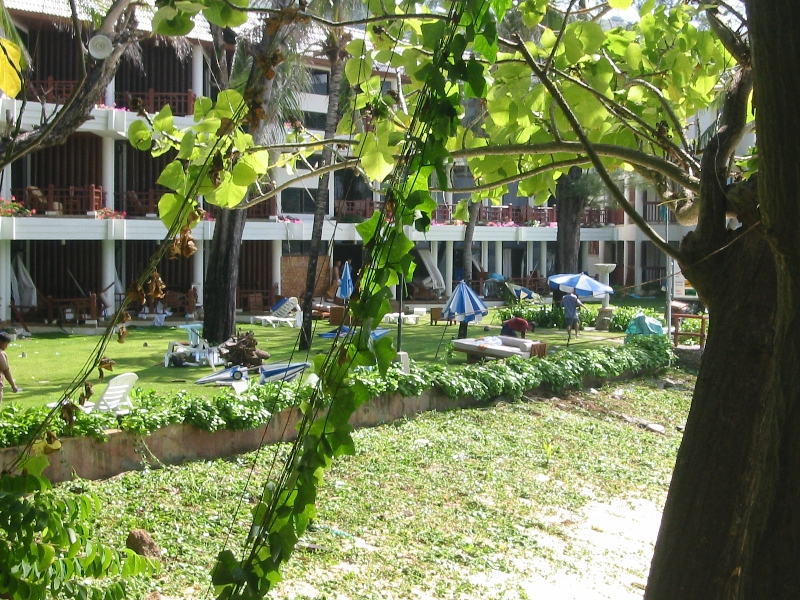
Smashed first-floor rooms, 11:04

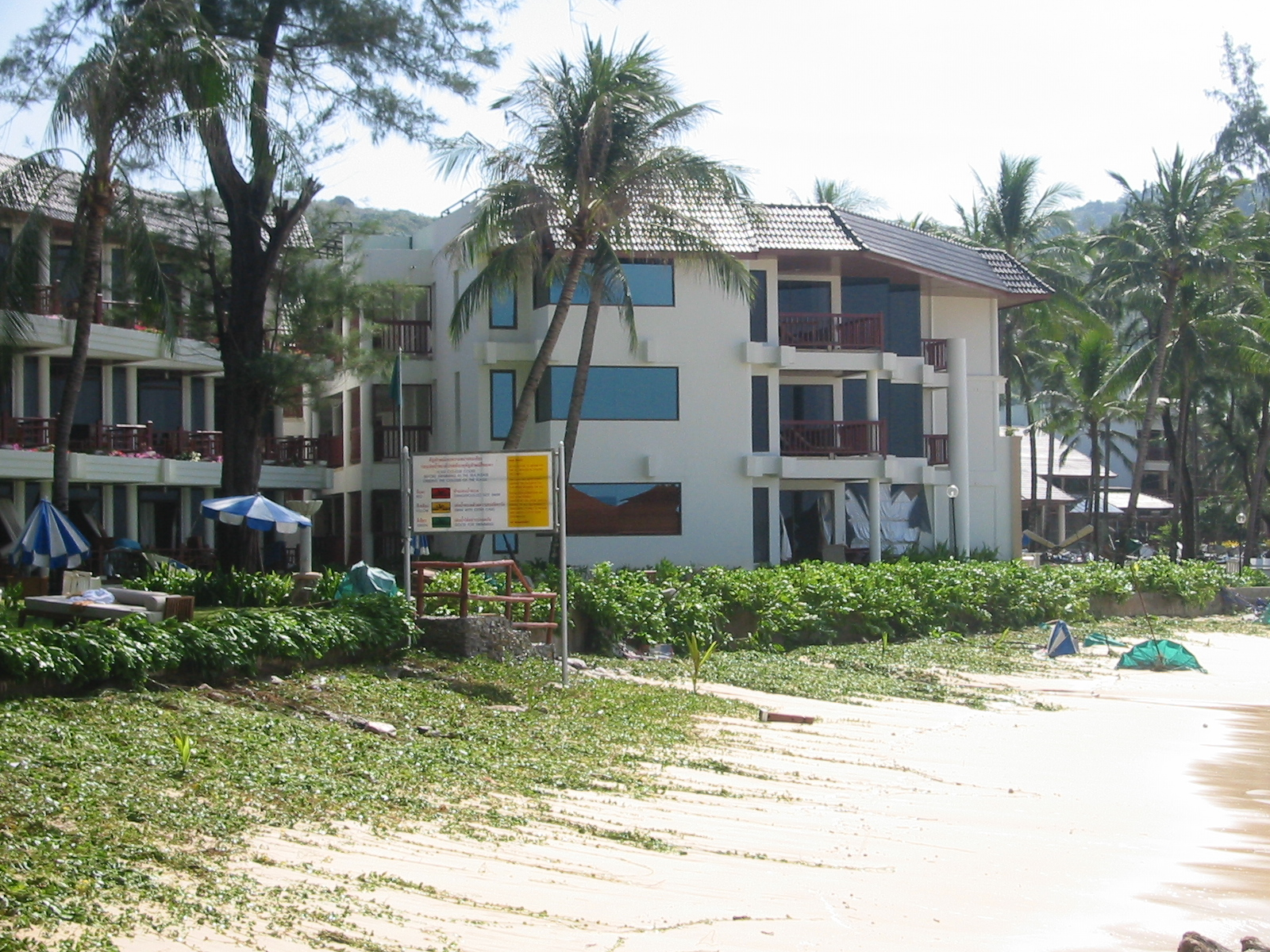
Smashed first-floor rooms, following the 3rd tsunami wave, 11:05

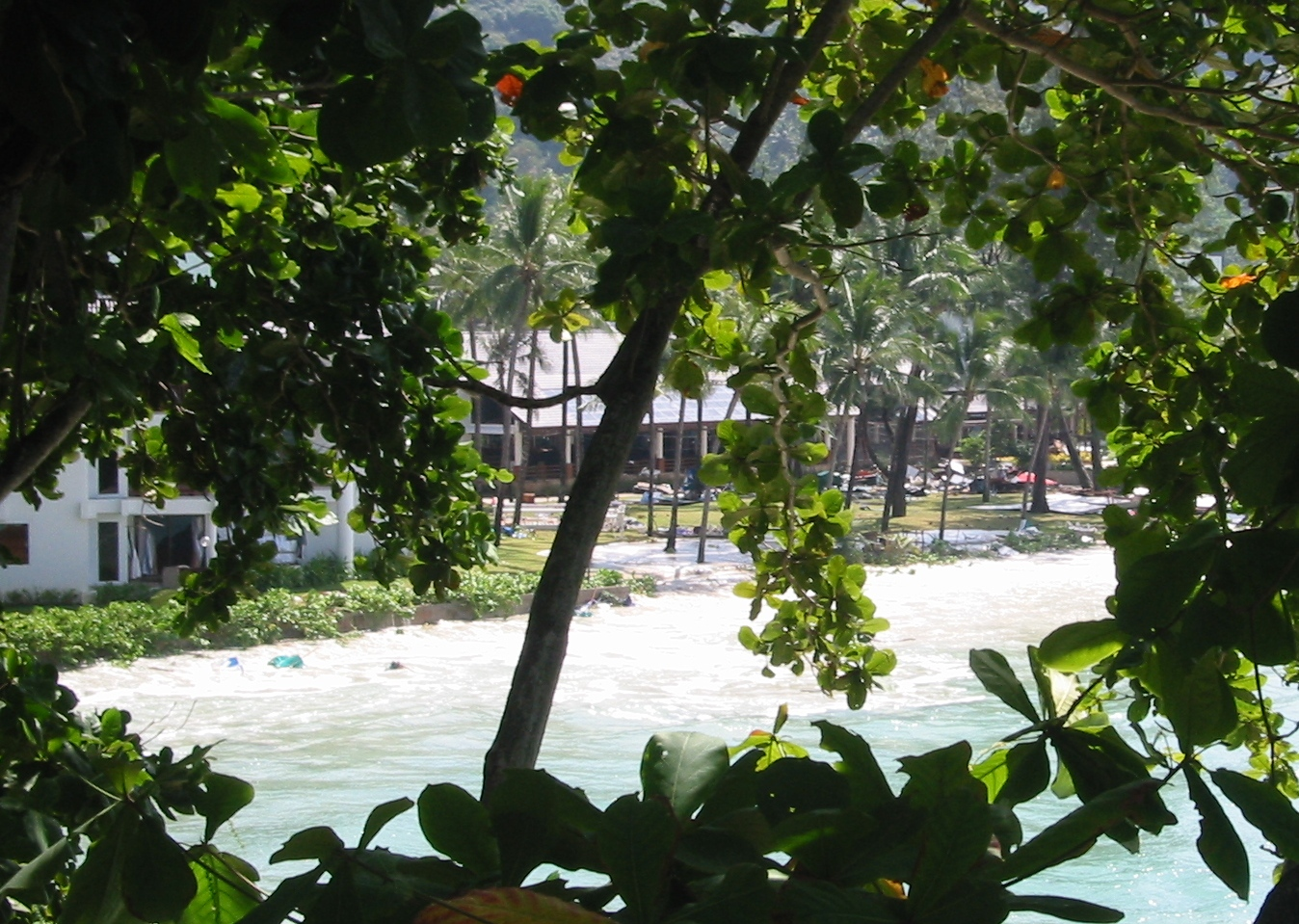
More large waves followed throughout the day (4th tsunami wave), 11:22

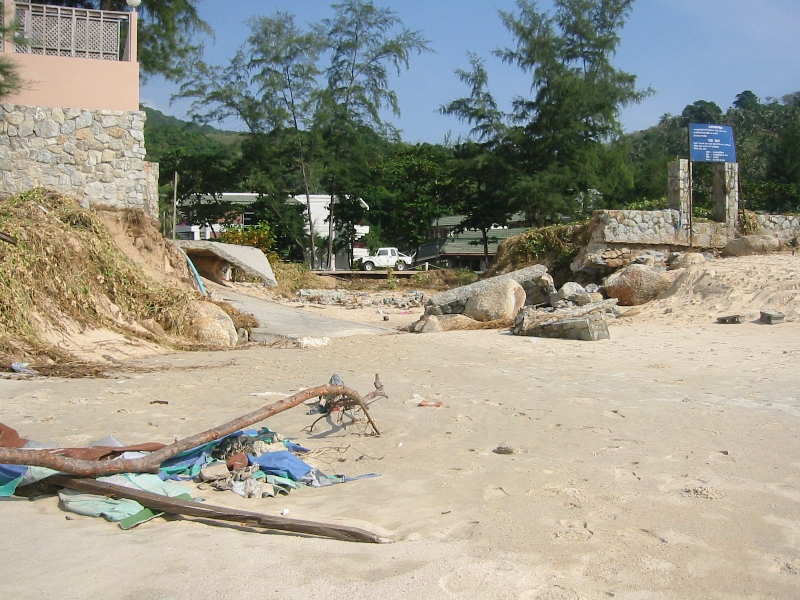
Destroyed beach access (about 2 meters of sand were washed away, leaving the access hanging in the air).

== See also ==
- Phuket Province
- 2004 Indian Ocean earthquake
- Tsunami
