= Hat Kata =

Beach on Phuket island, Thailand

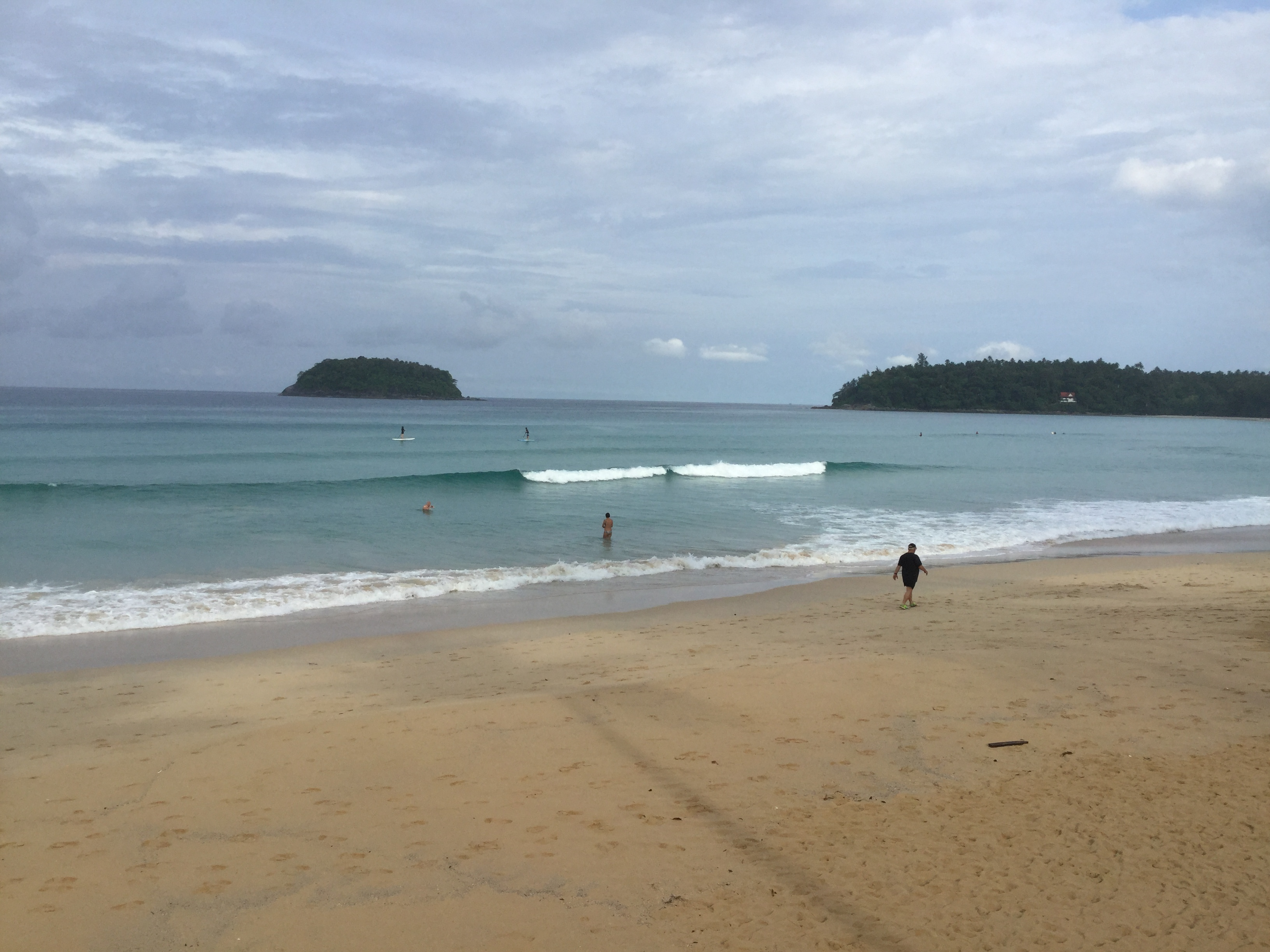
Kata beach

Hat Kata (Thai: หาดกะตะ, pronounced [hàːt kā.tàʔ]) is a beach which extends 1.5 kilometers on the west coast of the island of Phuket in Thailand. It is a tourist destination, with multiple hotels and restaurants near the beach.

== Geography ==
Hat Kata is about 17 kilometers from Phuket Town. It faces the Andaman Sea. The northern half of the beach is known as Hat Kata Yai, and the southern half as Hat Kata Noi.

There are two adjacent beaches called Kata Yai and Kata Noi. It is also relatively close to Patong Beach and Karon Beach.

== Events ==
Surfing is a popular activity at Hat Kara during monsoon season, and the location hosts the Phuket Surfing Contest annually in September.

The week-long Phuket King's Cup Regatta is one of Asia's biggest and most popular regattas.

== See also ==
- Phuket Province
