= James Wyatt =

English architect (1746–1813)

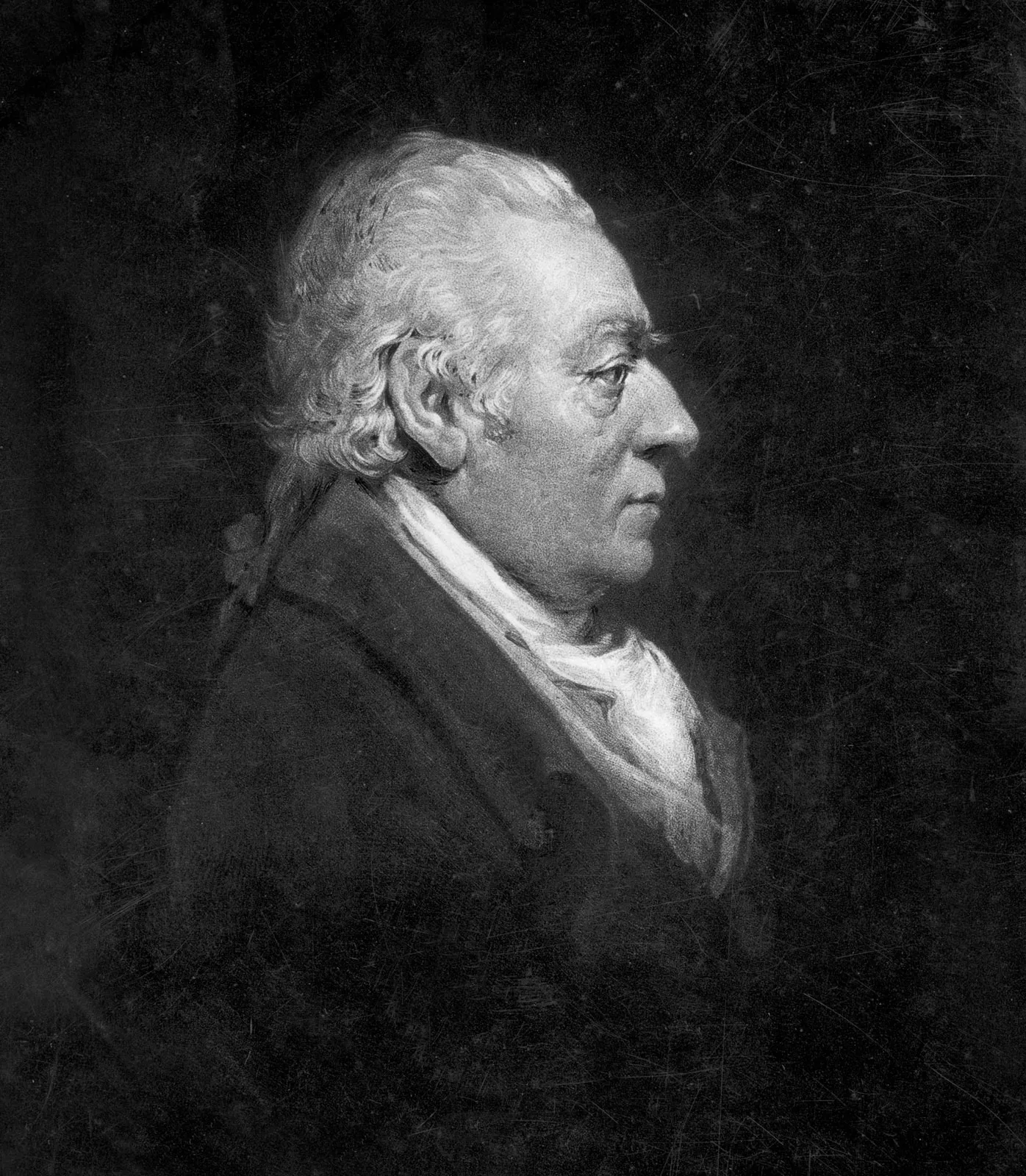
- 1800 portrait by Wyatt's son Matthew Cotes Wyatt
- Born: 3 August 1746; Blackbrook Farm, Weeford, Staffordshire, England
- Died: 4 September 1813 (aged 67); 2 miles east of Marlborough in carriage accident
- Occupation: Architect
- Spouse: Rachel Lunn
- Children: 4 sons, including Benjamin Dean, Matthew Cotes, Philip
- Buildings: Fonthill Abbey

James Wyatt PRA (3 August 1746 – 4 September 1813) was an English architect who was a rival of Robert Adam in the neoclassical and neo-Gothic styles. He was elected to the Royal Academy of Arts in 1785 and was its president from 1805 to 1806.

== Early life ==
Wyatt was born on 3 August 1746 at Weeford, near Lichfield, Staffordshire, England.

== Early classical career ==
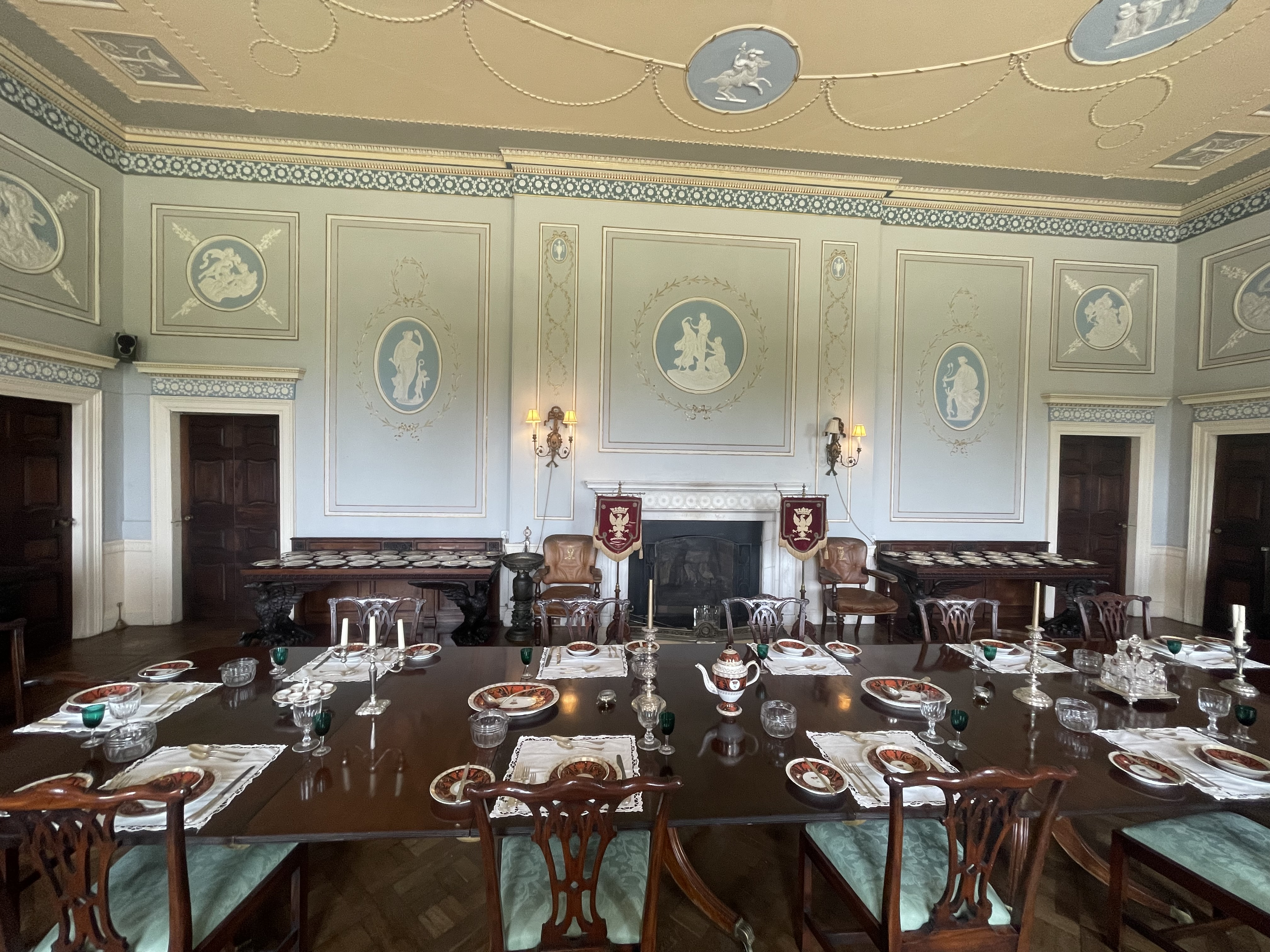
The Large Dining Room at Westport House, County Mayo was designed by Wyatt

Wyatt spent six years in Italy, 1762–68, in company with Richard Bagot of Staffordshire, who was Secretary to Charles Compton, 7th Earl of Northampton's embassy to the Venetian Republic. In Venice, Wyatt studied with Antonio Visentini (1688–1782) as an architectural draughtsman and painter. In Rome he made measured drawings of the dome of St. Peter's Basilica, "being under the necessity of lying on his back on a ladder slung horizontally, without cradle or side-rail, over a frightful void of 300 feet".

Back in England, his selection as architect of the proposed Pantheon or "Winter Ranelagh" in Oxford Street, London, brought him almost unparalleled instant success. His brother Samuel was one of the principal promoters of the scheme, and it was doubtless due to him that the designs of a young and almost unknown architect were accepted by the committee. When the Pantheon was opened in 1772, their choice was at once endorsed by the fashionable public: Horace Walpole pronounced it to be "the most beautiful edifice in England".

Externally it was unremarkable, but the classicising domed hall surrounded by galleried aisles and apsidal ends was something new in assembly rooms, and brought its architect immediate celebrity. The design was exhibited at the Royal Academy, private commissions followed, and at the age of 26 Wyatt found himself a fashionable domestic architect and on 27 August 1770 an Associate of the Royal Academy. His polished manners secured him friends as well as patrons among the great, and when it was rumoured that he was about to leave the country to become architect to Catherine II of Russia, a group of English noblemen is said to have offered him a retaining fee of £1,200 to remain in their service. His major neoclassical country houses include Heaton Hall near Manchester (1772), Heveningham Hall in Suffolk (circa 1788–99), and Castle Coole in Ireland, as well as Packington Hall, Staffordshire, the home of the Levett family for generations, and Dodington Park in Gloucestershire for the Codrington family. On 15 February 1785 Wyatt was elected an Academician of the Royal Academy, his diploma work being a drawing of the Darnley Mausoleum.

== Later classical work ==
In later years, he carried out alterations at Frogmore for Queen Charlotte, and was made Surveyor-General of the Works. In about 1800, he was commissioned to carry out alterations to Windsor Castle which would probably have been much more considerable had it not been for George III's illness, and in 1802 he designed for the King the "strange castellated palace" at Kew which was remarkable for the extensive employment of cast iron in its construction.

Between 1805 and 1808 Wyatt remodelled West Dean House in West Dean, West Sussex. Wyatt's work was remarkable because it is built entirely of flint, even to the door and window openings, which would normally be lined with stone.

In 1776, Wyatt succeeded Henry Keene as Surveyor to Westminster Abbey (in which year he was appointed Elizabeth, Countess of Home's architect on Home House, though he was sacked and replaced by Robert Adam a year later). In 1782 he became, in addition, Architect of the Ordnance. The death of Sir William Chambers brought him the post of Surveyor General and Comptroller of the Works in 1796.

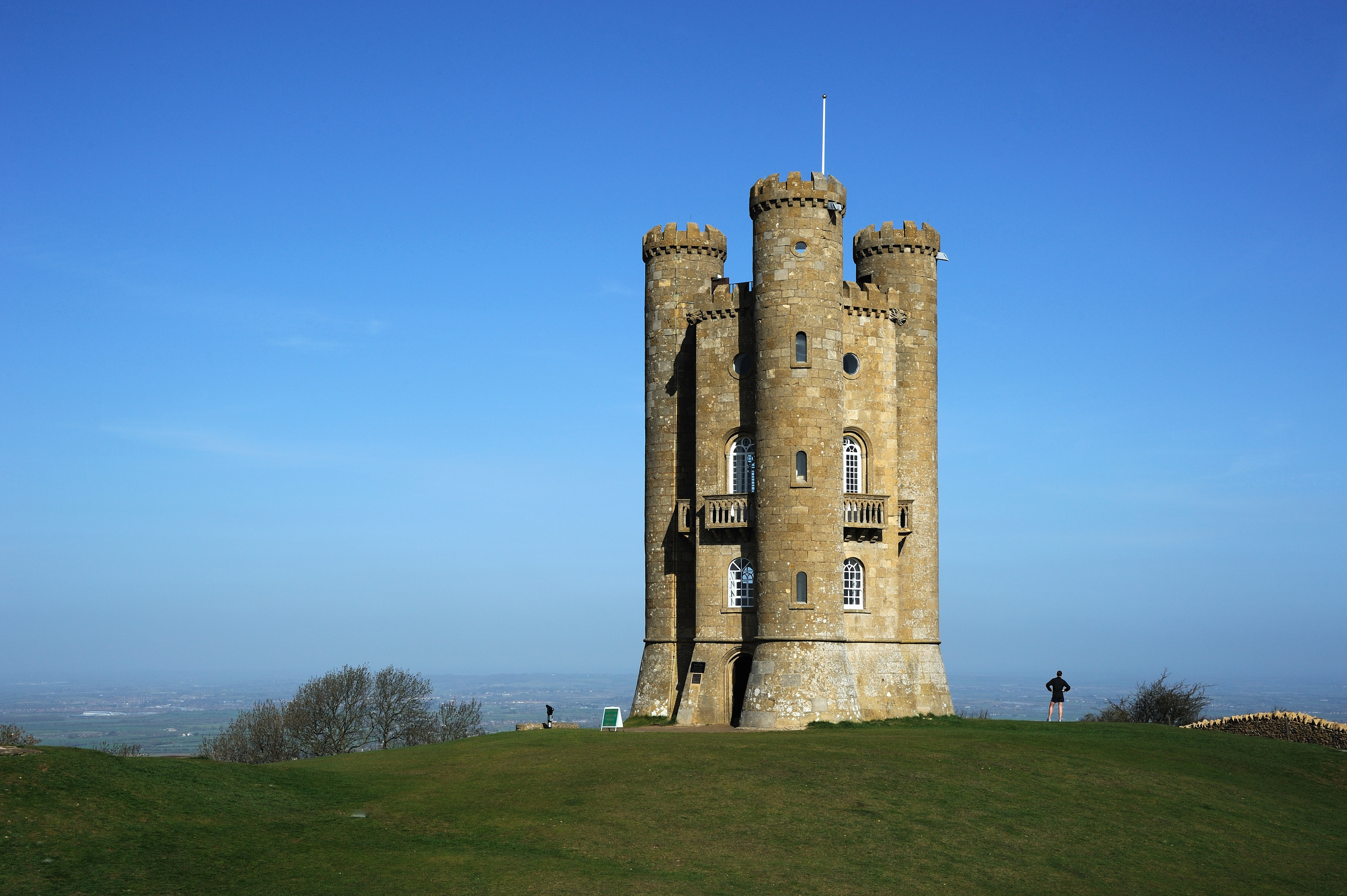
Broadway Tower, Worcestershire, designed by Wyatt in the 1790s

Wyatt was now the principal architect of the day, the recipient of more commissions than he could well fulfil. His widespread practice and the duties of his official posts left him little time to give proper attention to the individual needs of his clients. As early as 1790, when he was invited to submit designs for rebuilding St Chad's Church at Shrewsbury, he broke his engagements with such frequency that the committee "became at length offended, and addressed themselves to Mr. George Stewart". In 1804, Jeffry Wyatt told Farington that his uncle had lost "many great commissions" by such neglect. When approached by a new client, he would at first take the keenest interest in the commission, but when the work was about to begin he would lose interest in it and "employ himself upon trifling professional matters which others could do". His conduct of official business was no better than his treatment of his private clients, and there can be no doubt that it was Wyatt's irresponsible habits which led to the reorganization of the Board of Works after his death, as a result of which the Surveyor's office was placed in the hands of a political chief assisted by three "attached architects".

Wyatt's work is not characterized by any markedly individual style. At the time he began practice the fashionable architects were the brothers Adam, whose style of interior decoration he proceeded to imitate with such success that they complained of plagiarism in the introduction to their Works in Architecture, which appeared in 1773. Many years later Wyatt himself told George III that "there had been no regular architecture since Sir William Chambers – that when he came from Italy he found the public taste corrupted by the Adams, and he was obliged to comply with it". Much of Wyatt's classical work is, in fact, in a chastened Adam manner with ornaments in Coade stone and Etruscan-style medallions executed in many cases by the painter Biagio Rebecca, who was also employed by his rivals. It was not until towards the end of his life that he and his brother Samuel (with whom must be associated their nephew Lewis) developed the severe and fastidious style of domestic architecture which is characteristic of the Wyatt manner at its best. (Note: For an admirable analysis of the mature "Wyatt manner", see Arthur Oswald article on "Rudding Hall, Yorks"., in Country Life, 4 February 1949. The architect of Rudding itself is unknown.) But among Wyatt's earlier works there are several (e.g., the Christ Church gateway and the mausoleum at Cobham) which show a familiarity with Chambers' Treatise on the Decorative Part of Civil Architecture. Had he been given the opportunity of designing some great public building, it is possible that he would have shown himself a true disciple of Chambers; (Note: The influence of Somerset House is, in fact, apparent in Wyatt's rejected design for Downing College, Cambridge, of c. 1800 (see Gavin Walkley, "A Recently Found James Wyatt Design", R.I.B.A. Jnl., 12 September, and 17 October 1938).) but his career as a government architect coincided with the Napoleonic Wars, and his premature death deprived him of participation in the metropolitan improvements of the reign of George IV.

== Gothic architecture ==
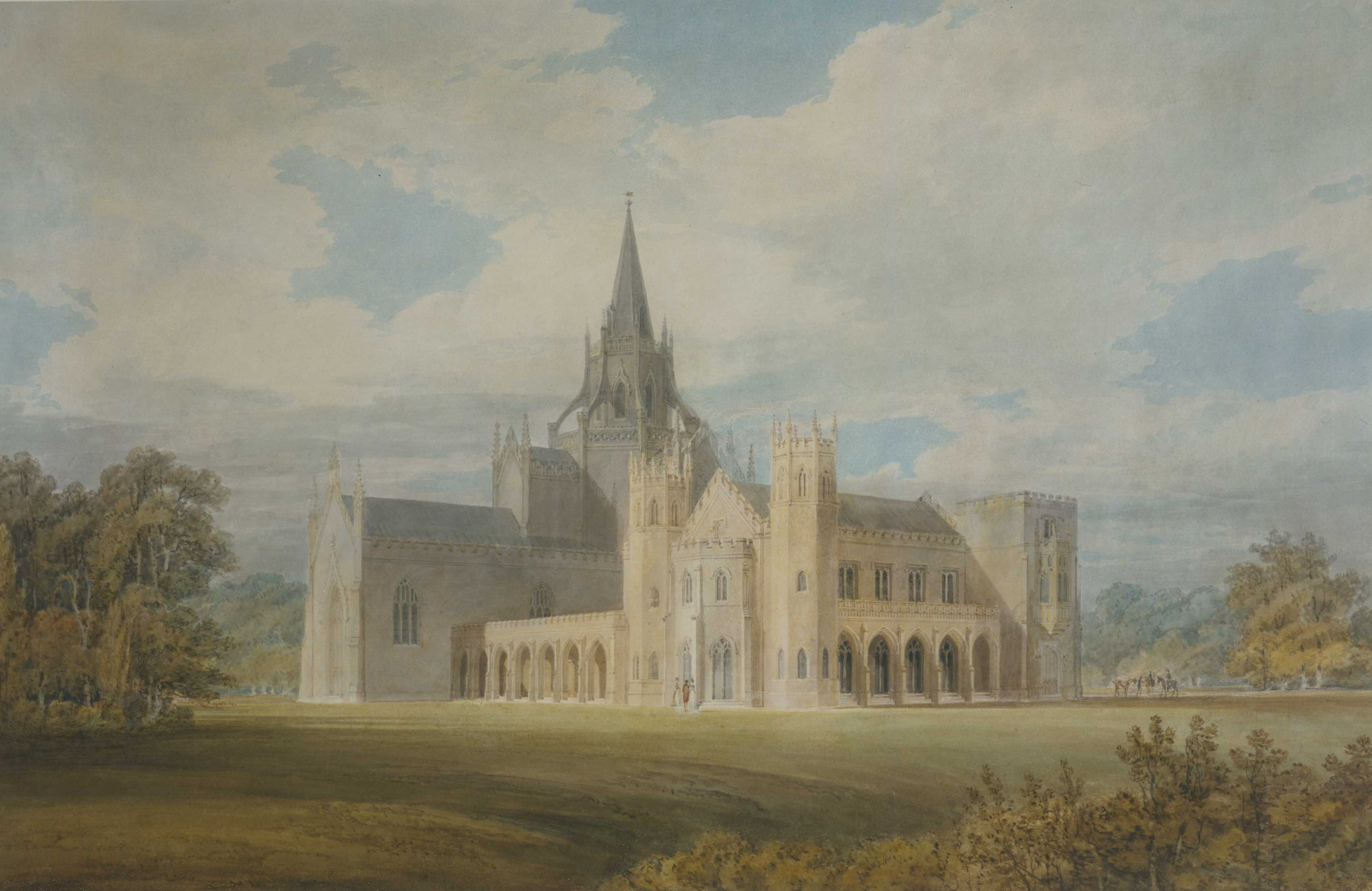
Fonthill Abbey, built 1795–1807 by Wyatt for William Beckford, the author of the gothic fantasy novel Vathek

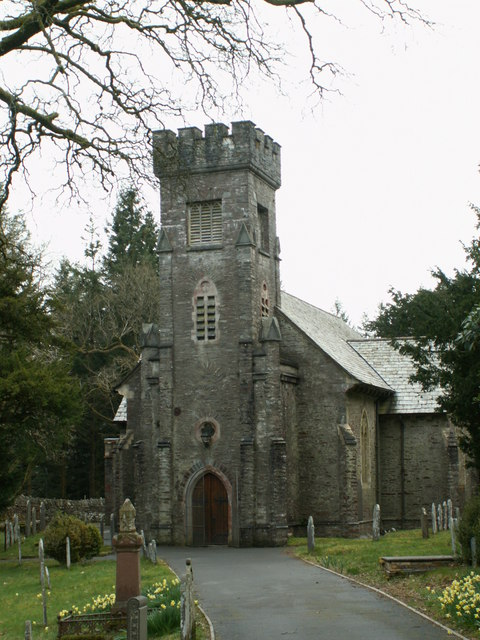
Saint Michael's church, Hafod

Meanwhile, Wyatt's reputation as a rival to Robert Adam had been eclipsed by his celebrity as a Gothic architect. Every Georgian architect was called upon from time to time to produce designs in the medieval style, and Wyatt was by no means the first in the field. However, whereas his predecessors had merely Gothicized their elevations by the addition of battlements and pointed windows, Wyatt went further and exploited to the full the picturesque qualities of medieval architecture by irregular grouping and the addition of towers and spires to his silhouettes. Examples are his Fonthill Abbey (Wiltshire) and Ashridge (Hertfordshire); and although crude in scale and often unscholarly in detail, these houses are among the landmarks of the Gothic Revival in England. In his lifetime Wyatt enjoyed the reputation of having "revived in this country the long-forgotten beauties of Gothic architecture", but the real importance of his Gothic work lay in the manner in which it bridged the gap between the rococo Gothic of the mid 18th century and the serious medievalism of the early 19th century.

His work on cathedrals at Salisbury, Durham, Hereford, and Lichfield was bitterly criticized by John Carter in his Pursuits of Architectural Innovation, and it was due in large measure to Carter's persistent denunciation that, in 1796, Wyatt failed to secure election as a Fellow of the Society of Antiquaries. In the following year, however, he was permitted to add F.S.A. to his name by a majority of one hundred and twenty-three votes.

Wyatt was elected to the Royal Academy in 1785, and took an active part in the politics of the Academy. In 1803 he was one of the members of the Council which attempted to assert its independence of the General Assembly of Academicians, and when the resultant dissensions led Benjamin West to resign the Presidency in the following year, it was Wyatt who was elected to take his place. But his election was never formally approved by the King, and in the following year he appears to have acquiesced in West's resumption of office. Wyatt was one of the founders of the Architects' Club in 1791, and sometimes presided at its meetings at the Thatched House Tavern.

In 1802, Wyatt built a new house for John Egerton, 7th Earl of Bridgewater on the Ashridge estate in Hertfordshire which is now a Grade I listed building. In 1803, Thomas Johnes hired Wyatt to design Saint Michel's Hafod Church, Eglwys Newydd, in Ceredigion, Wales.

== Family and death ==
Wyatt died on 4 September 1813 as the result of an accident to the carriage in which he was travelling over the Marlborough Downs with his friend and employer, Christopher Bethell-Codrington of Dodington Park. He was buried in Westminster Abbey.

He left a widow and four sons, of whom the eldest, Benjamin Dean, and the youngest, Philip, were notable architects. Matthew Cotes (1777–1862), the second son, became a well-known sculptor, whose best work is the bronze statue of George III in Cockspur Street off Trafalgar Square. Charles, the third son, was for a time in the service of the East India Company at Calcutta, but returned to England in 1801; nothing is known of his later career. His nephew Jeffry Wyatville was a noted architect, known for the renovation of Windsor Castle.

== Pupils and employees ==
He had many pupils, of whom the following is an incomplete list: William Atkinson; W. Blogg; H. Brown; Joseph Dixon (perhaps a son of the draughtsman); John Foster, junior of Liverpool; J. M. Gandy; C. Humfrey; Henry Kitchen; James Wright Sanderson; R. Smith; Thomas and John Westmacott; M. Wynn; and his sons Benjamin and Philip Wyatt. Michael Gandy and P. J. Gandy-Deering were also in his office for a time.

Wyatt's principal draughtsman was Joseph Dixon, who, according to Farington, had been with him from the time of the building of the Pantheon.

== List of architectural works ==
Wyatt's known works include the following.

=== Public buildings ===
- The Pantheon, Oxford St, London, 1770–1772, demolished 1937
- Christ Church, Oxford, north and east sides of the Canterbury Quad, including the gate 1773–83
- Radcliffe Observatory, Oxford, 1776–94
- Brasenose College, Oxford, redecorated the Library 1779–80
- Holywell Music Room, Oxford, remodelled interior 1780
- The Assembly Rooms, Chichester, Sussex, 1783
- Worcester College, Oxford, interiors of the chapel and hall 1783, the chapel was redecorated by William Burges
- Royal Arsenal, Woolwich, various buildings for the Board of Ordnance, 1783–1807
- Oriel College, Oxford, the library and alterations to the provost's rooms 1788–91
- Liverpool Town Hall, interiors 1783–1813
- New College, Oxford, alterations to the Hall, Chapel & Library 1789–94
- Merton College, Oxford, rebuilt Hall 1790–1794, again rebuilt by Sir George Gilbert Scott 1872-4
- Lincoln's Inn, London, repairs to the chapel roof 1791
- Balliol College, Oxford, rebuilt hall and redecorated the library 1792
- Magdalen College, Oxford, alterations to the hall and chapel 1792-5
- Royal Military Academy, Woolwich, 1796–1805
- Royal Artillery Barracks, Woolwich, 1796-7
- Palace of Westminster, restoration of the House of Lords 1800–1813, burnt 1834
- Ripon Town Hall, Yorkshire, 1801
- The King's Bench Prison, London, restoration and alterations 1803–1804, demolished
- The Marshalsea Prison, London, restoration and alterations 1803–1805, demolished
- Fenham Barracks, Newcastle upon Tyne, 1804–1806
- The Naval Arsenal, Great Yarmouth, Norfolk 1806, demolished 1829
- The Armoury, Shrewsbury 1806
- The Royal Military College, Sandhurst, Berkshire, 1807–12 executed by John Sanders who modified the design, most notably using Greek Doric for the portico
- Dorset House, Whitehall, London, adaptation as government offices 1808, demolished
- The Market Cross, Devizes, Wiltshire, 1814
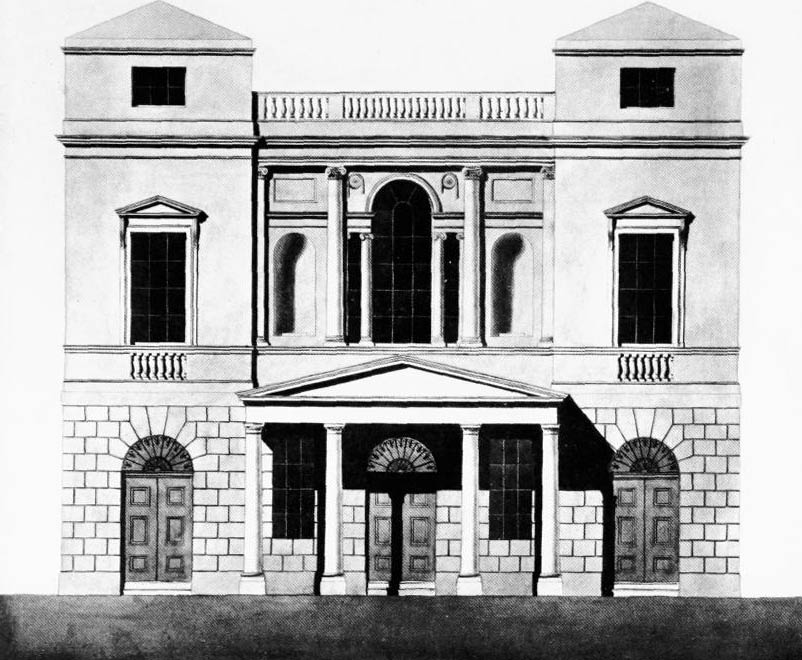
Pantheon Oxford St, Entrance Façade

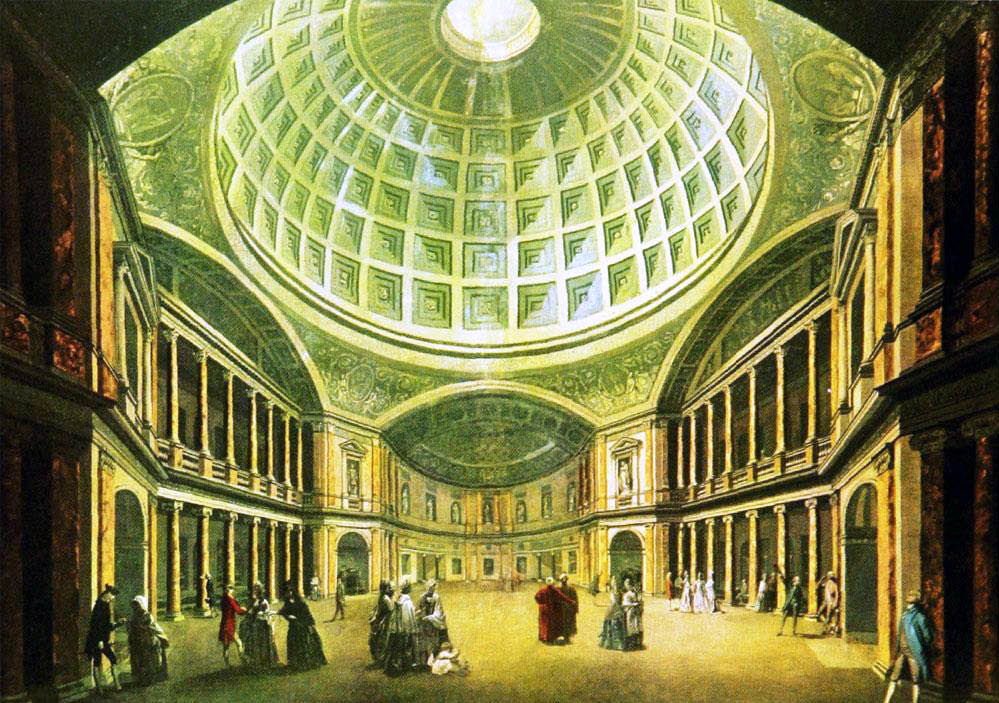
Pantheon Oxford St, interior

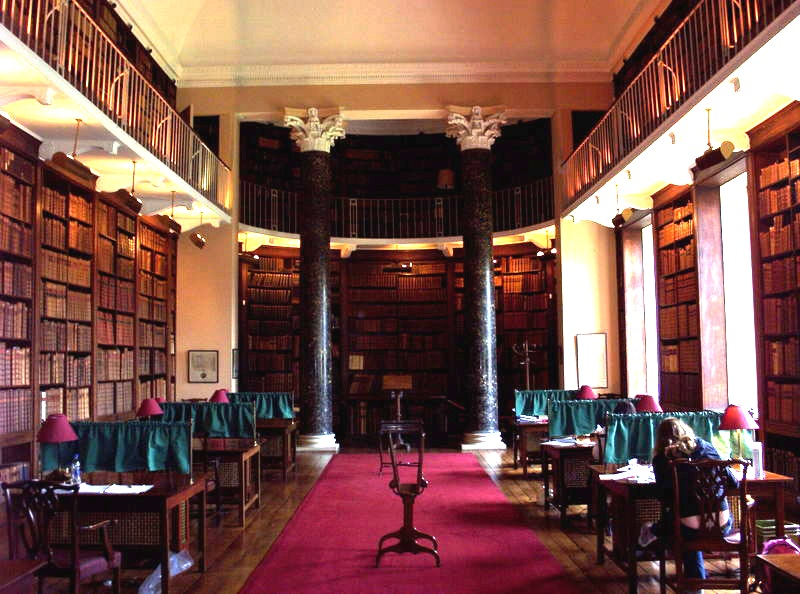
Oriel College Library, Oxford, interior

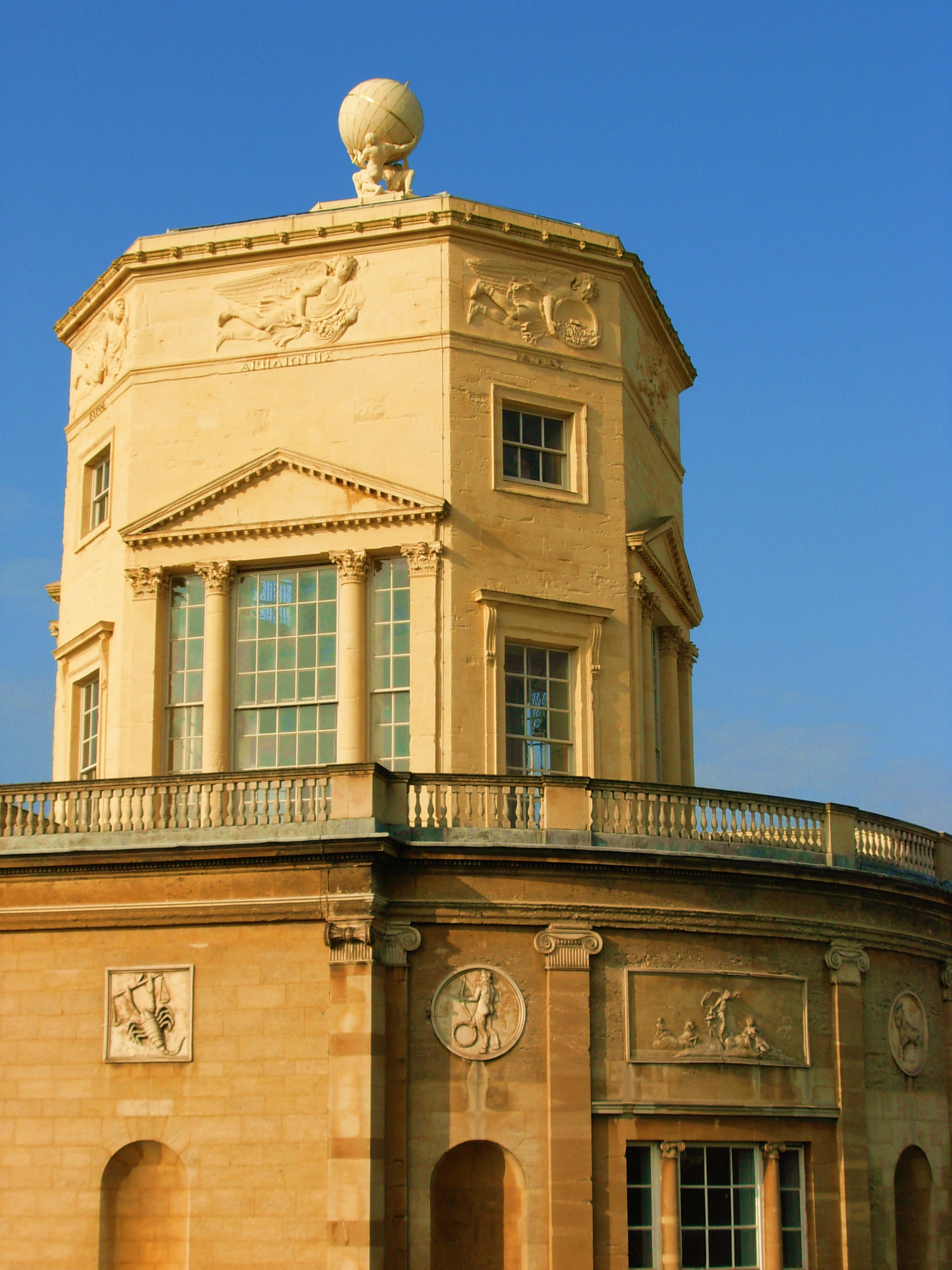
Former Radcliffe Observatory, Oxford

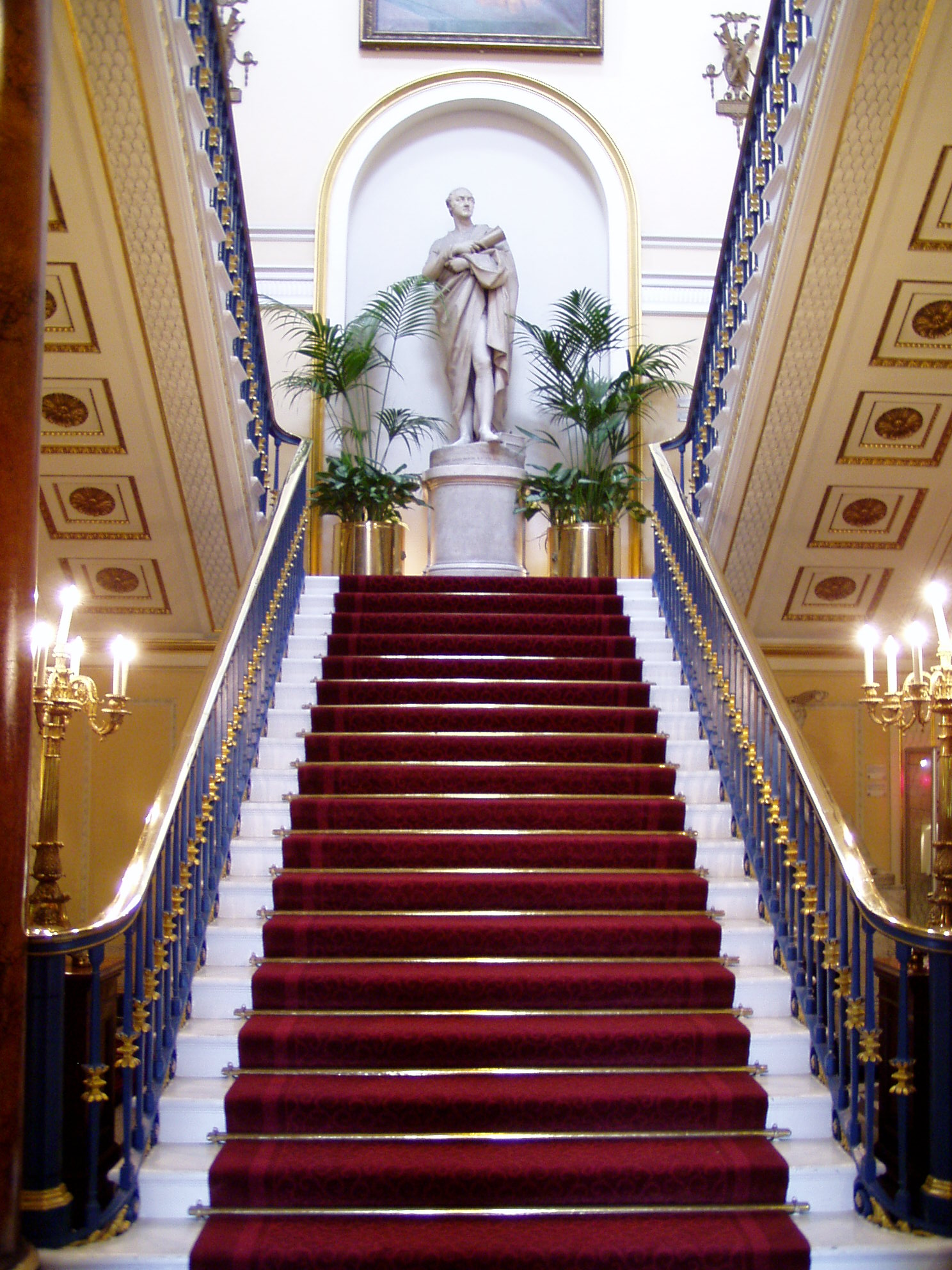
Staircase, Liverpool Town Hall

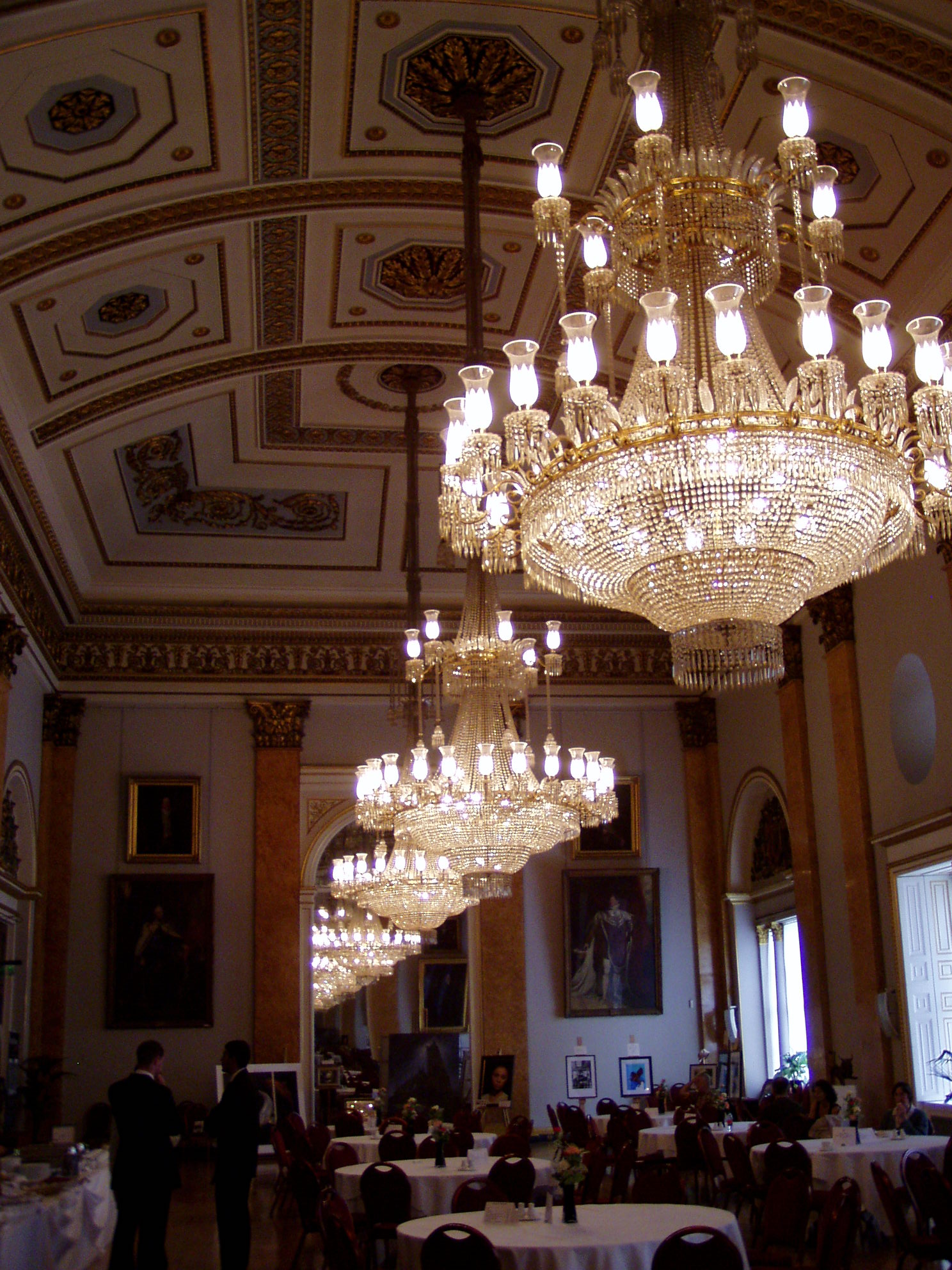
Large Ballroom, Liverpool Town Hall

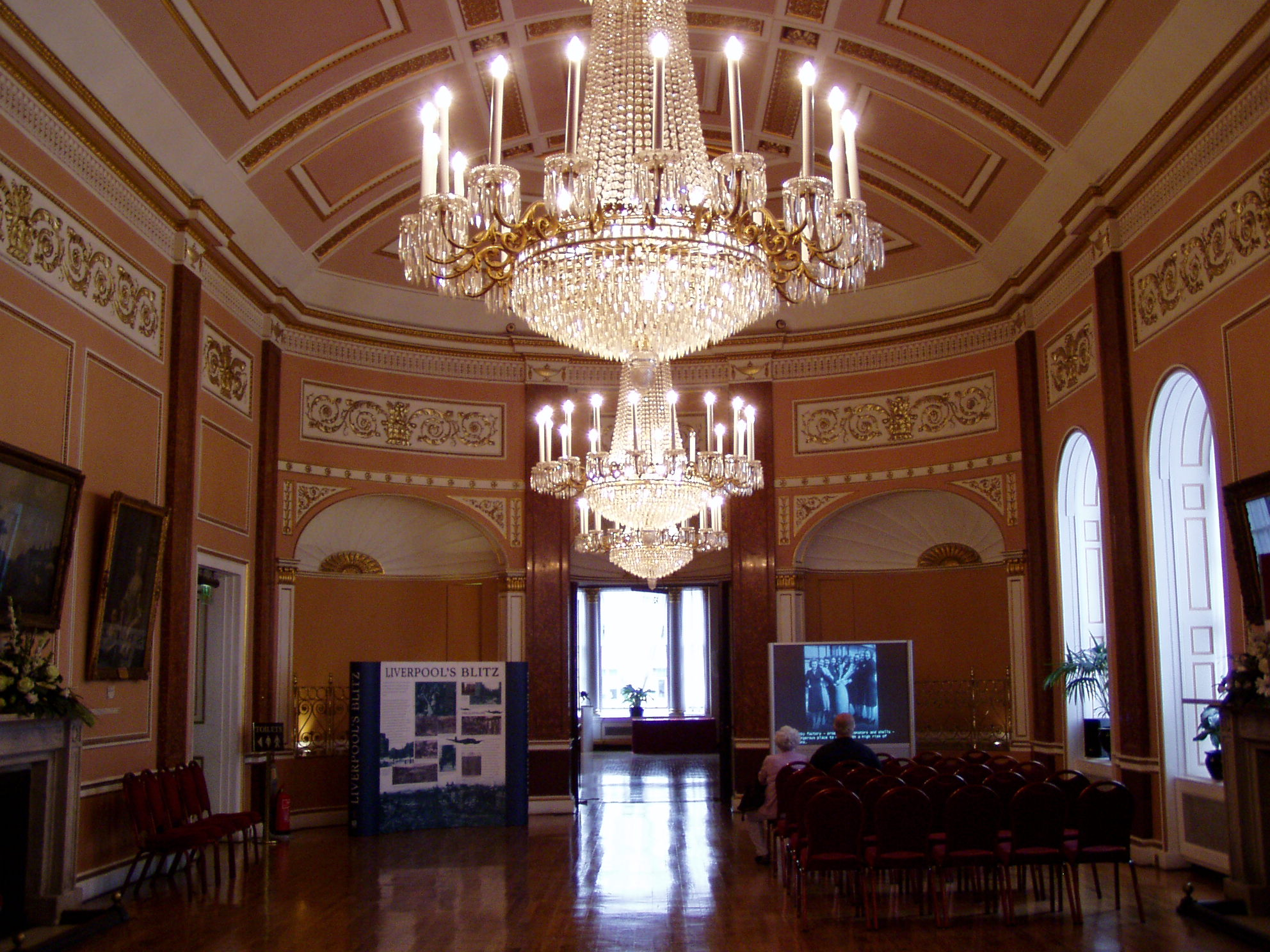
Small Ballroom, Liverpool Town Hall

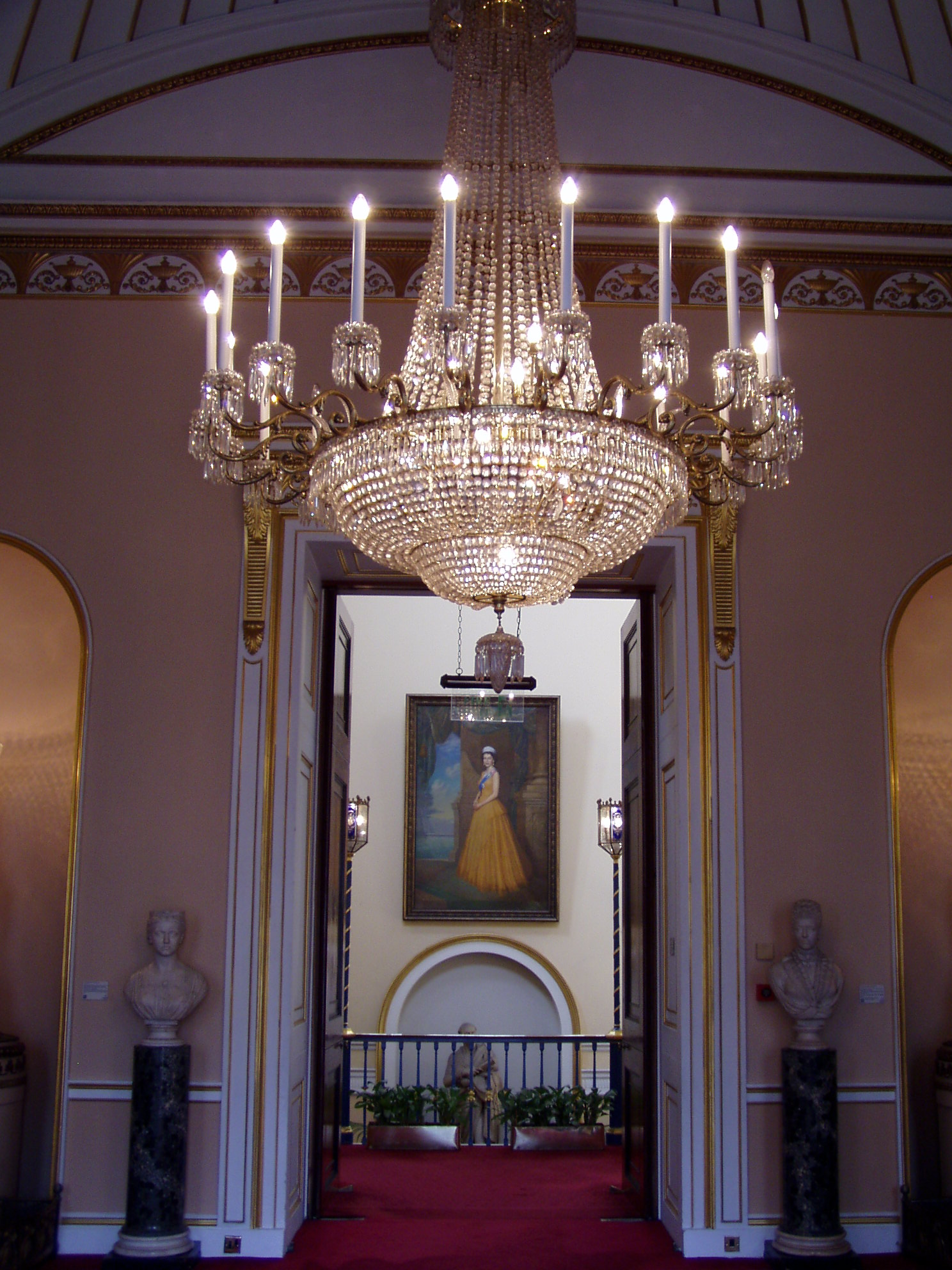
Central Reception Room, Liverpool Town Hall

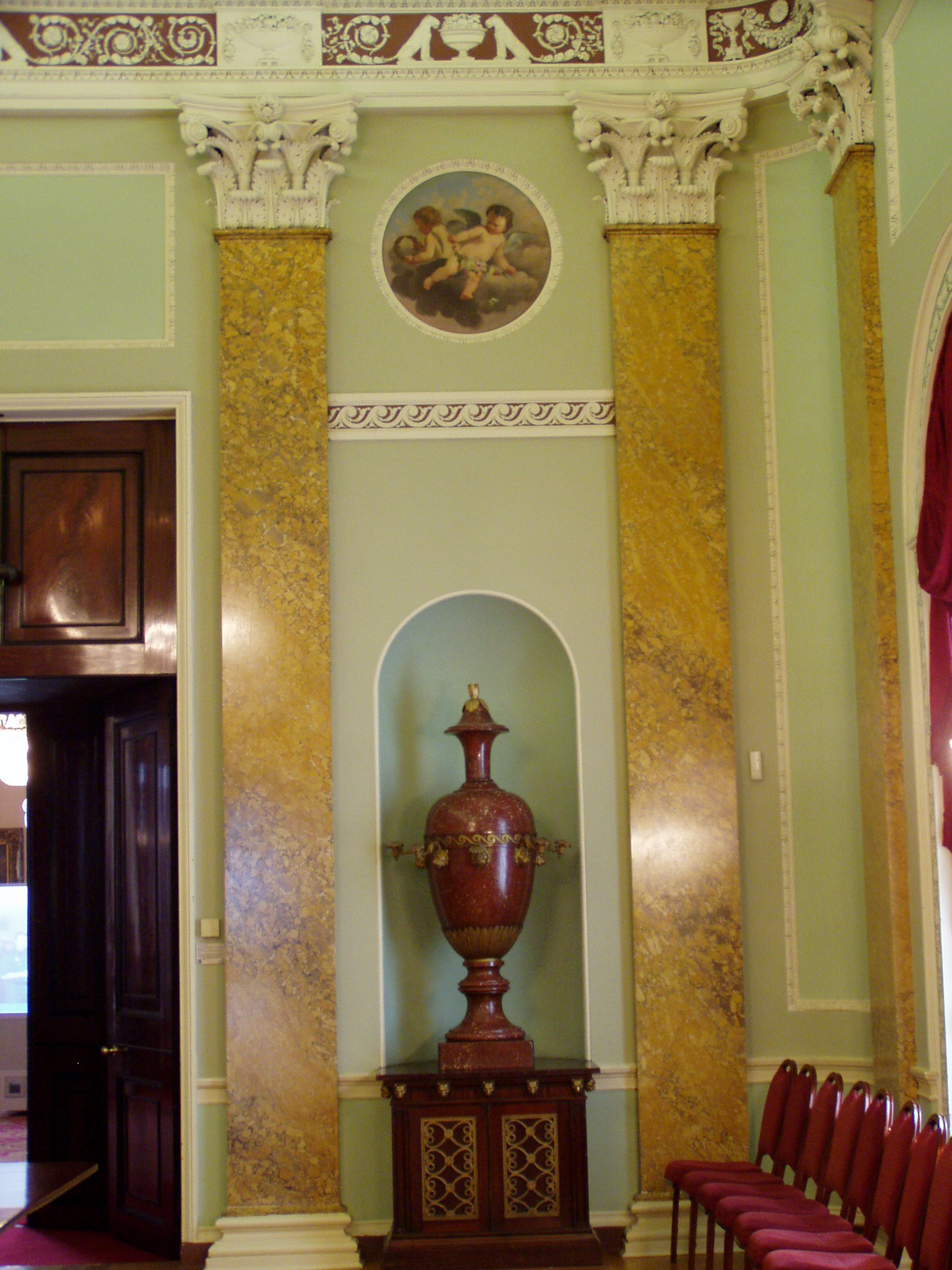
Detail, Dining Room, Liverpool Town Hall

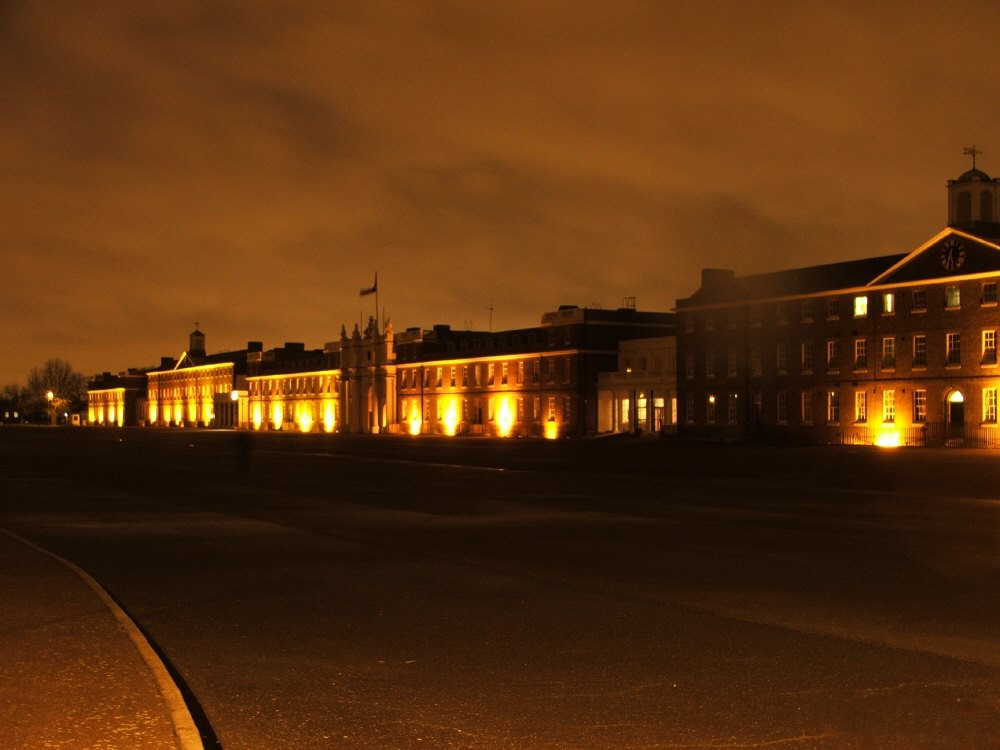
the Royal Artillery Barracks, Woolwich

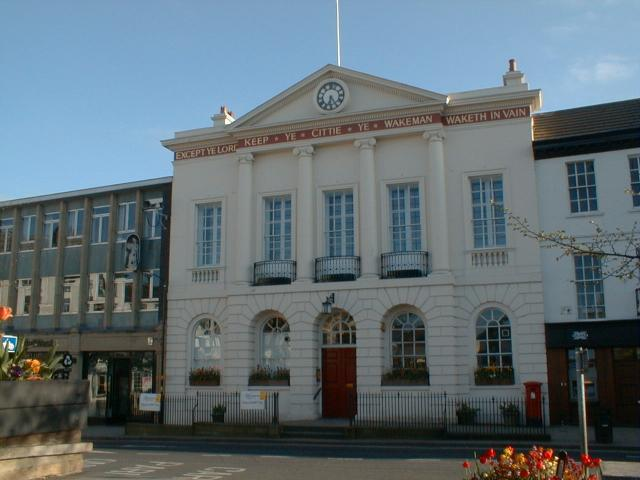
Ripon Town Hall

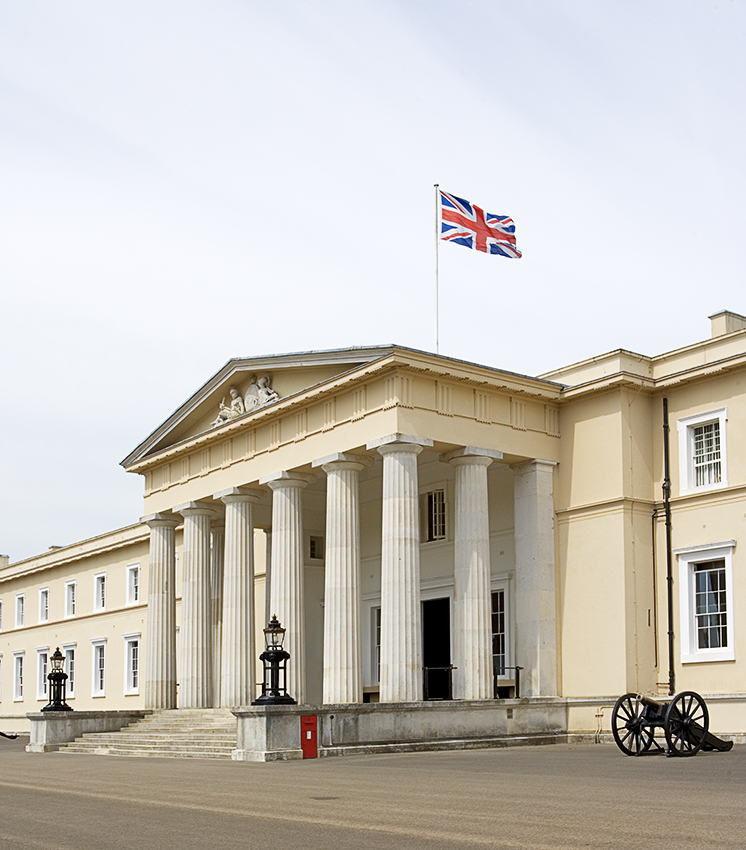
The Royal Military Academy Sandhurst

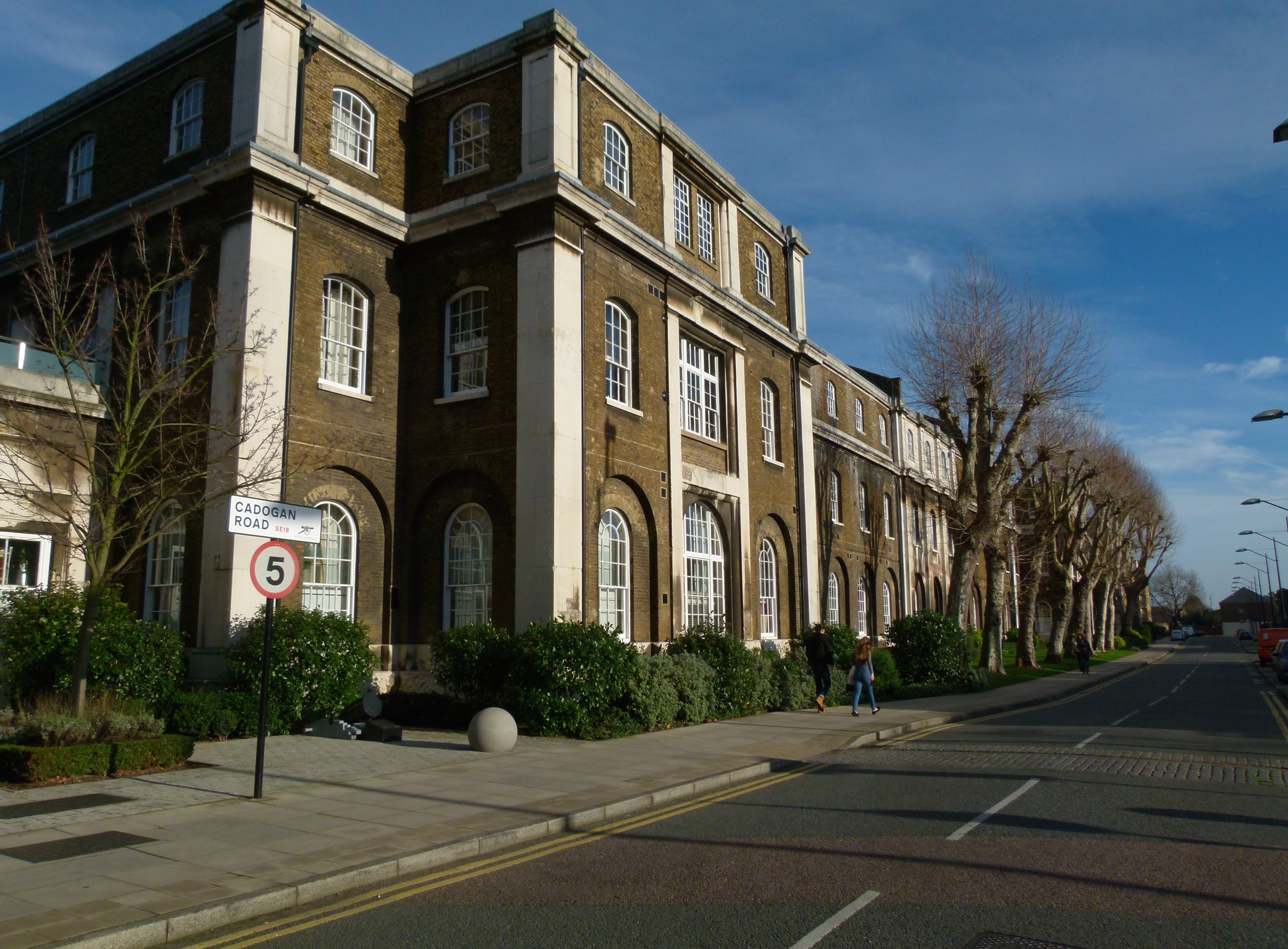
The Grand Store, Royal Arsenal, Woolwich

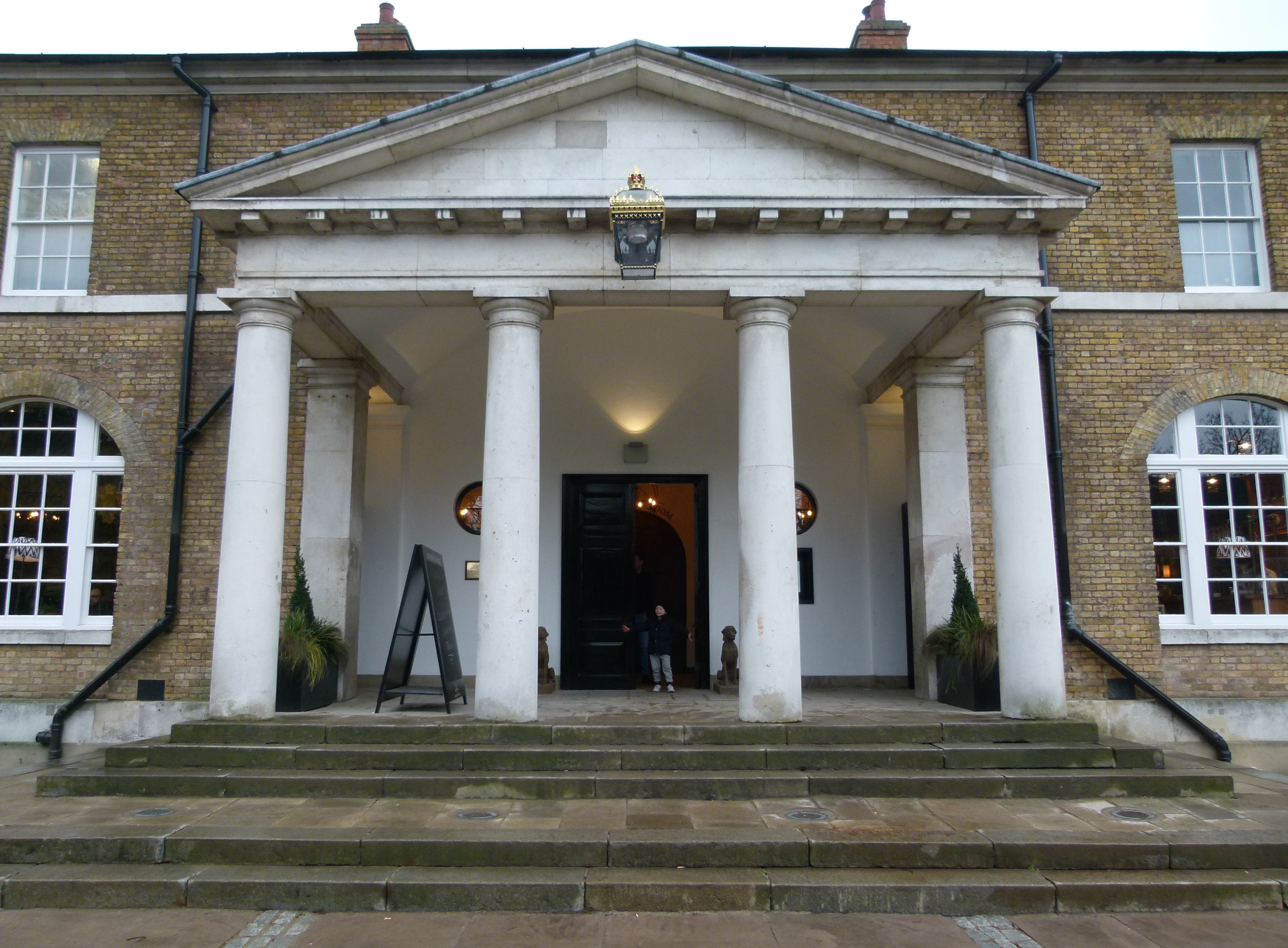
Main Guardhouses, Royal Arsenal, Woolwich

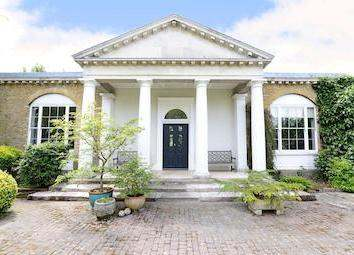
Royal Artillery South West Gatehouse, Woolwich

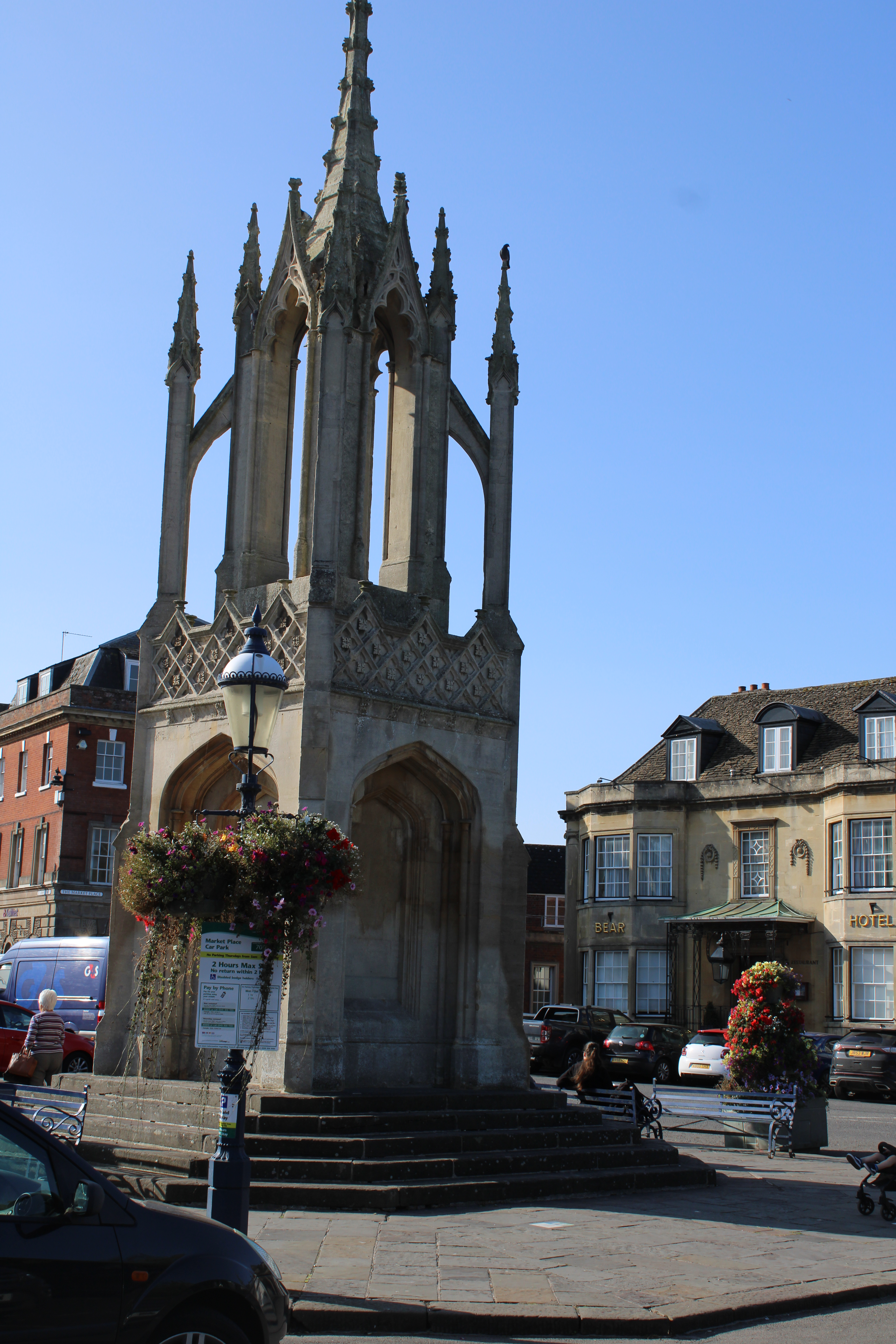
Market Cross, Devizes

=== Churches ===
- St. James Church, in the planned community of Milton Abbas, Dorset, 1774–86
- St. George's Chapel, Windsor Castle, alterations 1787–1790
- Salisbury Cathedral, restoration work 1787–93
- St Peter's Church, Manchester, 1788–94, demolished
- Lichfield Cathedral, restoration 1788–95
- Hereford Cathedral, restoration 1788–97
- Milton Abbey, Dorset, restored Abbey church 1789–91
- East Grinstead Church, Sussex 1789–1813
- Durham Cathedral, restoration 1795-6
- St. Kea Church, Cornwall, 1802 demolished 1895
- Westminster Abbey, London, restoration work 1803
- Hafod Church, Caernarvonshire, 1803, burnt down 1931
- Weeford Church, Staffordshire, 1803
- Henry VII Lady Chapel, Westminster Abbey, restoration 1807–13
- Hanworth Church, Middlesex, 1808–13, rebuilt 1865
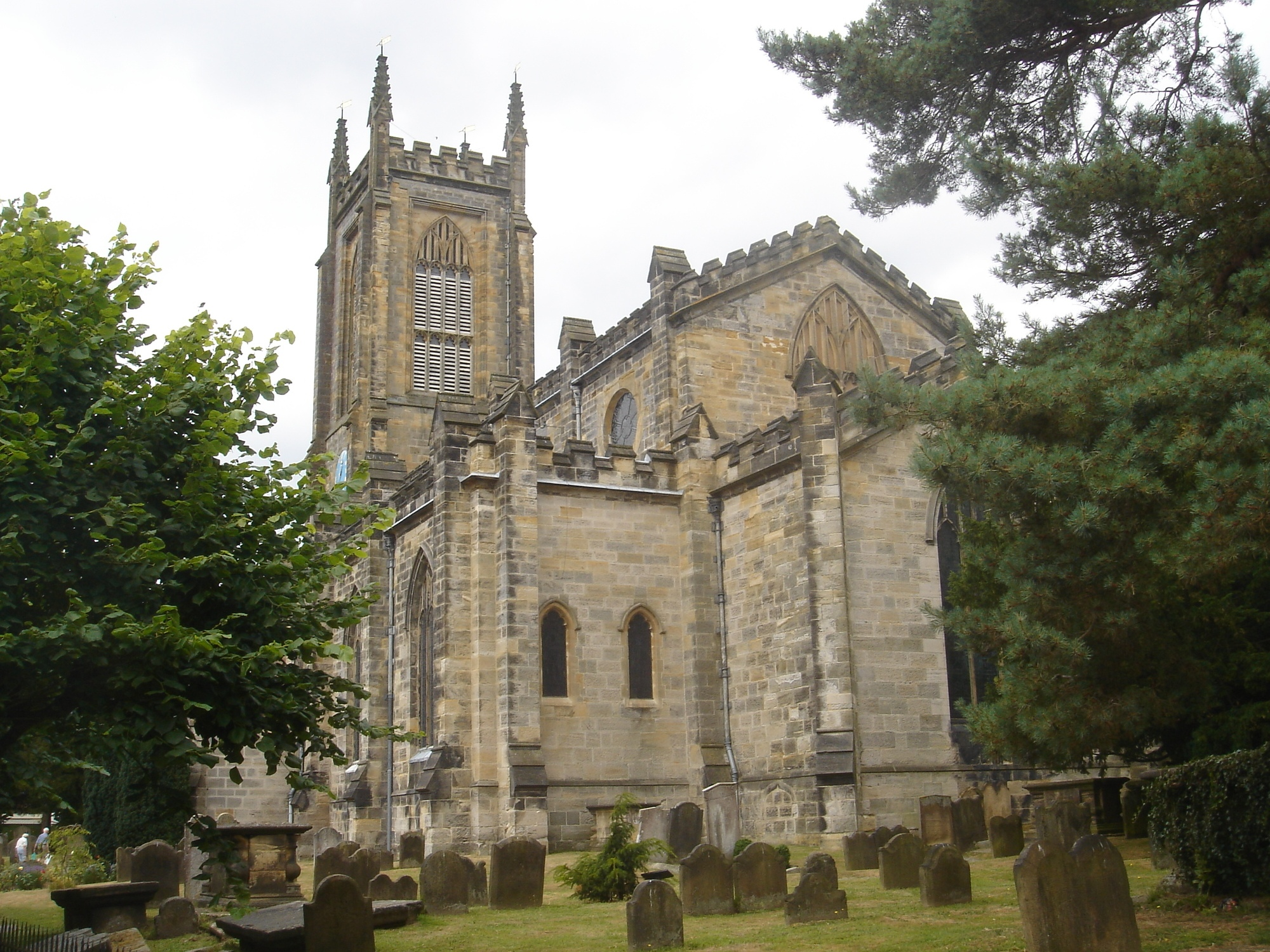
St. Swithun's Church, East Grinstead

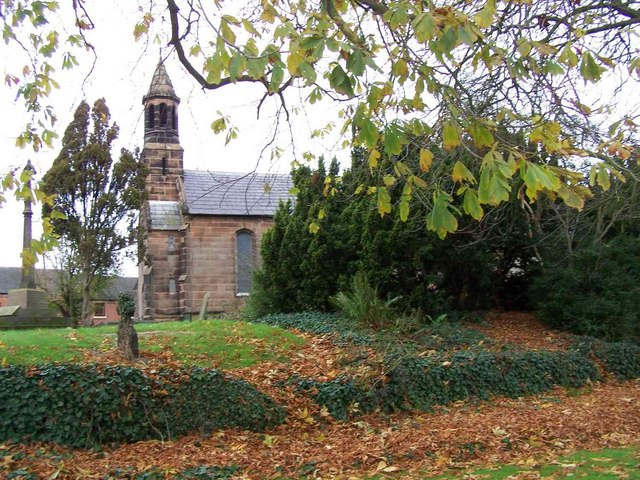
St. Mary's Weeford

=== London houses ===
- 11–15 Portman Square, London, 1774
- House, Grosvenor Square London, 1778-9
- 9 Conduit Street, London, 1779
- Richmond House, London, addition of two rooms and staircase 1782, burnt down 1791
- 1 Foley Place, London, 1783, James Wyatt's own house, demolished 1925
- Lichfield House, 15 St. James Square, London, alterations to the drawing room 1791-4
- Montague House, 22 Portman Square, London, additions 1793, bombed in Blitz 1940
- Queen's House (Buckingham Palace), London, alterations, rebuilt by John Nash 1825–1830
- 22 St. James Square, London, 1803
- Old Palace Kew, London, repairs 1802–11
- New Palace Kew, London, 1802–11, never completed owing to George III's insanity, demolished 1827-8
- Devonshire House, London, the crystal staircase 1811–12, demolished 1924
- Carlton House, London, refitted library 1812, demolished

=== New country houses ===
- Abbeyleix House, County Laois, Ireland 1773
- Gaddesden Place, Hertfordshire, 1768–73
- Heaton Hall, Lancashire, 1772
- Sheffield Park, Sussex, 1776
- Farnham House, Cavan, c. 1777, extended by Francis Johnston, c. 1800
- Grove House, Roehampton, 1777
- Bryanston House, Dorset, 1778 rebuilt by Richard Norman Shaw, 1890
- Hothfield Place, Kent, 1778–80, demolished 1954
- Badger Hall, Shropshire, 1779–1783, demolished 1952
- Roundway House, Wiltshire, 1780, partially demolished 1954
- Fornham Hall, Suffolk, 1781–1782, demolished 1957
- Lee Priory, Kent, 1782–1790, demolished 1954, a room survives in the V&A Museum
- New Park, Roundway, Devizes, Wiltshire, 1783, demolished 1955
- Sudbourne Hall, Suffolk, 1784, later extended and remodelled
- Sunningdale Park, Berkshire, 1785, rebuilt
- Wynnstay House, Denbighshire, 1785–1788, rebuilt in the 19th century
- Stansted Park, Sussex, 1786–1791, rebuilt in 1900
- Sufton Court, Herefordshire, 1788
- Ammerdown House, Kilmersdon, Somerset, 1788
- Gresford House, Denbighshire, c. 1790
- Hartham Park, Wiltshire, 1790–1795
- Castle Coole, County Fermanagh, 1790–1798
- Frogmore House, Berkshire, 1792
- Sundridge Park, Kent, 1792–1795, finished by John Nash
- Henham Hall, Suffolk, 1793–1797, demolished 1953
- Purley Park, Berkshire, 1795
- Bowden House, Bowden Hill, Wiltshire, 1796
- Fonthill Abbey, Wiltshire, 1796–1813
- Trentham Hall, Staffordshire, 1797, remodelled by Sir Charles Barry, demolished c. 1909
- Stoke Poges Park, Buckinghamshire, 1797–1802
- Wycombe Abbey, Buckinghamshire, c.1798
- Dodington Park, Gloucestershire, 1798–1808
- Norris Castle, Isle of Wight, 1799
- Pennsylvania Castle, Dorset, 1800
- Cranbourne Lodge, Windsor Great Park, 1800, demolished 1830
- Nacton House, Suffolk, 1801
- Belvoir Castle, Leicestershire, 1801–1813, work continued under Rev. T. Thornton after Wyatt's death
- West Dean Park, Sussex, 1804, enlarged 1893
- Ashridge, Hertfordshire, 1808–1813, completed by his nephew Sir Jeffry Wyatville after Wyatt's death
- House at Streatham Surrey, 1810
- Elvaston Castle, Derbyshire, 1812
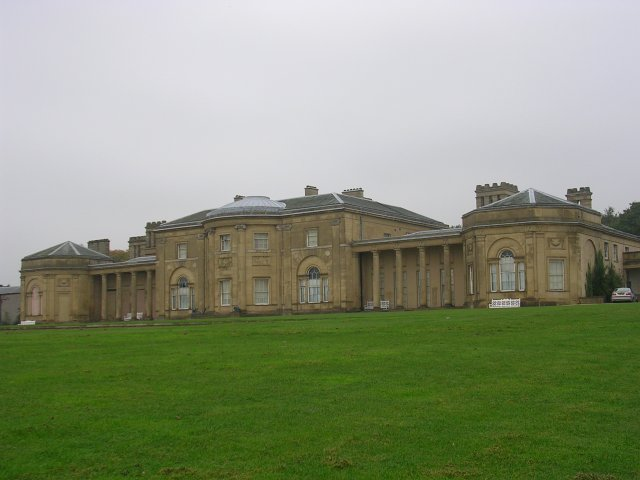
Heaton Hall

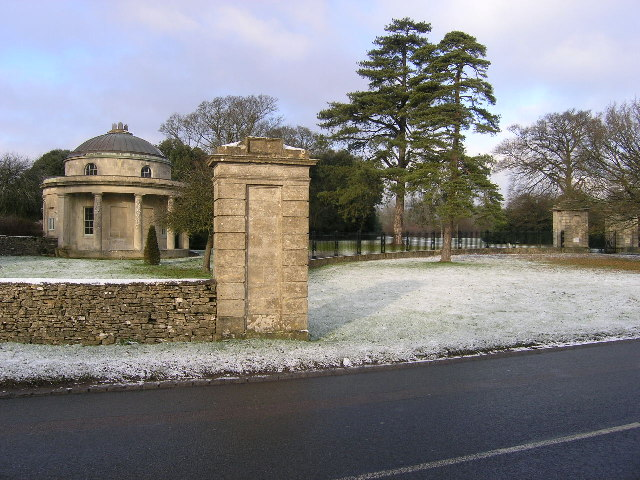
Bath Lodge, Dodington Park

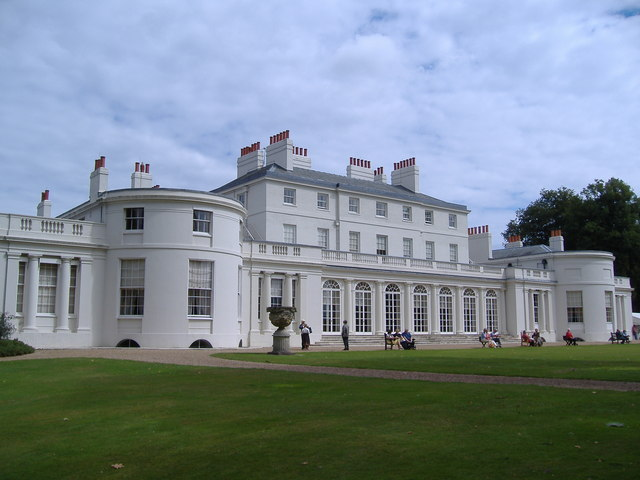
Frogmore House

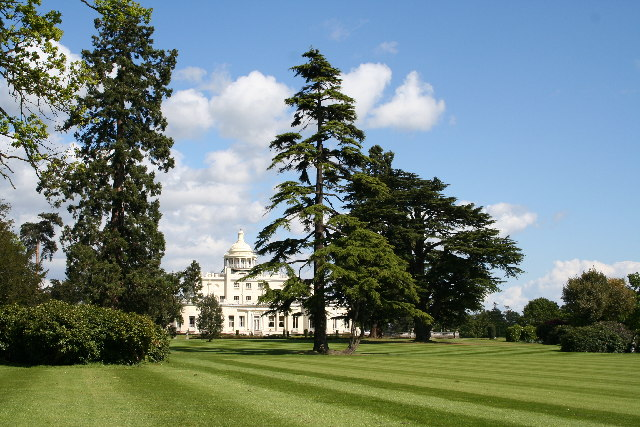
Stoke Poges Park

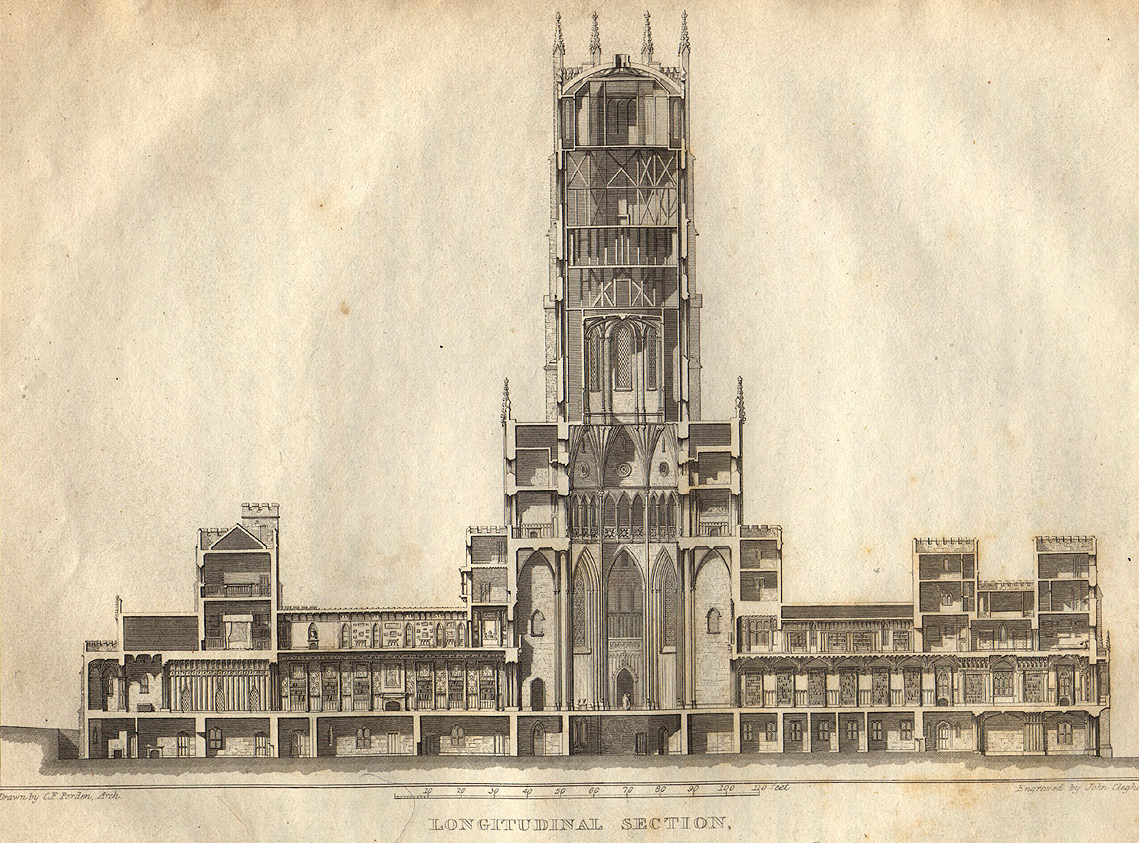
Cross Section, Fonthill Abbey

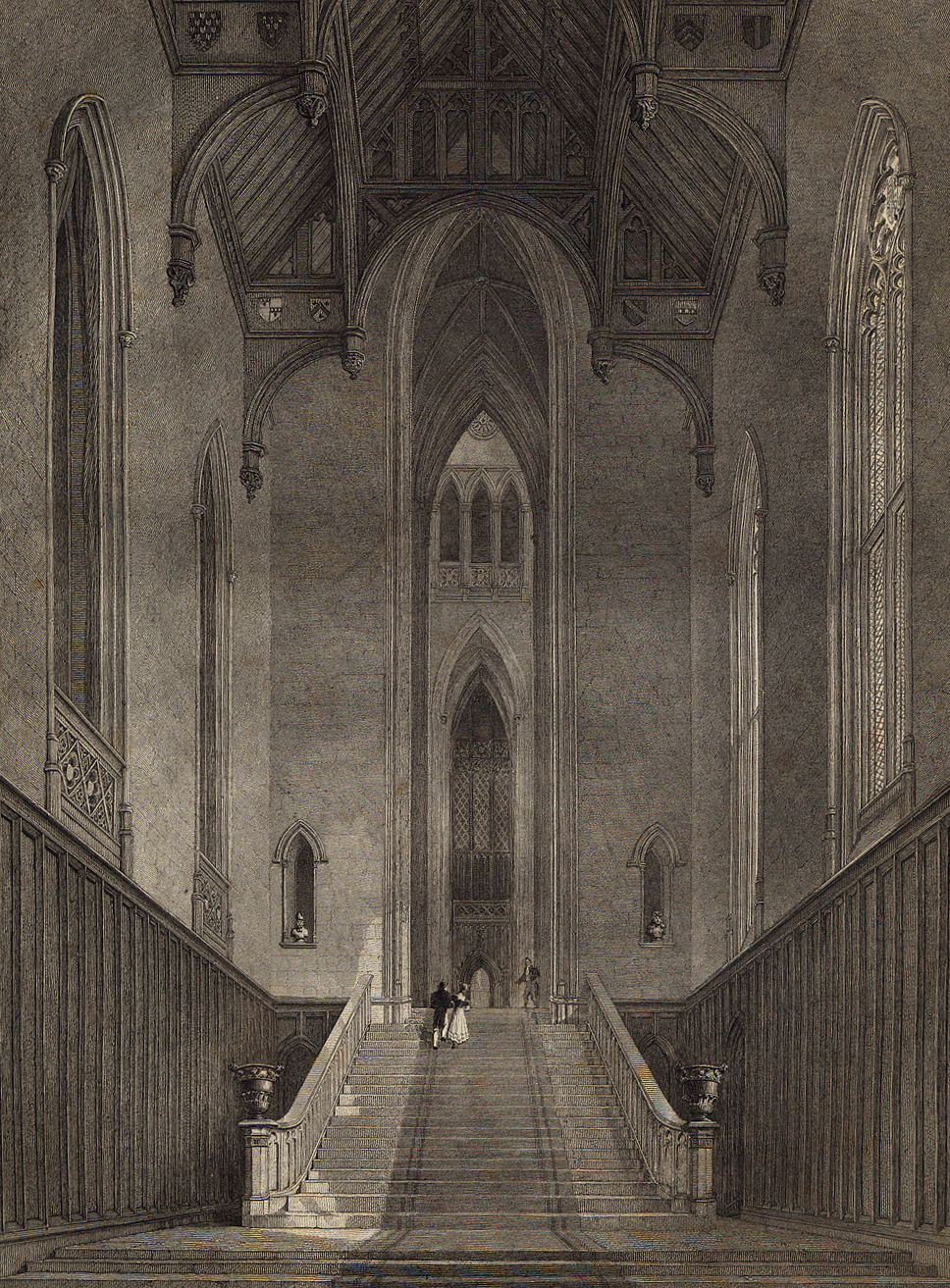
Hall, Fonthill Abbey

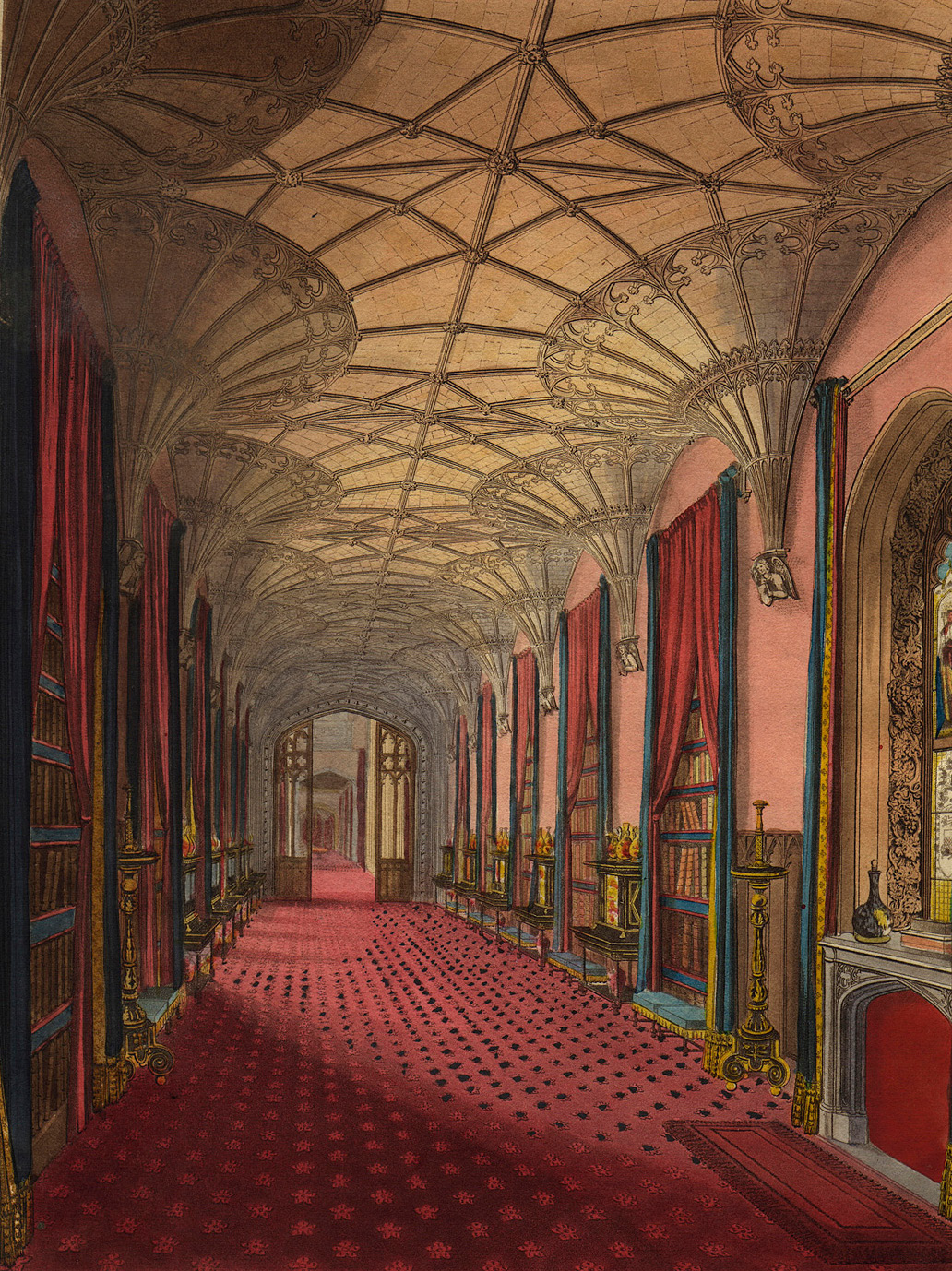
St Michael's gallery, Fonthill Abbey

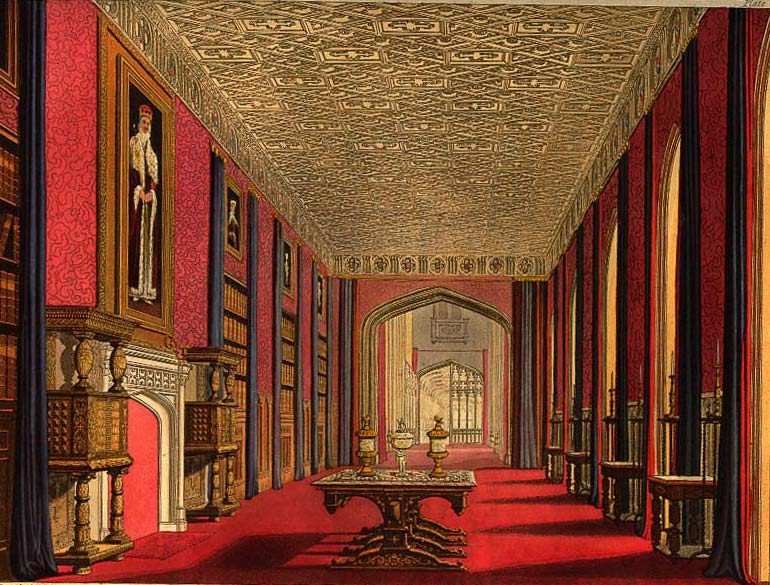
King Edward's gallery, Fonthill Abbey

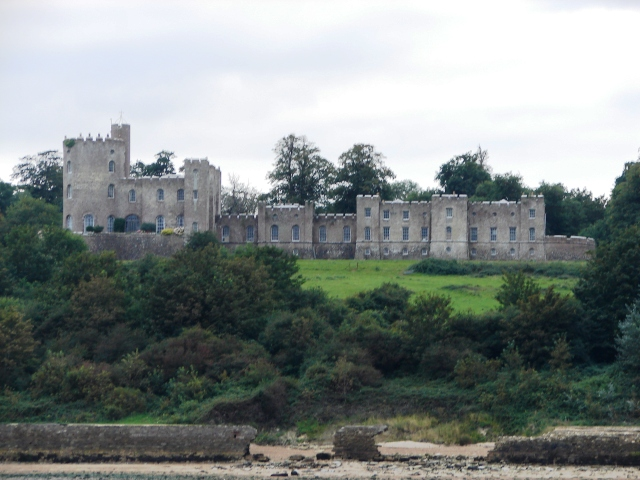
Norris Castle, Isle of Wight

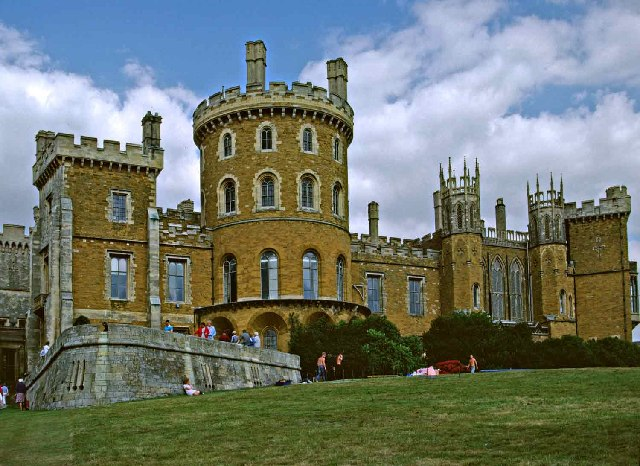
Belvoir Castle, south front

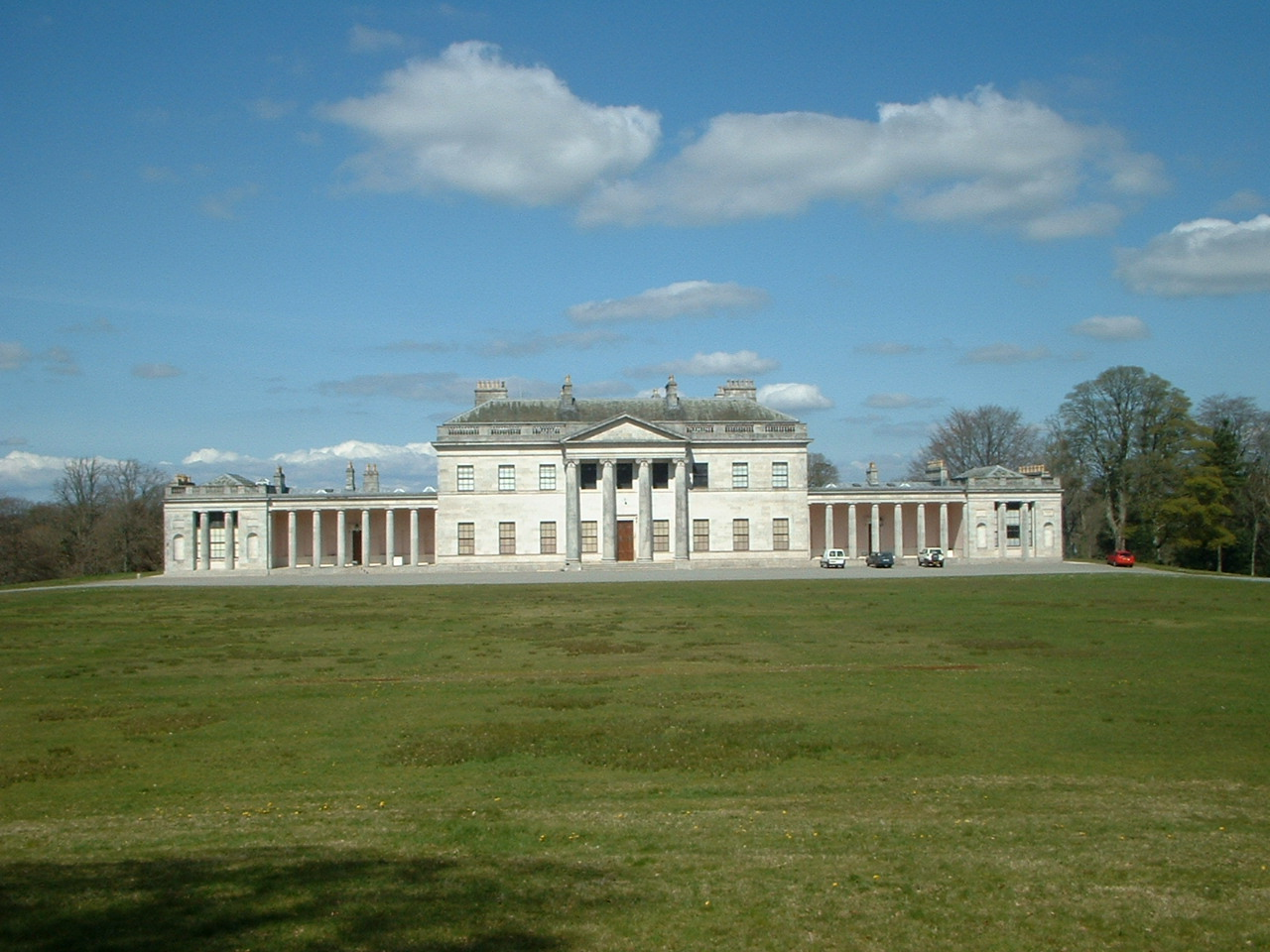
Castle Coole, Enniskillen

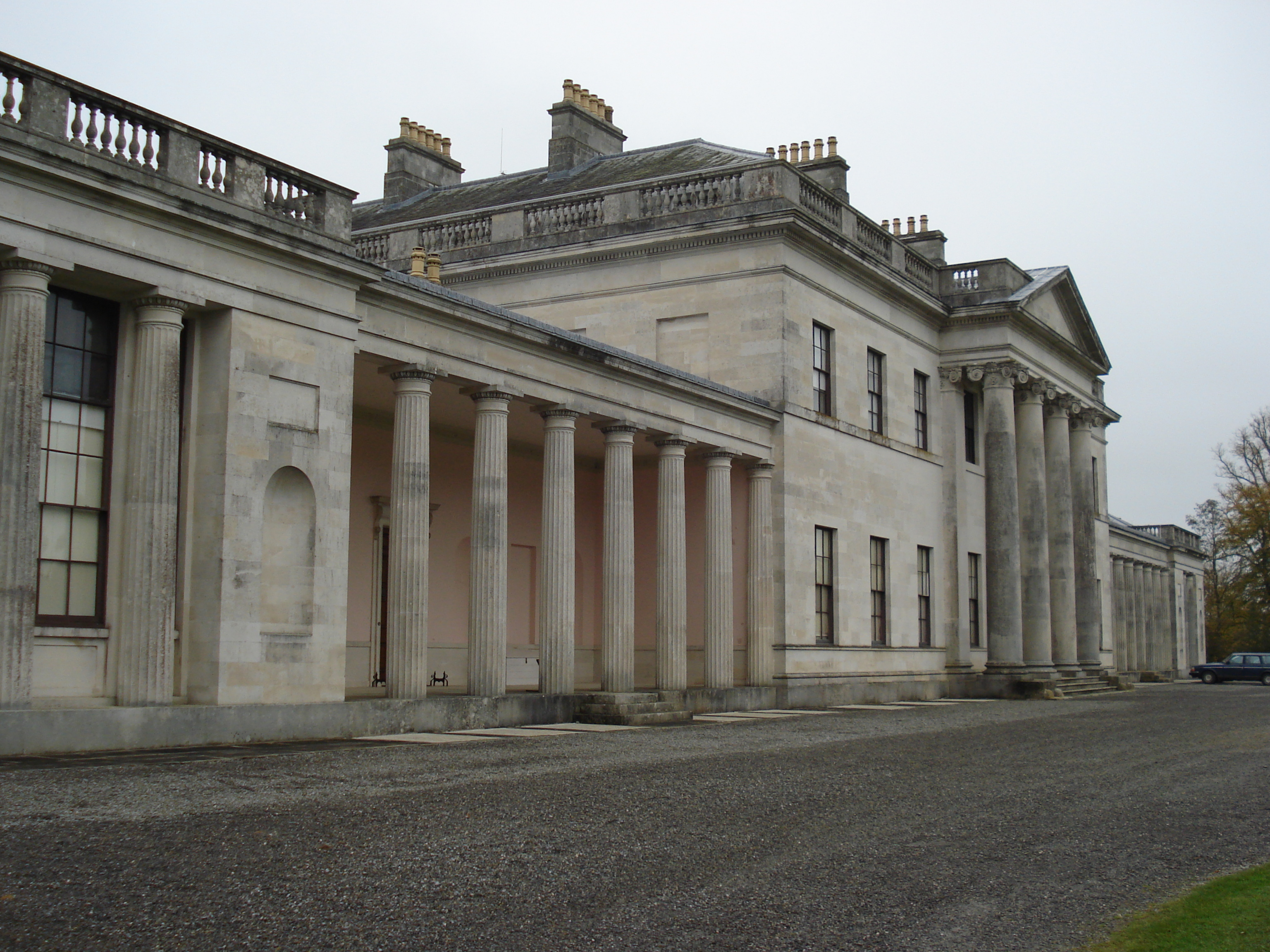
Castle Coole, Enniskillen

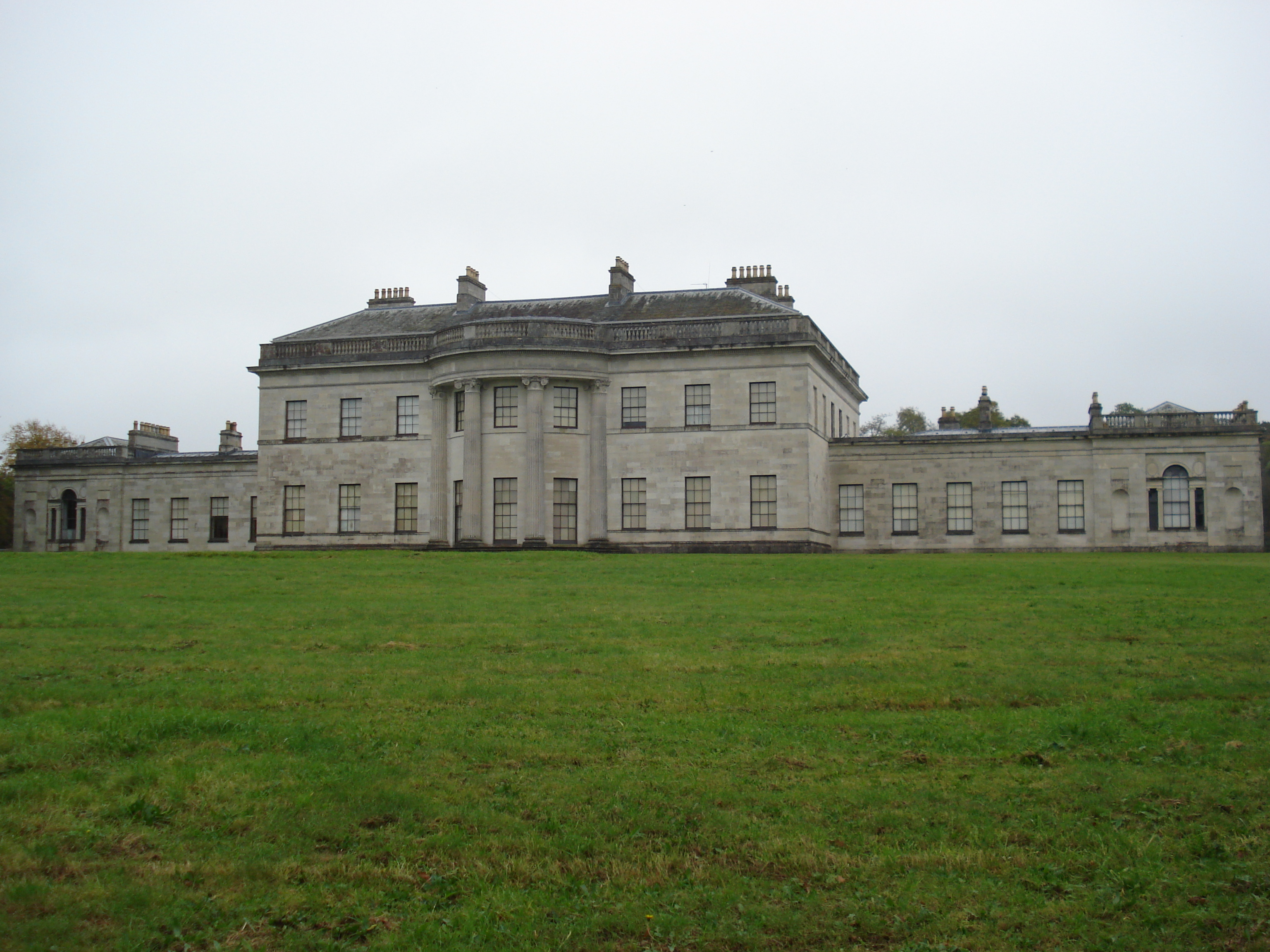
Castle Coole, Enniskillen

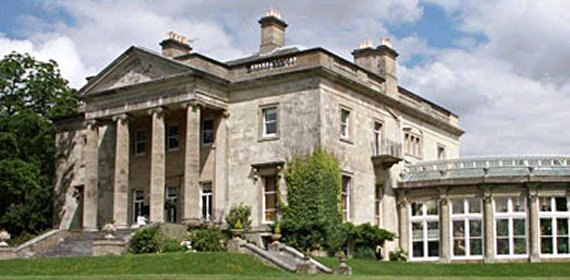
Gaddesden Place

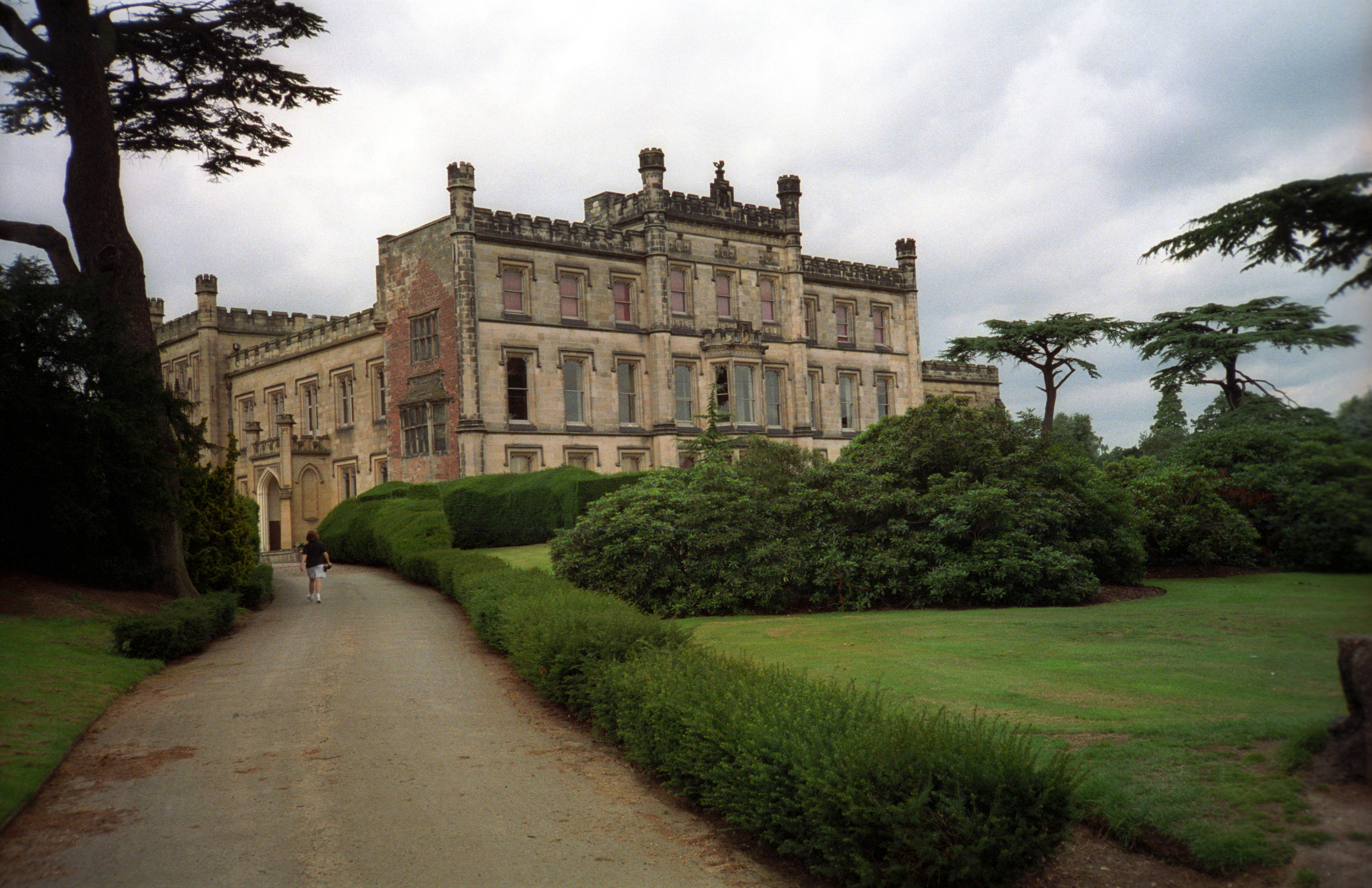
Elvaston Castle

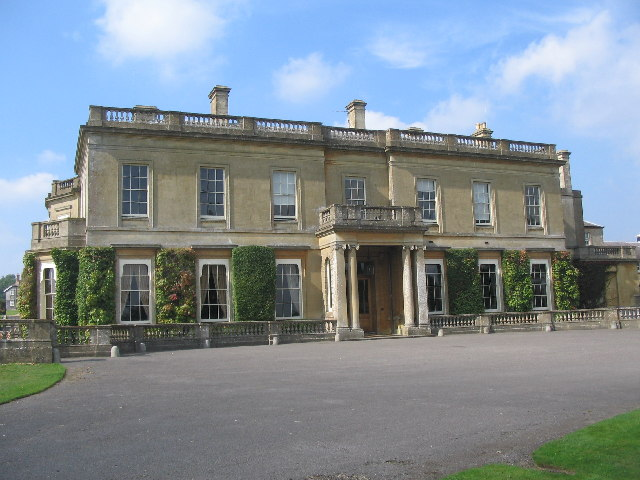
Hartham Park

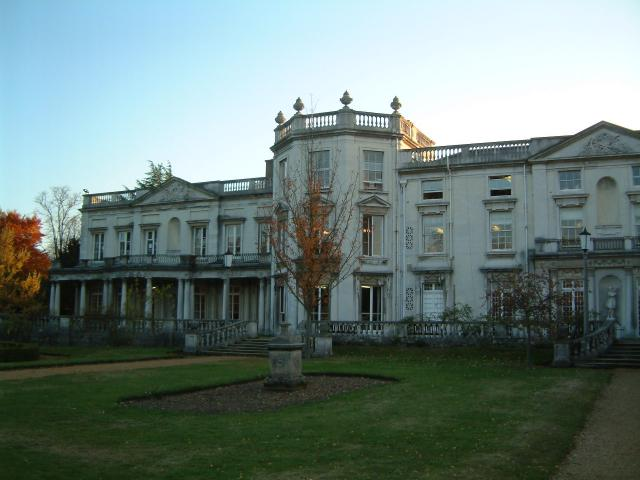
Grove House, Roehampton

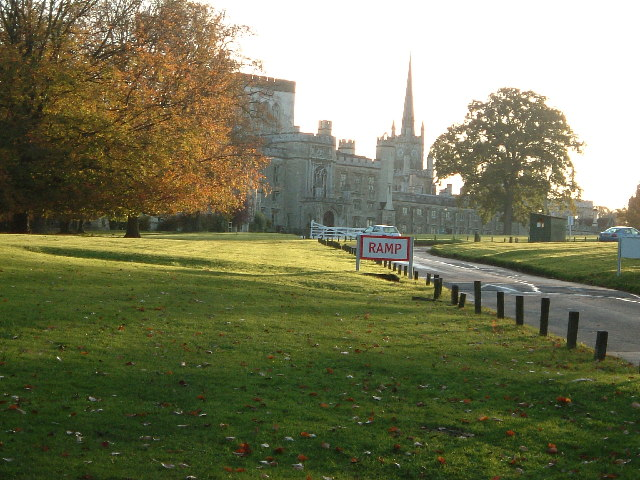
Entrance front, Ashridge

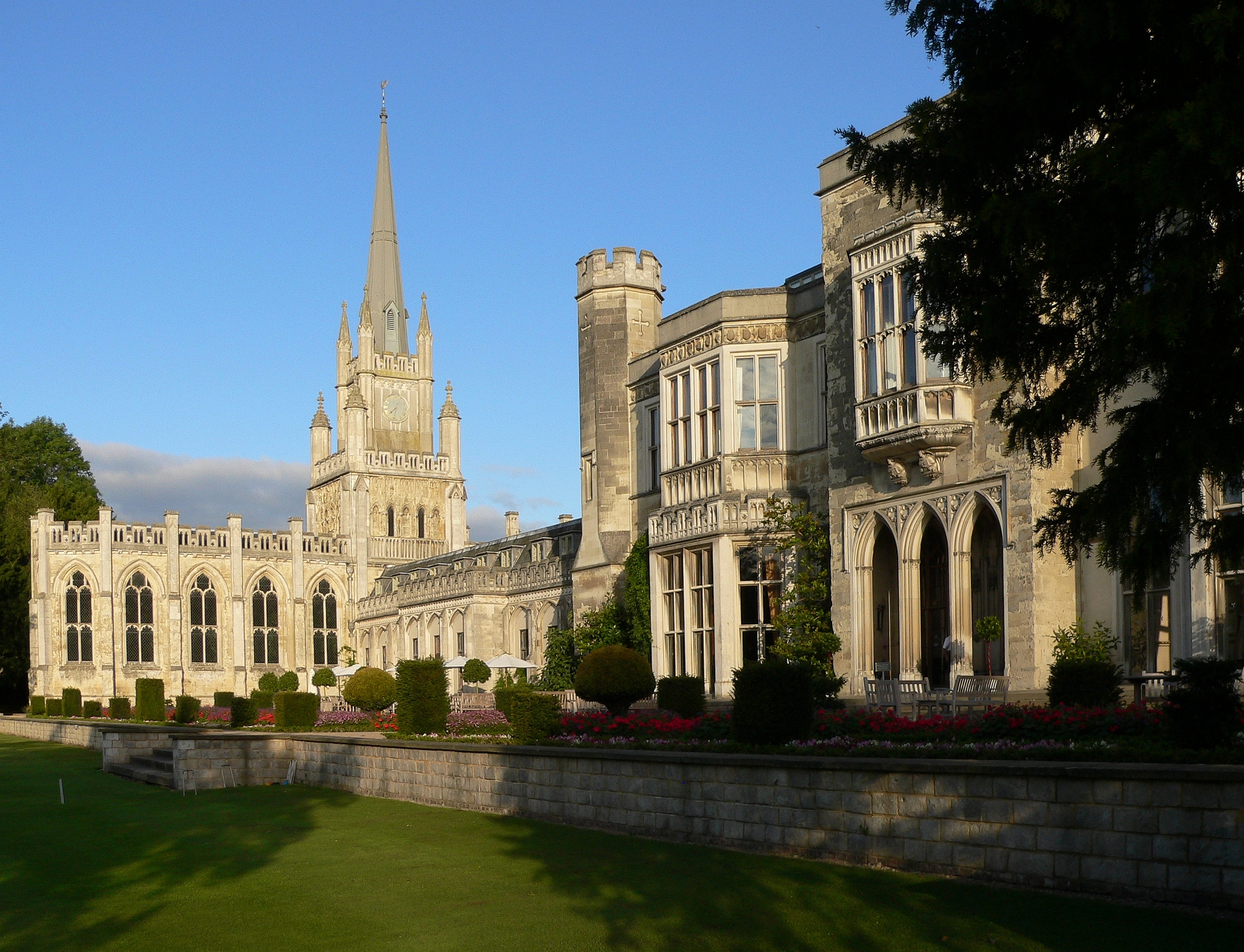
Garden front, Ashridge

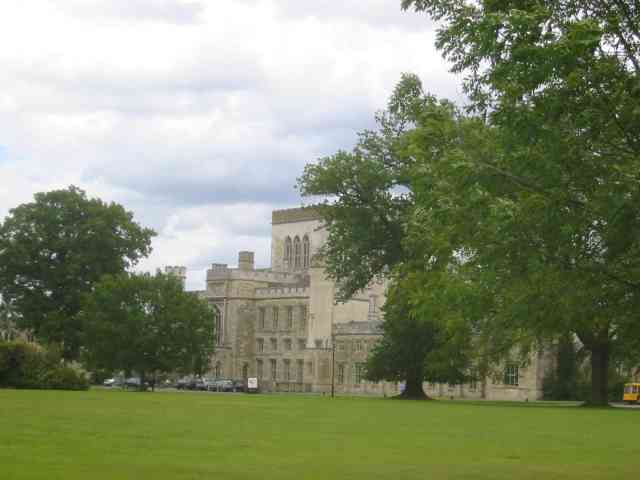
Ashridge House

=== Garden buildings and follies ===
- Folly, Temple Island, 1771
- Bridge, Chiswick House, attributed, 1774
- Cobham Hall, Kent, Darnley Mausoleum, 1783
- Brocklesby Hall, Lincolnshire, the Mausoleum, 1787–94
- Broadway Tower, an isolated folly for Lady Coventry, 1794
- Peper Harrow, Surrey, a conservatory 1797, demolished c. 1913
- Croome Park, Worcestershire, various garden buildings including the Panorama Tower, 1801
- Gothic Ruin, Frogmore, date uncertain
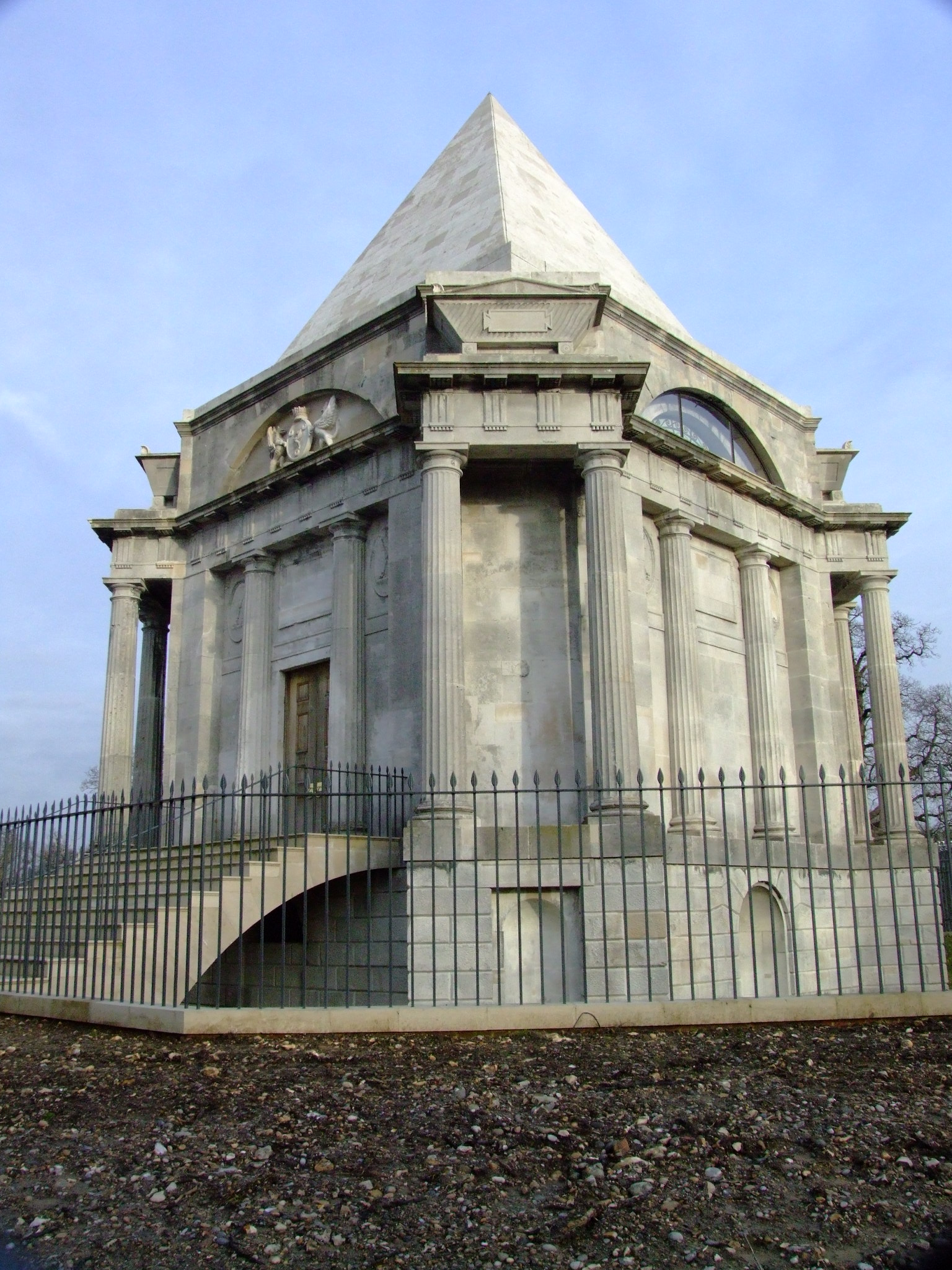
Darnley Mausoleum, Cobham, Kent

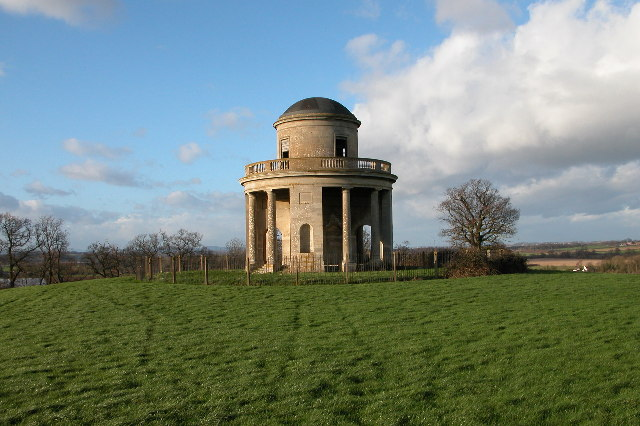
Panorama Tower, Croome Park

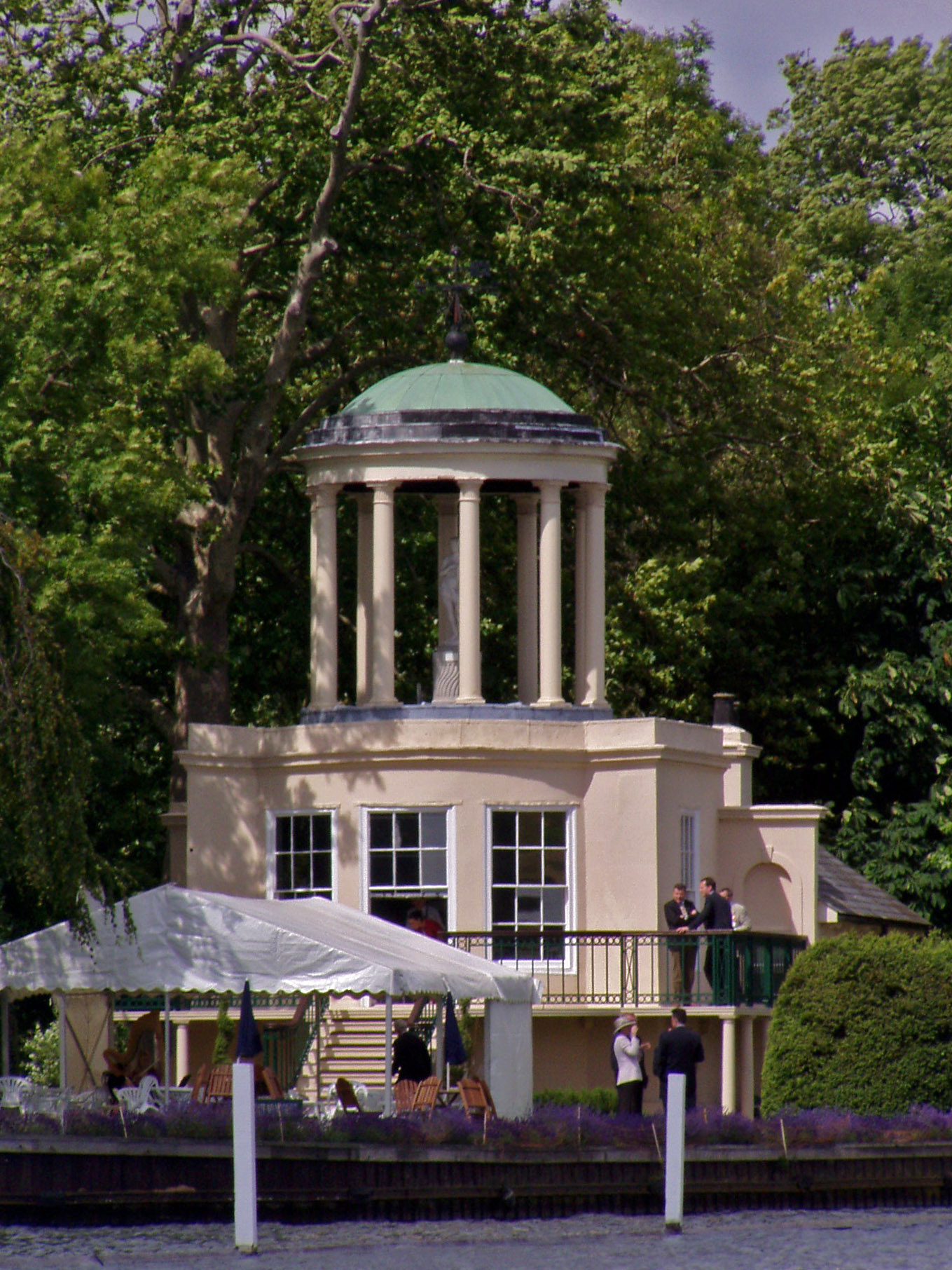
Folly, Temple Island

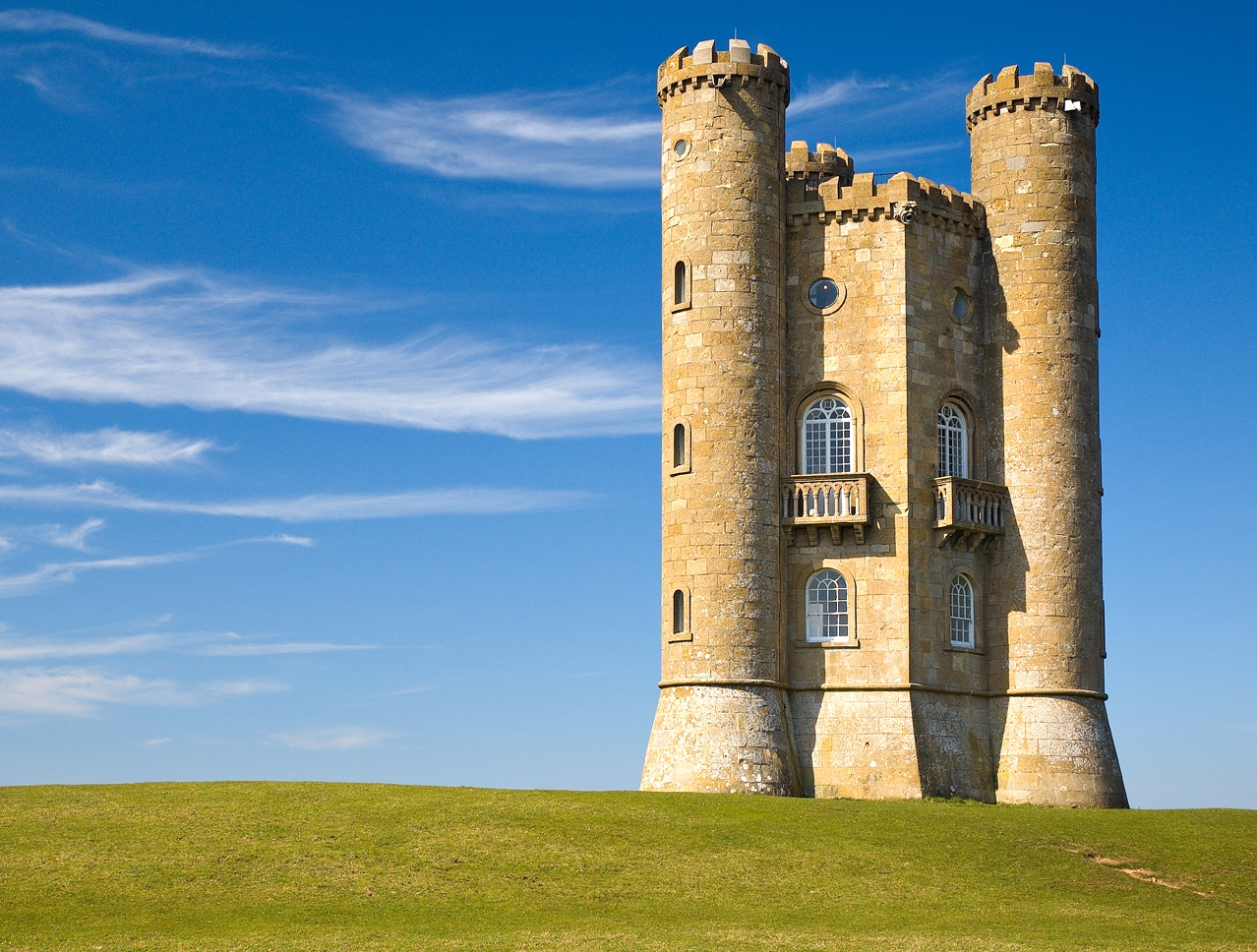
Broadway tower

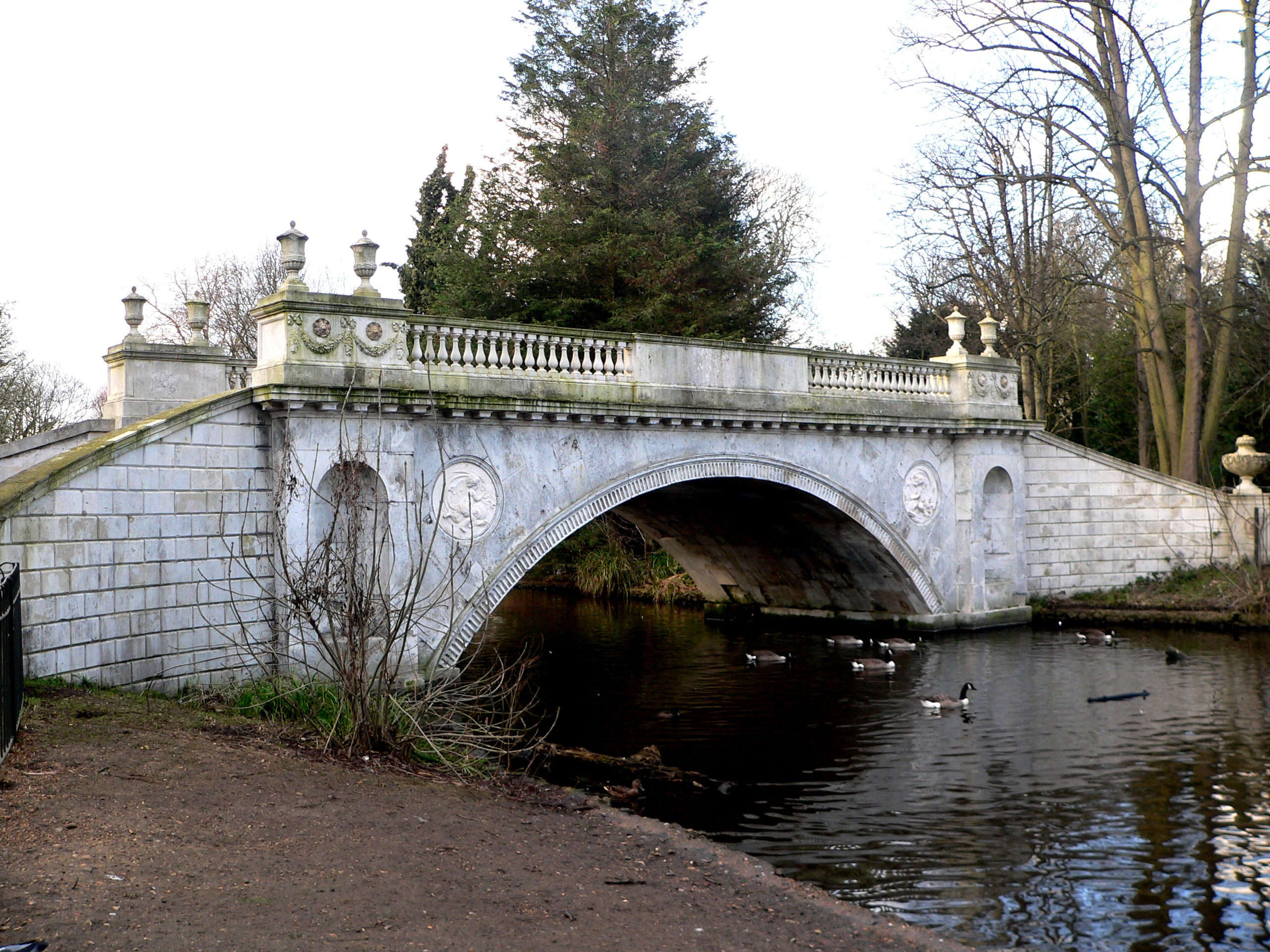
Bridge Chiswick House

=== Alterations to country houses ===
- Fawley Court, Oxfordshire, internal alterations 1771
- Cobham Hall, Kent, alterations and additions, 1771–81, 1789–93, 1801–12
- Crichel House, Dorset, interior alterations 1773
- Charlton Park, Wiltshire, alterations 1774
- Aubrey House, Notting Hill, London, alterations 1774
- Shardeloes, Buckinghamshire, alterations to library, and garden buildings (demolished) 1774
- Copped Hall, Essex redecoration of Library, burnt out in 1917
- Milton Abbey, Dorset, interior decoration 1775-6
- Belton House, Lincolnshire, Library & Boudoir 1776-7
- Burton Constable Hall, Yorkshire, West Drawing Room & Entrance Lodges, 1776-8
- Heveningham Hall, the interiors & orangery, plus the Rectory & Huntingfield Hall (a farm) 1776–84
- Blagdon Hall, Northumberland, internal alterations 1778, Lodges to park 1787 & stables 1789–91
- Ragley Hall, Warwickshire, alterations and interiors 1780
- Sandleford Priory, Berkshire, alterations and additions 1780-6
- Pishobury Park, Hertfordshire, reconstruction of an older house after a fire 1782-4
- Plas Newydd, Anglesey, alterations & enlargements 1783–95 and 1811
- Gunton Hall, Norfolk, enlargement 1785, partially demolished
- Leinster House, Dublin, decoration of the gallery 1785
- Cremore House, Chelsea, alterations 1785–1788, demolished
- Goodwood House, Sussex, enlargements, kennels & dower house, 1787–1806
- Powderham Castle, addition of music room 1788
- Soho House, Birmingham, alterations, additions and interiors 1790s
- Curraghmore House, County Waterford, Ireland, interior design 1790s
- Felbrigg Hall, Norfolk, alterations 1791–1804
- Auckland Castle, County Durham, Gothic screen, inner gateway, processional route, Chapel, and Throne Room c.1795
- Corsham Court, Wiltshire, alterations 1796
- Cricket St Thomas, Somerset, alterations 1796–1800
- Windsor Castle, Berkshire, alterations and interiors 1796–1800
- Canwell Hall, Staffordshire, added wings and interiors, 1798, demolished 1911
- Swinton Park, Yorkshire, North Wing 1798
- Cassiobury House, Hertfordshire, alterations & additions 1799
- Wilton House, Wiltshire, alterations 1801–11
- Bulstrode Park, Buckinghamshire, 1807, rebuilt by Benjamin Ferrey 1862
- Swinton Park, Yorkshire, south wing 1813
- Chicksands Priory, Bedfordshire, alterations 1813–14
- Ardbraccan House, County Meath, Ireland, preliminary design of central block 1773
- Draycot House Draycot Cerne, Wiltshire, design for a ceiling and bracket for a bust by Joseph Wilton 1784
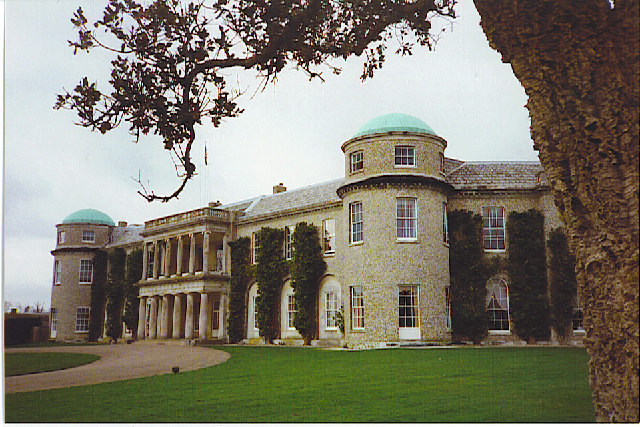
Goodwood House

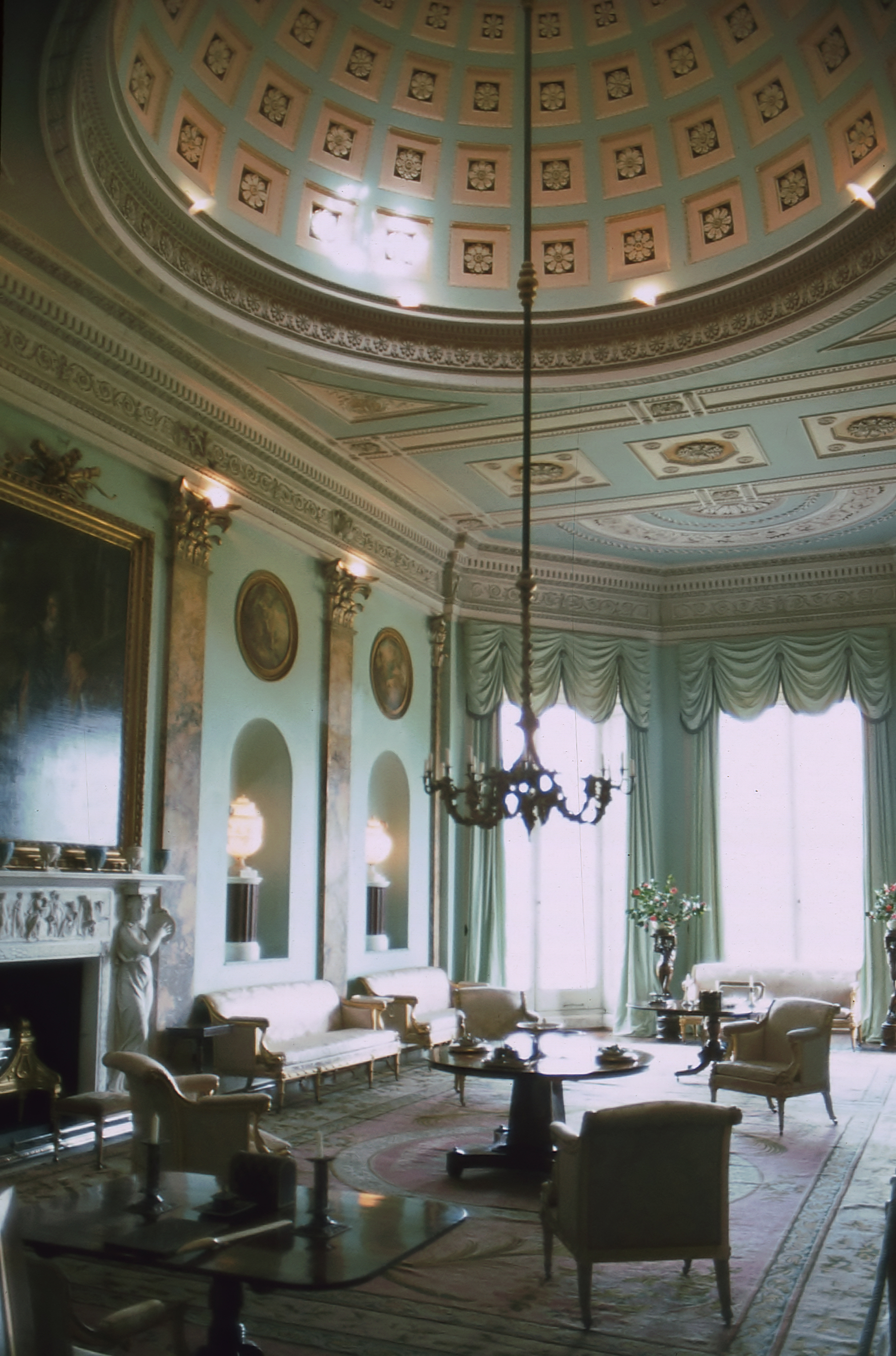
Powderham Castle, Music Room

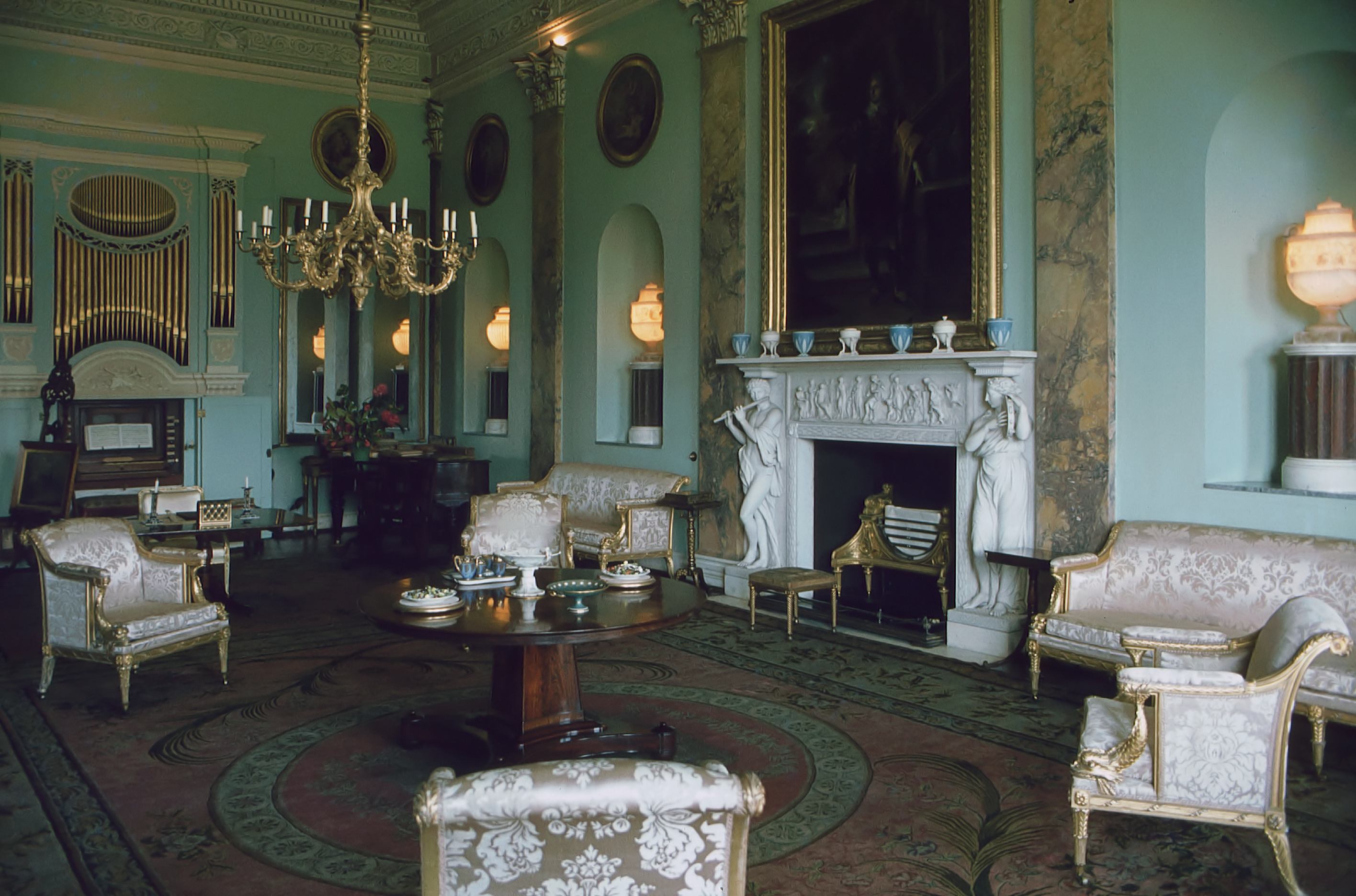
Powderham Castle, Music Room

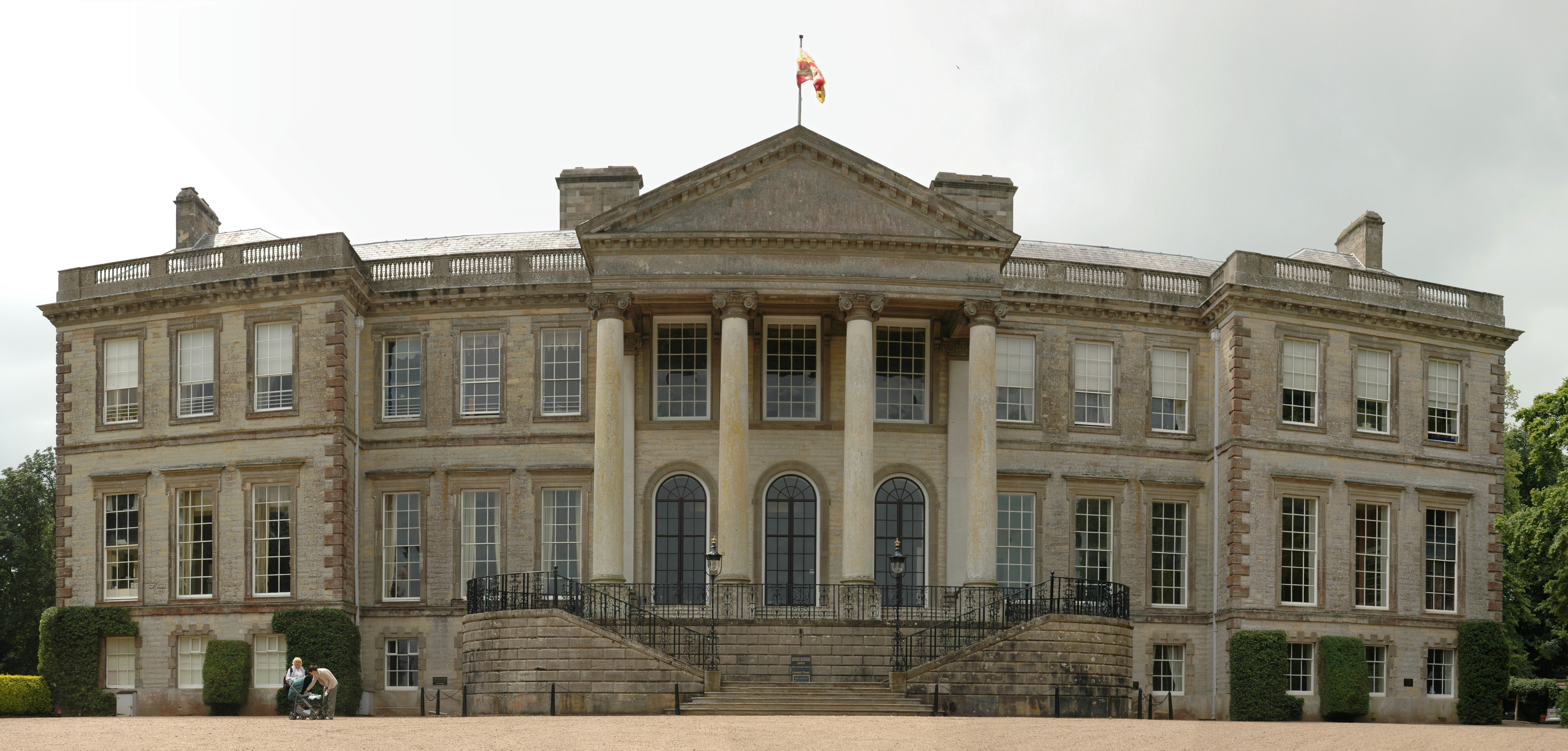
Ragley Hall, with portico added 1780 by Wyatt

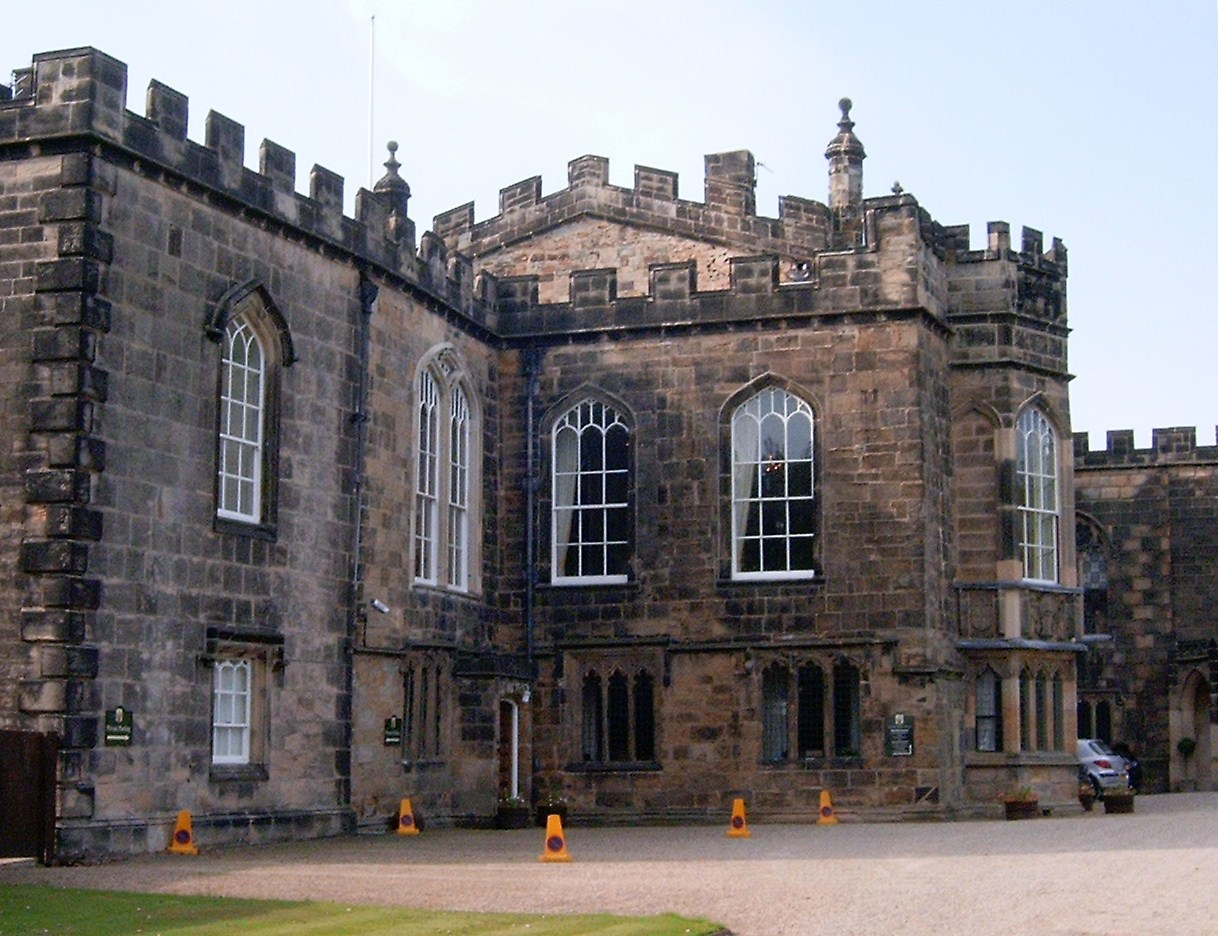
Auckland Castle, County Durham

=== Drawings ===
Few original drawings by Wyatt are known to be in existence: but in the RIBA library there are designs by him for Badger Hall, Fonthill Abbey, Downing College, Cambridge, and Ashridge Park. The Royal Academy has drawings for the mausoleums at Brocklesby Park and Cobham Hall. An album of Wyatt's sketches, in the possession of the Vicomte de Noailles, contains designs for chandeliers, torchères, vases, a plan for Lord Courtown, and more . Those for Slane Castle are in the Murray Collection of the National Library of Ireland.

== Portrayals ==
There is a portrait in the RIBA library, and a pencil portrait by George Dance is in the Library of the Royal Academy. The National Portrait Gallery has a bronze bust of Wyatt by John Charles Felix Rossi.

== See also ==
- Wyatt family

== Footnotes ==
Court offices
Preceded by William Chambers	Surveyor-General and Comptroller; 1796–1813	Succeeded by (post discontinued)

Cultural offices
Preceded by Benjamin West	President of the Royal Academy; 1805–1806	Succeeded by Benjamin West
