= Archaeology of Windsor Castle =

The archaeology of Windsor Castle comprises the archaeological investigations at Windsor Castle, Berkshire.

== Traditional historiography ==
Almost no archaeological work was done at Windsor Castle until the 20th century. As a result, most studies of the castle depended upon architectural analysis and historical research. The most prominent book on the castle, Sir William St John Hope's 1913 volumes, had almost no archaeological evidence to draw on when analysing the castle's history.

== Modern investigations ==
=== 1895 investigation ===
An archaeological investigation into the site of the Great Hall in the Lower Ward of the castle occurred in 1895.

=== 1970s investigation ===
An archaeological investigation into St George's Chapel at the castle took place in the late 1970s.

=== 1988-92 investigation ===
In the late 1980s it was discovered that the motte beneath the Round Tower was in danger of collapse. In advance of strengthening works, a major archaeological investigation into the design and structure of the building and mound took place between 1988-92.

=== 2006, Big Royal Dig ===
Windsor Castle was one of three royal sites excavated over four days on behalf of Channel 4's archaeological television programme Time Team from 25 to 28 August 2006. It was undertaken by Oxford Archaeology. In the United Kingdom, Channel 4 devoted an evening television program to each day's findings, presented by Tony Robinson, and also followed the dig live on More4, together with a simulcast on the internet.

Timed to help celebrate the 80th birthday of Queen Elizabeth II, along with many other events ongoing throughout 2006, this marked the 150th dig conducted by Time Team. For the first time, the Queen gave permission for trenches to be dug in the Garden of Buckingham Palace, as well as in Windsor Castle and the Palace of Holyroodhouse, Edinburgh. The Big Royal Dig is an example of the Queen opening up her homes for greater access to the public, as she did during her Golden Jubilee Weekend in 2002 and throughout 2006 for her birthday.

The archaeologists had an unprecedented opportunity to probe the geophysics and history of three royal residences over a four-day period, with teams working concurrently in the three locations.

Windsor Castle was the scene of two remarkable finds:

- In the Upper Ward, the foundations of the Round Table building erected in 1344 by Edward III were discovered, and also, among other finds, a spectacular decorated mediaeval tile in situ. In Edward's day the Round Table building, 200 feet (60 m) in diameter, was used for feasting, festivals, and theatrical re-enactments of the Knights of the Round Table of Arthurian legend.
- In the Lower Ward, the Great Hall of Henry III's palace was located and one of its walls, still standing, was found. This has assisted archaeologists in assessing where Windsor's first palace actually stood.

These finds have added to knowledge of the location, history, and uses of the Round Table and the Great Hall.

== Bibliography ==
- Brindle, Steven and Brian Kerr. (1997) Windsor Revealed: New light on the history of the castle. London: English Heritage. ISBN 1-85074-688-5.
