= Gothic Ruin, Frogmore =

Listed folly in Berkshire, England

Gothic Ruin
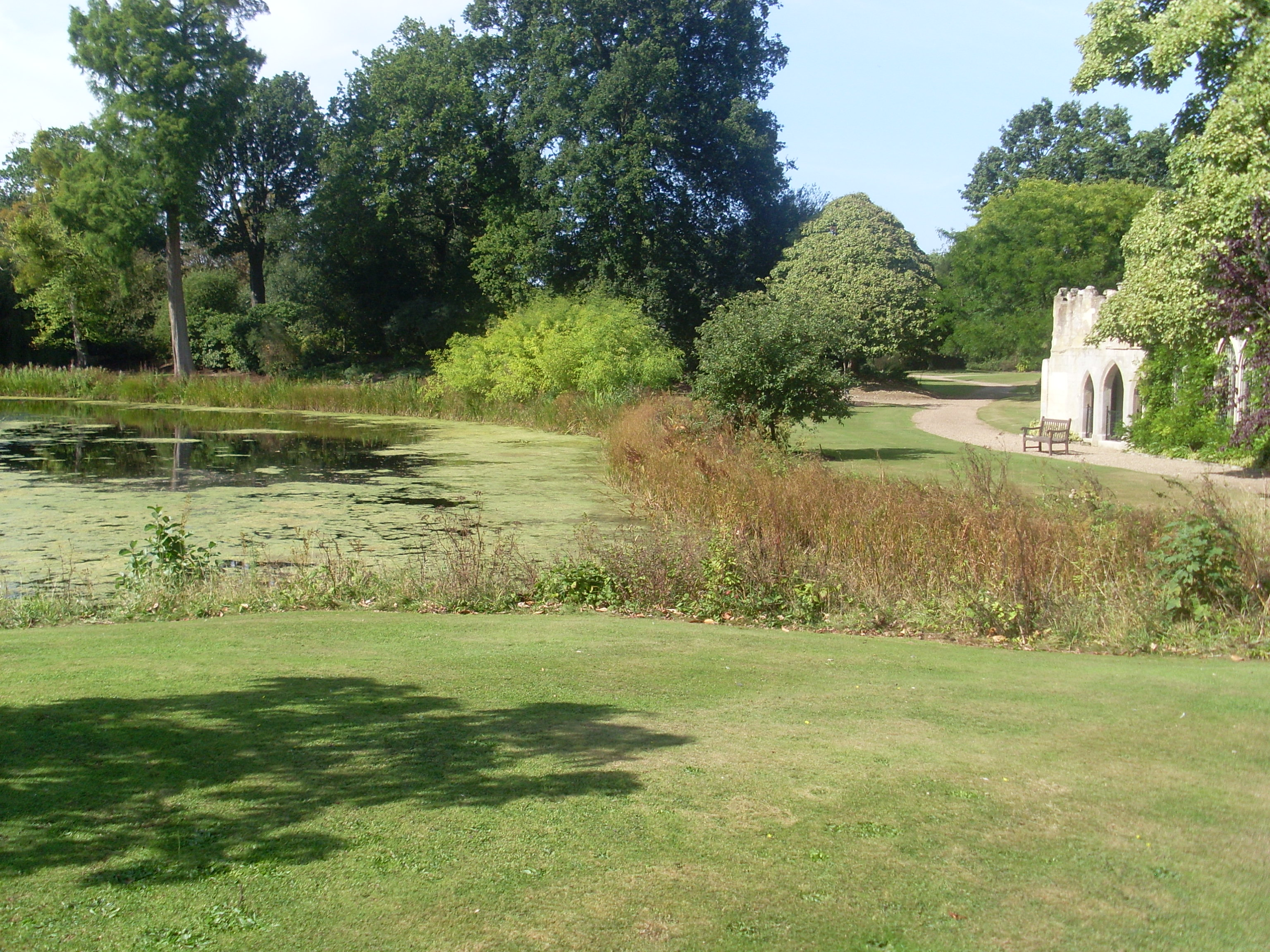

- Location within Berkshire

General information
- Type: Folly
- Architectural style: Gothic Revival
- Location: Frogmore, Home Park, Windsor, Berkshire, England
- Coordinates: 51.4752°N 0.5963°W
- Construction started: c. 1790s
- Governing body: Crown Estate

Listed Building – Grade II*
- Official name: Gothic ruin of temple by lake in Frogmore Gardens
- Designated: 2 October 1975
- Reference no.: 1319305

Design and construction
- Architect: James Wyatt

The Gothic Ruin is located at Frogmore, in the Home Park of Windsor Castle, in Berkshire, England. Designed by James Wyatt in the late 18th century, the structure is a folly, comprising a summer house enveloped in the trappings of a Gothic ruin. It is a Grade II* listed building.

== History ==
Frogmore House and its estate were bought by George III for his wife Queen Charlotte in 1792, although the land had formed part of the Windsor royal hunting ground since the reign of Henry VIII. Charlotte engaged James Wyatt to redesign the house and sought the advice of her Vice-Chamberlain, William Price, regarding the redevelopment of the grounds. (Note: Charlotte’s ambition was to create a Paradis Terrestre, a secluded enclave enabling an escape from the rituals of court and modelled on the, almost contemporary, Hameau de la Reine at Versailles.) Price's brother Uvedale, an early exponent of the Picturesque, clearly influenced the design.

The Gothic Ruin was designed by James Wyatt, reportedly in collaboration with Princess Elizabeth, the seventh child of George and Queen Charlotte. Elizabeth was a talented amateur artist. A pencil sketch of the ruins of 1831 by William Alfred Delamotte, formerly in a collection of drawings of the Frogmore Estate put together by Elizabeth, was returned to the Royal Collection in 1984.

In 1840 Frogmore was inherited by the Duchess of Kent and, following her death in 1861, by her daughter, Queen Victoria. The estate became a favoured, almost sacred, retreat; after burying her mother in a mausoleum overlooking the lake, the Queen commissioned another, the Royal Mausoleum, for her husband Albert, Prince Consort and for herself, after Albert's death in 1861. (Note: As well as the royal mausolea, Frogmore is the site of the Royal Burial Ground, last resting place for a host of Victoria's lesser descendants.)

During her long widowhood, when she rarely visited London, Victoria spent much of her time at Windsor and at Frogmore. She undertook further building work in the gardens, employing Samuel Sanders Teulon to construct a teahouse, and had the Indian Kiosk installed. (Note: Geoffrey Tyack, Simon Bradley and Nikolaus Pevsner, in their Berkshire volume of the Buildings of England series, describe the kiosk as a "pretty, octagonal domed pavilion of white marble", while the garden historian George Plumptre notes its "exquisite oriental symmetry".) Victoria also engaged Thomas Willement to redecorate the Gothic Ruin. Victoria used the ruin as an outdoor breakfast room in the warmer summer months.

== Description ==
The Gothic Ruin is a single-storey building clad in castellated battlements to give the appearance of the ruin of a much older structure. It is an early example of the Gothic Revival style. The exact date of construction is uncertain; the Historic England listing suggests the 1790s, and other sources ascribe it to the very late 18th century. In 1975 it was designated a Grade II* listed building.

== Public access ==
Frogmore Gardens are opened to the public on a limited number of days each year, under the National Garden Scheme.

== See also ==
- Grade II* listed buildings in Berkshire

== Sources ==
- St Aubyn, Giles (1991). Queen Victoria: A Portrait. London: Sinclair-Stevenson. ISBN 978-1-856-19086-2. OCLC 636229918.
- Plumptre, George (1981). Royal Gardens. London: William Collins, Sons. ISBN 978-0-002-11871-2. OCLC 833434627.
- Royal Collection Trust (1997). Frogmore House and The Royal Mausoleum. London: Royal Collection. OCLC 57354259.
- Tyack, Geoffrey; Bradley, Simon; Pevsner, Nikolaus (2010). Berkshire. The Buildings Of England. Yale University Press. ISBN 978-0-300-12662-4.
