= Indian Kiosk, Frogmore =

Indian Kiosk
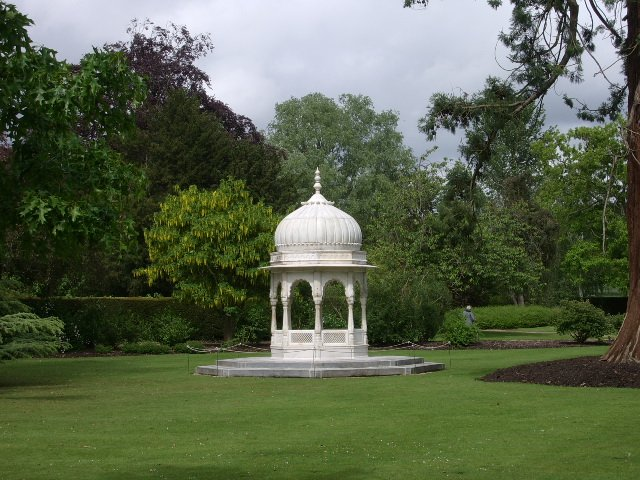
- “A pretty, domed pavilion of white marble”
- Interactive map of the Indian Kiosk area

General information
- Architectural style: Mughal
- Location: Frogmore, Home Park, Windsor, Berkshire
- Coordinates: 51.4758°N 0.5976°W
- Governing body: Crown Estate

Listed Building – Grade II
- Official name: Kiosk to the southeast of cottage on Frogmore Grounds
- Designated: 2 October 1985
- Reference no.: 1319306

The Indian Kiosk is located at Frogmore, in the Home Park of Windsor Castle, in Berkshire, England. The kiosk comes from India and was originally designed for the Qaisar Bagh, a palace complex in the city of Lucknow. The palace was looted by British soldiers following the suppression of the Indian Rebellion of 1857 and the kiosk was brought to England by Charles Canning, Governor-General of India, and presented to Queen Victoria. The Queen sited it in her private gardens at Frogmore, near the mausoleum to her mother. It is a Grade II listed structure.

== History ==
Wajid Ali Shah (1832-1887), the last Nawab of Awadh, built the Qaisar Bagh palace complex in his capital city, Lucknow, between 1847 and 1856. It comprised a series of courts, with pools and gardens, surrounding the central palace. The complex was designed in the Mughal style and the gardens were decorated with “many small marble pavilions and kiosks”. (Note: Contemporary European critics were dismissive of the architectural style deployed at Lucknow. Alois Anton Führer, a German Indologist employed by the Archaeological Survey of India, and subsequently Director of the Lucknow Provincial Museum, described the Qaisar Bagh buildings as "the most debased examples of architecture to be found in India".) Ali Shah was deposed by the British in 1856, and Oudh State annexed by the British East India Company. This action caused enormous resentment and the population of Lucknow was enthusiastic in support of the Indian Rebellion which broke out the following year. The siege of the Lucknow Residency lasted almost six months, and the subsequent retaking of the city in March 1858 saw the looting and destruction of the Qaisar Bagh. (Note: The reprisals on the retaking of the city were savage; the Swedish artist Egron Lundgren, travelling with Colin Campbell, the British Commander-in-Chief, recorded the devastation and the deaths, writing of the looting of Lucknow, "there was something almost refreshing in destruction on so grand a scale".) Charles Canning selected the kiosk as a tribute to Queen Victoria and had it shipped to England in 1858.

Frogmore House and its estate were bought by George III for his wife Queen Charlotte in 1792, although the land had formed part of the Windsor royal hunting ground since the reign of Henry VIII. Charlotte engaged James Wyatt to redesign the house and sought the advice of her Vice-Chamberlain, William Price, regarding the redevelopment of the grounds. (Note: Charlotte’s ambition was to create a Paradis Terrestre, a secluded enclave enabling an escape from the rituals of court and modelled on the, almost contemporary, Hameau de la Reine at Versailles.) Price's brother Uvedale, an early exponent of the Picturesque, clearly influenced the design. In 1840, Frogmore was inherited by the Duchess of Kent and, following her death in 1861, by her daughter, Queen Victoria. The estate became a favoured, almost sacred, retreat; after burying her mother in a mausoleum overlooking the lake, the Queen commissioned another, the Royal Mausoleum, for her husband Prince Albert and for herself, after Albert's death in 1861. (Note: As well as the royal mausolea, Frogmore is the site of the Royal Burial Ground, last resting place for a host of Victoria’s lesser descendants.)

During her long widowhood, when she rarely visited London, Victoria spent much of her time at Windsor and at Frogmore. She undertook further building work in the gardens, employing Samuel Sanders Teulon to construct a teahouse, and engaging Thomas Willement to redecorate the Gothic Ruin, originally designed by Wyatt and Princess Elizabeth. In this setting Victoria placed the Indian Kiosk, and in her later years would often undertake correspondence in a tent set up nearby, attended by her Indian servant Abdul Karim.

== Architecture and description ==
The kiosk is constructed entirely in marble with open arches and an onion dome roof. Geoffrey Tyack, Simon Bradley and Nikolaus Pevsner, in their Berkshire volume of the Buildings of England series, describe it as a “pretty, octagonal domed pavilion of white marble”. The garden historian George Plumptre notes its “exquisite oriental symmetry”. The kiosk is a Grade II listed structure. Teulon's Teahouse also has a Grade II listing while James Wyatt's nearby Gothic Ruin is designated Grade II*.

== Public access ==
Frogmore Gardens are opened to the public on a limited number of days each year, under the National Garden Scheme.

== Sources ==
- St Aubyn, Giles (1991). Queen Victoria: A Portrait. London: Sinclair-Stevenson. ISBN 978-1-856-19086-2. OCLC 636229918.
- Metcalf, Thomas R. (1989). An Imperial Vision: Indian Architecture and Britain's Raj. London: Faber & Faber. ISBN 978-0-571-15419-7. OCLC 835581414.
- Morris, Jan (1986). Stones of Empire: The Buildings of the Raj. Oxford, UK: Oxford University Press. ISBN 978-0-192-82036-5. OCLC 473765817.
- Plumptre, George (1981). Royal Gardens. London: William Collins, Sons. ISBN 978-0-002-11871-2. OCLC 833434627.
- Royal Collection Trust (1997). Frogmore House and The Royal Mausoleum. London: Royal Collection. OCLC 57354259.
- Tyack, Geoffrey; Bradley, Simon; Pevsner, Nikolaus (2010). Berkshire. The Buildings Of England. Yale University Press. ISBN 978-0-300-12662-4.
