= Queen Victoria's Teahouse, Frogmore =

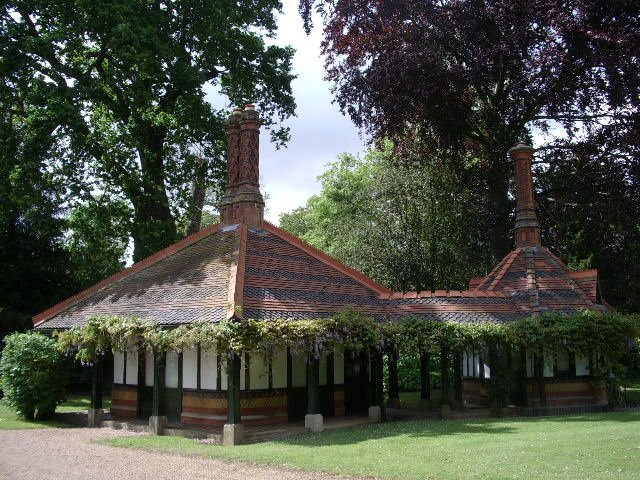
- Interactive map of the Queen Victoria's Teahouse, Frogmore area

General information
- Type: Summer house
- Architectural style: Tudor Revival
- Location: Frogmore, Home Park, Windsor, Berkshire
- Coordinates: 51.4732°N 0.5931°W
- Construction started: 1869
- Governing body: Crown Estate

Listed Building – Grade II
- Official name: Tea House to South of Frogmore House in Frogmore Grounds
- Designated: 2 October 1975
- Reference no.: 1117779

Design and construction
- Architect: Samuel Sanders Teulon

Queen Victoria's Teahouse is located at Frogmore, in the Home Park of Windsor Castle, in Berkshire, England. Designed by Samuel Sanders Teulon in the mid-19th century, the structure is a summer house intended for the taking of tea. It is a Grade II listed building.

== History ==
Frogmore House and its estate were bought by George III for his wife Queen Charlotte in 1792, although the land had formed part of the Windsor royal hunting ground since the reign of Henry VIII. Charlotte engaged James Wyatt to redesign the house and sought the advice of her Vice-Chamberlain, William Price, regarding the redevelopment of the grounds. (Note: Charlotte’s ambition was to create a Paradis Terrestre, a secluded enclave enabling an escape from the rituals of court and modelled on the, almost contemporary, Hameau de la Reine at Versailles.) Price's brother Uvedale, an early exponent of the Picturesque, clearly influenced the design.

In 1840, Frogmore was inherited by the Duchess of Kent and, following her death in 1861, by her daughter, Queen Victoria. The estate became a favoured, almost sacred, retreat; after burying her mother in a mausoleum overlooking the lake, the Queen commissioned another, the Royal Mausoleum, for her husband Prince Albert of Saxe-Coburg and Gotha and for herself, after Albert's death in 1861. (Note: As well as the royal mausolea, Frogmore is the site of the Royal Burial Ground, last resting place for a host of Victoria’s lesser descendants.)

During her long widowhood, when she rarely visited London, Victoria spent much of her time at Windsor and at Frogmore. She undertook further building work in the gardens, employing Samuel Sanders Teulon to construct the teahouse. Historic England gives a construction date of 1869. Victoria also had the Indian Kiosk installed, (Note: Geoffrey Tyack, Simon Bradley and Nikolaus Pevsner, in their Berkshire volume of the Buildings of England series, describe the kiosk as a “pretty, octagonal domed pavilion of white marble”, while the garden historian George Plumptre notes its “exquisite oriental symmetry”.) and engaged Thomas Willement to redecorate the Gothic Ruin originally designed by Wyatt and Princess Elizabeth.

== Description ==
The teahouse consists of two pavilions, joined by a loggia and clad in brick and timber. The roofs are covered in alternating bands of black and red tiles. The style is Tudor Revival; a review in The New York Times describing it as looking "as if it had been made of gingerbread". It is a Grade II listed structure.

== Public access ==
Frogmore Gardens are opened to the public on a limited number of days each year, under the National Garden Scheme.

== Sources ==
- St Aubyn, Giles (1991). Queen Victoria: A Portrait. London: Sinclair-Stevenson. ISBN 978-1-856-19086-2. OCLC 636229918.
- Plumptre, George (1981). Royal Gardens. London: William Collins, Sons. ISBN 978-0-002-11871-2. OCLC 833434627.
- Royal Collection Trust (1997). Frogmore House and The Royal Mausoleum. London: Royal Collection. OCLC 57354259.
- Tyack, Geoffrey; Bradley, Simon; Pevsner, Nikolaus (2010). Berkshire. The Buildings Of England. Yale University Press. ISBN 978-0-300-12662-4.
