= Royal Household Cricket Club =

The Royal Household Cricket Club is a cricket team representing the Royal Households of the United Kingdom. The club plays its home matches at Frogmore in Windsor, within the Home Park of Windsor Castle. It was founded in 1905 by King Edward VII, who was a keen supporter and granted the club permission to use the royal racing colours of scarlet, purple and gold. The club also uses the royal crown as its emblem. The club plays many charity games each year, in support of The Royal Foundation as well as military sides from across the Armed Forces. They also travel abroad on overseas tours in support of the Royal Family which have previously included Vatican City, Akrotiri Cyprus, Porto, Singapore and Corfu.

Biannually the Club runs 2 week long Cricket Festivals in support of charities.

Although the club's members are mostly Royal Household staff supplemented by local cricketers if they are short-handed, members of the British royal family have previously made appearances for the club. In 1905, two future kings, Edward VIII (then Prince Edward) and George VI (then Prince Albert) played on opposite sides in a match between the club and Eton College. More recently, Prince Philip has played for the club and served as its President since 1953 until his death. Queen Elizabeth II was the club's patron throughout her reign.

The clubs current President is Prince Edward, Duke of Edinburgh, and their Patron is King Charles III.
