= Shaw Farm, Windsor =

Farm in Windsor Great Park, England

Coordinates: 51°28′08″N 0°36′04″W

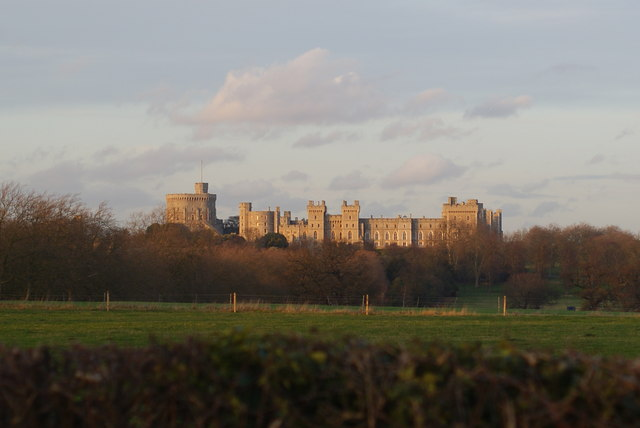
Fields of Shaw Farm, looking towards Windsor Castle

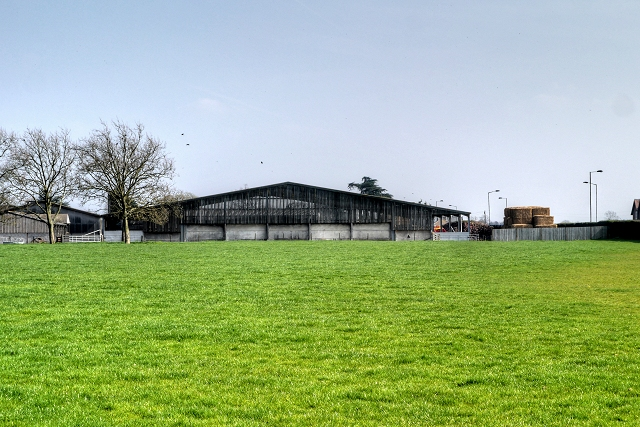
Farm buildings

Shaw Farm is on the royal estate at Windsor. Originally a home farm for Windsor Castle, by the early 19th century it came into the ownership of Princess Augusta Sophia. Upon her death in 1840, it was purchased by the Crown Estate. In 1851, the tenant farmer was evicted and the tenancy taken over by Albert, Prince Consort. Albert ran it as a model farm and constructed a number of buildings, including a new farmhouse and workers' dwellings. Albert raised a variety of livestock including prize-winning Clydesdale horses. Following Albert's death, the farm was used to house exotic livestock given to Queen Victoria.

== Early history ==
The farm has its origins as a home farm for the supply of produce to the nearby Windsor Castle. During the medieval period it encompassed a large portion of the land south of the River Thames that lay between Windsor and Old Windsor. It adjoined the Frogmore estate but was both larger and older. Much of the southern portion of the Shaw estate was enclosed in the 14th century to form Windsor Great Park. The estate came into the ownership of the Crown during the reign of Edward IV (1461-1483), at which time it extended across 300 acres (120 ha). The estate was generally leased out to tenants; from the late 16th century until the Stuart Restoration this was the Braham family. In 1670 the estate was leased to Thomas Lisle and his son-in-law Richard Reeve; part of the land was unlawfully sub-let by one of their tenants as a brickworks and trees were also cut down. The estate grew to 315 acres (127 ha) before 30 acres (12 ha) were removed from the 1670s to extend Little Park and the Long Walk. In May 1683 Lisle's widow, Anne, received the rights to timber from 80 elm trees and two oak trees in recompense for the land lost and given access rights across the Long Walk, which now divided her estate. At the same time the Crown reserved the right to use part of the land for the digging of clay for bricks and removed a further 11 acres (4.5 ha) of enclosed land that had belonged to an ancient manor house.

The tenancy rights were purchased from Anne Lisle and her grandson Horatio Moore by William Aldworth in the 1690s, he also renewed the tenancy of Frogmore (which he had inherited in the 1670s) at the same time. Aldworth's 1697 map of the two estates is the first known map of the Shaw estate and shows the two properties much intermixed; the Shaw Estate was centred on Shaw Farm but extended west of Long Walk and east to Old Windsor. Aldworth renewed the lease on both estates for 99 years from May 1699.

By the early 19th century, it was owned by Princess Augusta Sophia and tenanted to the Voules family. It was extended in 1817 during the enclosure of Windsor and in the early part of Queen Victoria's reign, with the demolition of labourer's dwellings, formerly a hospital granted to the Crown by the Windsor Corporation in 1784. In September 1840, the farm was purchased by the Crown Estate, upon the death of Augusta.

The land was let by the Crown to a Mr Watkins and, after his death in 1845, to his son-in-law Charles Cantrell. Further land had been added to the farm in 1843 with the Crown's purchase of the Keppel estate to the south and east.

== Albert's model farm ==
The farm and environs as depicted in an 1863 work on Albert's farms

Victoria's husband Prince Albert had managed the nearby Home Farm since 1841 and looked to expand his land, which was used as a model farm. In February 1851, Cantrell was advised that his tenancy would be ended in favour of one to Albert. Cantrell unsuccessfully petitioned for compensation. The decision may also have been made as the construction of Albert Road around this time divided the Shaw Farm lands and may have affected its viability to a commercial tenant. Albert's annual rent to the Crown Estate was almost £250 (equivalent to £6,035 in 2025).

Albert constructed a number of new buildings on the site before his death in 1861. These were half-funded by Albert and half by the Crown Estate. Albert showed concern for the welfare of his workers and an eight-roomed house with tower was constructed north of the main farm buildings for their lodgings. Two labourer's cottages were built on Albert Road from 1852, at a cost of £450 (equivalent to £54,316 in 2025), and a new farmhouse during 1853-54 at a cost of £5,691 (equivalent to £625,168 in 2025). The farm was regarded as well-equipped by early-Victorian standards with stables, cattle boxes, stalls, poultry house, piggeries, a covered sheep shed and manure tank.

Albert delegated the general running of the farm to Lieutenant-General William Wemyss (died 1852) and then to his stewards, Mr Wilson and then Mr Tait. Albert introduced a short-horned dairy cattle herd in 1853. He also bred Clydesdale horses with which he won Royal Agricultural Society of England prizes, Berkshire pigs and Cheviot sheep.

== Victorian era ==
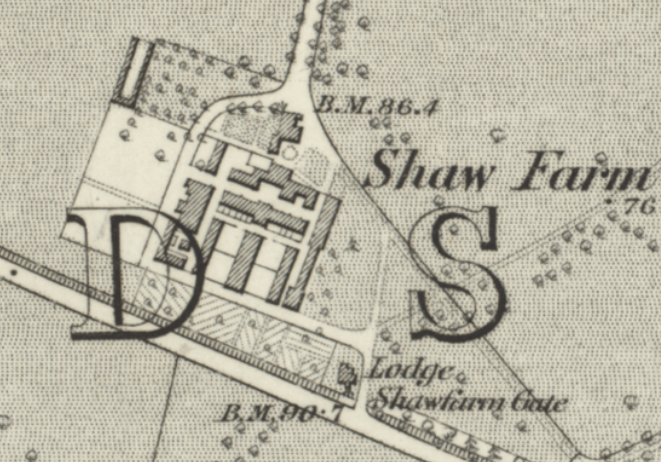
Shaw Farm on an 1881 map

By 1862, the year following Albert's death, the farm amounted to 308 acres (125 ha), of which 102 acres (41 ha) was used for arable crops and the remainder as pasture. The farm was worked by six pairs of plough horses and employed thirty men full time, with more on a seasonal basis. A painting of the farm in this period is held by the Royal Collection Trust.

The farm was used to house a number of exotic livestock given to the queen. This included Zebu cattle presented by the Maharajah of Mysore in 1862, Zulu cattle from Garnet Wolseley, 1st Viscount Wolseley, in 1880, wild boar sent from Sandringham by Edward, Prince of Wales, and a kangaroo. The farmhouse contained a suite of rooms for Victoria from which she could directly enter the poultry department.

== Recent history ==
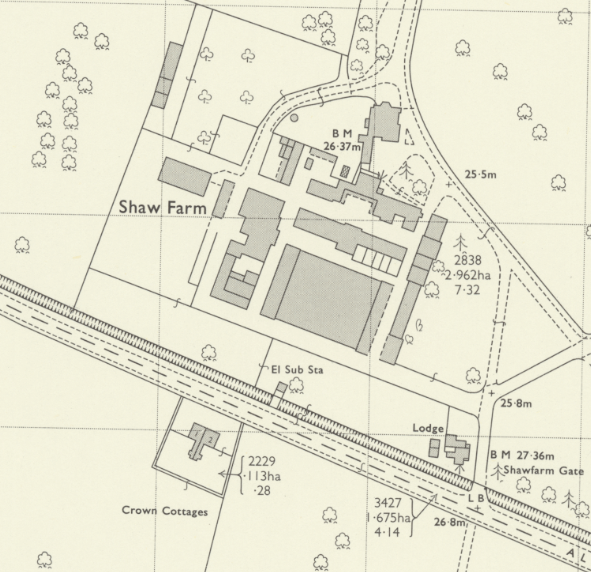
The farm on a 1972 Ordnance Survey map

The site remains an active farm. During the state funeral of Elizabeth II on 19 September 2022, the procession to Windsor Castle began from the Shaw Farm gate on Albert Road, where it was joined by the state hearse carrying the Queen's coffin from London. The gate was regularly used by Prince William and his family when they lived at nearby Adelaide Cottage. On the night of 13 October 2024 Shaw Farm was subject to a burglary, with a pick-up truck and quad bike stolen from a barn on the site and the farm gate destroyed in their getaway.
