= Venus Garden (Windsor Castle) =

Garden at Windsor Castle

Coordinates: 51.4837°N 0.6009°W

- Type: Parterre garden
- Location: Windsor Castle
- Owner: King Charles III in right of the Crown

The Venus Garden (formerly known as the East Terrace Garden) is a parterre garden at Windsor Castle in England. The garden is located on the east side of Windsor Castle and was redesigned in 2026 by Charles III. The redesign of the garden included the renaming of the garden to Venus Garden; this derives from the new design of the garden which follows the path of the planet Venus as it orbits the Sun.

The garden was reopened to the public in the summer of 2026.

== History ==
=== Origins ===
The origins of the garden can be traced back to the 1650s when Charles II, after extending the castle's existing north terrace, landscaped the lawns to the east as three bowling greens.

=== First East Terrace Garden ===
The first East Terrace garden was created by George IV in the early nineteenth century. Charles Long, 1st Baron Farnborough, designed an enclosed formal garden for George IV, although the architect Jeffry Wyatville was responsible for the final design. The same architect designed the new east wing of Windsor Castle, wherein are found George IV's semi-state apartments which look out onto the garden. At the same time George IV closed what was then Little Park to the public.

The completed garden had varieties of exotic plant life, many of which died in the subsequent winter and had to be replaced. It also contained sculptures cast in Rome by Hubert Le Sueur during the reign of Charles I, representing classical gods and goddesses and a Roman gladiator. These were originally displayed at St James's Palace and the Palace of Whitehall before the Civil War, when they were sold off by Oliver Cromwell. The works were returned upon the Restoration, later being brought to Windsor for installation in the new East Terrace Garden.

The garden also included an orangery, which is built into the north wall of the garden, and held 34 orange trees gifted from Charles X of France to George IV.

=== 19th century ===
William IV and then Queen Victoria both opened the garden to the public. During Victoria's reign a set of stairs were built in the Prince of Wales's Tower to allow the royal family to travel from the castle to the orangery in private. Later in Victoria's reign the garden was redesigned by Prince Albert; during this time Little Park was converted into the private Home Park. Victoria recorded in her diary:

"Albert is daily occupied…in superintending the planting of the garden in the inside of the Terrace. The plots were before so scrubby & scraggy, but are now being very nicely arranged with laurustinus, bays, &c."

— Queen Victoria, Queen Victoria's Journal

=== 20th century ===
During the Second World War the garden was again transformed, into a Victory Garden in which vegetables were grown to aid the national shortages and rationing caused by the war. A small allotment was kept for the Princesses Elizabeth and Margaret to grow their own produce.

After the war, during the reign of Elizabeth II, the Duke of Edinburgh redesigned the garden, planting 3,500 rose bushes. Also installed was a fountain to the Duke's design, which took the shape of a lotus flower.

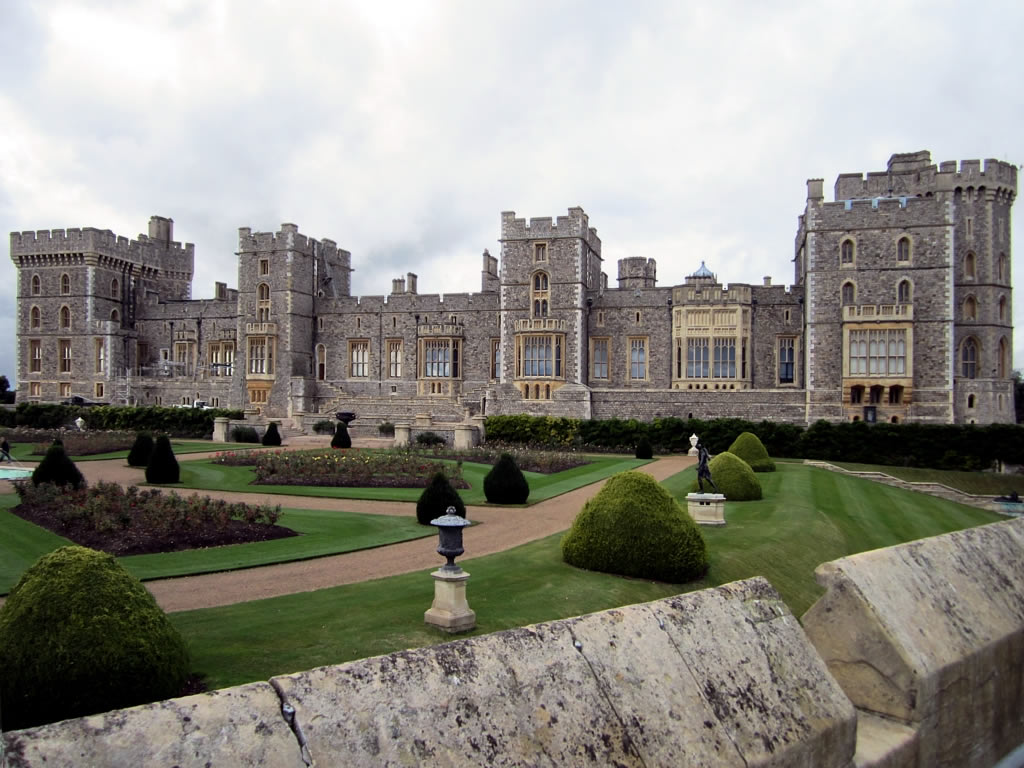
A view of the East Terrace Garden in 2012

== Present day ==
The most recent redesign of the garden was in 2026, by Charles III. The redesign focused on the path of the orbit of Venus, which resembles a five-petalled floral pattern over an eight-year period. It consists of a variety of wildflower meadows and various plant types, and contains 11,000 spring bulbs, designed to support local wildlife and insects, which reflects the King's longstanding commitment to sustainability.

The original bronze sculptures introduced by George IV remain in a prominent position within the garden. They have been joined with new garden ornaments and sculptures as part of the redesign.
