= Frogmore Cottage =

Historic building in Windsor, UK

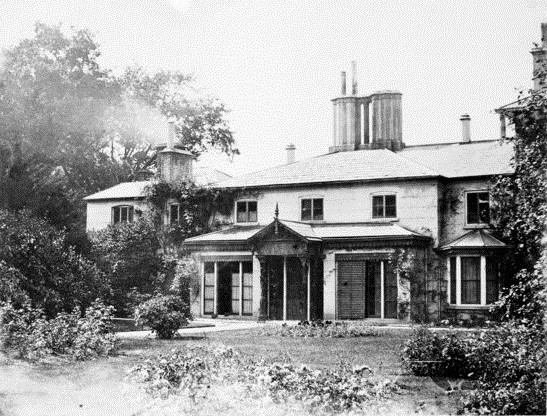
- The cottage in 1872
- Interactive map of the Frogmore Cottage area

General information
- Location: Frogmore, Home Park, Windsor, Berkshire, England
- Coordinates: 51.4763°N 0.5980°W
- Completed: 1801
- Owner: The Crown Estate

Listed Building – Grade II
- Official name: Frogmore Cottage in Frogmore Grounds
- Reference no.: 1117778

Frogmore Cottage is a historic Grade II listed home on the Frogmore estate, which is part of Home Park in Windsor, England. The cottage was described as a 5,089 sq ft (472.8 m^{2}), five bedroom and nursery, four bathroom single-residence house in 2020.

Built in 1801 at the direction of Queen Charlotte in the gardens near Frogmore House, Frogmore Cottage is part of the Crown Estate, the British monarch's public estate.

== History ==
The cottage was originally known as Double Garden Cottage and was listed in Queen Charlotte's 1801 accounts for her garden as having been built for £450 by a Mr Bowen. Queen Victoria had breakfast at the cottage on 28 June 1875 and noted an "immense number of little frogs" which she found "quite disgusting". The cottage has been listed Grade II on the National Heritage List for England since October 1975. The listing provides little of the history: "Early C19 plain 2 storey house with parapet. Centre break with porch. Glazing bar sashes. Stucco faced".

=== 19th and 20th century occupants ===
The cottage was a retreat for Charlotte, the queen consort of George III, and her unmarried daughters. The theologian Henry James Sr. and his family lived at the cottage in the 1840s. A personal secretary of Queen Victoria, Abdul Karim, moved to Frogmore Cottage in 1897 with his wife and father. Grand Duchess Xenia Alexandrovna in exile from her native Russia after the Russian Revolution stayed there in the 1920s.

=== 21st century occupants ===
In the early 21st century, Frogmore Cottage was a series of five separate units housing Windsor estate workers. In 2019, it was provided to the Duke and Duchess of Sussex as a grace and favour home by Elizabeth II, and converted into a four-bedroom-and-nursery single-family home at a reported cost of £2.4 million from the Sovereign Grant prior to the birth of their son, Archie, in May 2019. As a property of a royal palace of state and designated heritage site, Frogmore Cottage was scheduled to be renovated in any event, regardless of occupant.

In January 2020, Buckingham Palace announced that the Duke and Duchess of Sussex were stepping down as senior working members of the royal family and shared the couple's "wish to repay Sovereign Grant expenditure for the refurbishment of Frogmore Cottage" as they were relocating to North America. In September 2020, £2.4 million was received, part of which was offset against rental payments due. Subsequently, the existing licence to occupy the property was extended to March 2022. By 2023, the couple were well-settled in their new principal place of residence in Montecito, California. The licence to occupy Frogmore was not re-extended, so they officially vacated.

Princess Eugenie - the younger daughter of Andrew Mountbatten-Windsor - and her husband, took up residence at the cottage in November 2020. In February 2022, the Duke of Sussex and his wife announced a desire to renew the licence to occupy, which would allow Harry to remain legally domiciled in the UK for citizenship and immigration purposes. In May 2022, Eugenie reportedly vacated.

Meghan Markle and Prince Harry were told 'to vacate' their UK home and in March 2023, Prince Andrew, Duke of York had been offered Frogmore Cottage in exchange for surrendering his lease on the nearby thirty-room Royal Lodge in Windsor Great Park after he had paid $16.3 million in February 2022 to settle the civil sexual assault case Virginia Giuffre brought against him in the US.
