= Royal Burial Ground, Frogmore =

Cemetery in Berkshire, England

Coordinates: 51°28′26.4″N 0°35′54.9″W

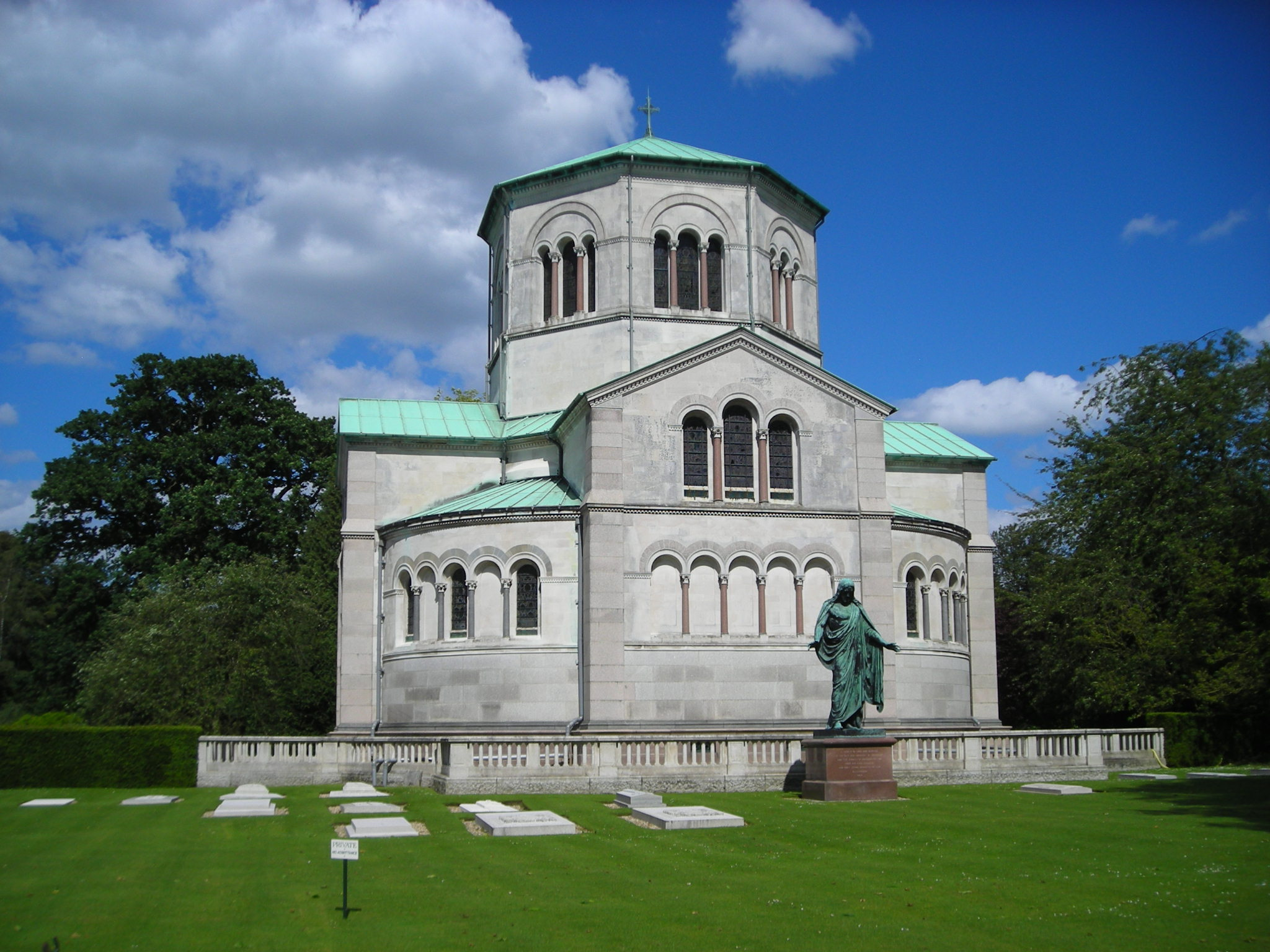
Queen Victoria's Royal Mausoleum at Frogmore and the Royal Burial Ground (front)

The Royal Burial Ground is a cemetery used by the British royal family. Consecrated on 23 October 1928 by the Bishop of Oxford, it is adjacent to the Royal Mausoleum, which was built in 1862 to house the tomb of Queen Victoria and Prince Albert. The burial ground lies on the Frogmore estate within the Home Park at Windsor, in the English county of Berkshire.

== Overview ==
The burial ground was established because the Royal Vault under St George's Chapel, Windsor Castle was becoming full; by 1928, there had been 23 interments since 1810. King George V allowed the burial ground to be made with the intention that in the future, only British sovereigns and those in the direct line of succession would be buried in the Royal Vault.

Many members of the Royal Family, generally except for sovereigns and their consorts, have been interred in the Royal Burial Ground, among them Queen Victoria's children (Princess Helena, 1846–1923; Prince Arthur, 1850–1942; Princess Louise, 1848–1939) and one sovereign: Edward VIII, 1894–1972. In the adjacent Frogmore Gardens stands the Duchess of Kent's Mausoleum built in 1861 for Queen Victoria's mother.

== Burials ==
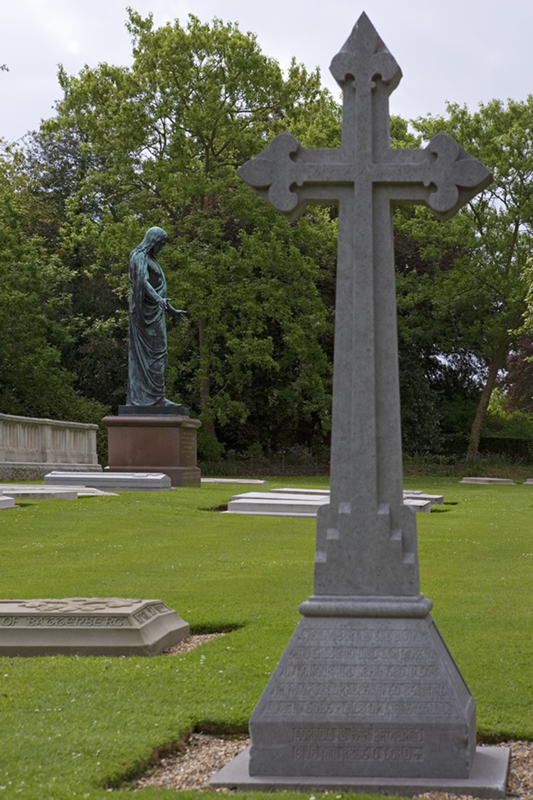
Royal Burial Ground, Frogmore

=== Buried in 1928: previously interred at St George's Chapel ===
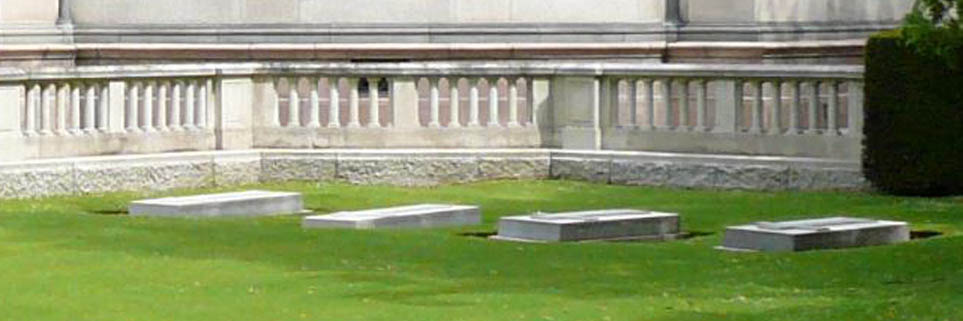
Schleswig-Holstein plot at Royal Burial Ground, Frogmore

Some members of the British royal family were reburied at this cemetery in 1928, having previously been interred in the Royal Vault at St George's Chapel.

- 1928 Prince Harald of Schleswig-Holstein (1876–1876), son of Princess Helena of the United Kingdom. Interred in the Royal Vault at St George's Chapel until transferred to the Royal Burial Ground in late October 1928. His coffin is in the same grave as that of his mother.
- 1928 Prince Francis of Teck (1870–1910), brother of Queen Mary. Funeral at St George's Chapel on 5 November 1910, then interred in the Royal Vault at St George's Chapel; transferred to the Royal Burial Ground in late October 1928.
- 1928 Princess Louise Margaret, Duchess of Connaught and Strathearn (1860–1917), wife of Prince Arthur, Duke of Connaught and Strathearn and viceregal consort of Canada. Cremated on the evening of 18 March 1917 at Golders Green Crematorium as first member of the Royal Family to be cremated, ashes put in an oak coffin for funeral at St George's Chapel on 19 March 1917, then placed in the Royal Vault at St George's Chapel; transferred to the Royal Burial Ground in late October 1928.
- 1928 Prince Christian of Schleswig-Holstein (1831–1917), husband of Princess Helena of the United Kingdom. Funeral at St George's Chapel on 1 November 1917, then interred in the Royal Vault at St George's Chapel; transferred to the Royal Burial Ground in late October 1928.
- 1928 Lord Leopold Mountbatten (1889–1922), grandson of Queen Victoria through his mother Princess Henry of Battenberg. Funeral at St George's Chapel on 1 May 1922, then interred in the Royal Vault at St George's Chapel; transferred to the Royal Burial Ground in late October 1928.
- 1928 Princess Helena of the United Kingdom (1846–1923), daughter of Queen Victoria, wife of Prince Christian of Schleswig-Holstein. Funeral at St George's Chapel on 15 June 1923, then interred in the Royal Vault at St George's Chapel; transferred to the Royal Burial Ground in late October 1928.
- 1928 Adolphus Cambridge, 1st Marquess of Cambridge (1868–1927), a former Prince of Teck and brother of Queen Mary and husband of Margaret Cambridge, Marchioness of Cambridge. Funeral at St George's Chapel on 29 October 1927, then interred in the Royal Vault at St George's Chapel; transferred to the Royal Burial Ground in late October 1928. His coffin is in the same grave as that of his wife.
- 1928 Rupert Cambridge, Viscount Trematon (1907–1928), son of Alexander Cambridge, 1st Earl of Athlone. Funeral at St George's Chapel on 19 April 1928, then interred in the Royal Vault at St George's Chapel; transferred to the Royal Burial Ground in late October 1928.

=== Burials 1929–1949 ===
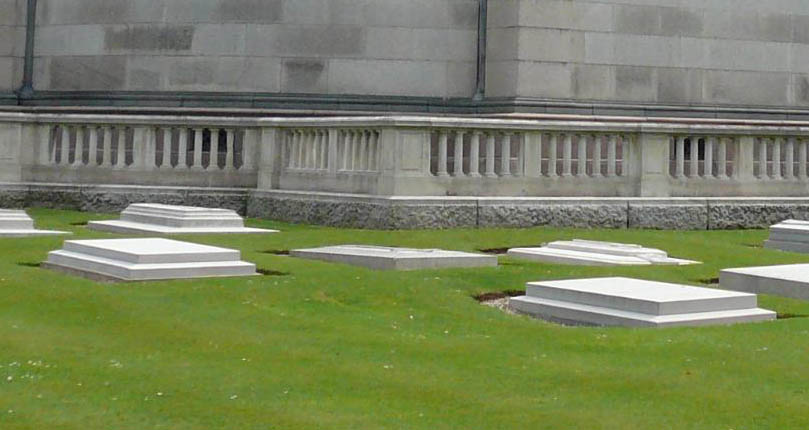
Princess Louise, Duchess of Argyll's grave (centre) at the Royal Burial Ground, Frogmore

- 1929 Margaret Cambridge, Marchioness of Cambridge (1873–1929), wife of the 1st Marquess of Cambridge. Funeral at St George's Chapel on 30 March 1929, then interred in the Royal Burial Ground. Her coffin is in the same grave as that of her husband.
- 1935 Princess Victoria of the United Kingdom (1868–1935), daughter of King Edward VII. Funeral at St George's Chapel on 7 December 1935, then interred in the Royal Burial Ground on 8 January 1936.
- 1938 Prince Arthur of Connaught (1883–1938), son of Prince Arthur, Duke of Connaught and husband of Princess Alexandra, 2nd Duchess of Fife. A former Governor-General of South Africa. Funeral at St George's Chapel on 16 September 1938, then interred in the Royal Vault at St George's Chapel; transferred to the Royal Burial Ground on 22 September 1938.
- 1940 Princess Louise, Duchess of Argyll (1848–1939), daughter of Queen Victoria, wife of the 9th Duke of Argyll and viceregal consort of Canada. Cremated at Golders Green Crematorium, ashes put in an oak coffin for funeral at St George's Chapel on 12 December 1939, then placed in the Royal Vault at St George's Chapel; transferred to the Royal Burial Ground on 13 March 1940.
- 1942 Prince Arthur, Duke of Connaught and Strathearn (1850–1942), son of Queen Victoria. A former Governor General of Canada. Funeral at St George's Chapel on 23 January 1942, then interred in the Royal Vault at St George's Chapel; transferred to the Royal Burial Ground on 18 March 1942.
- 1948 Princess Helena Victoria of Schleswig-Holstein (1870–1948), daughter of Princess Helena of the United Kingdom. Funeral at St George's Chapel on 17 March 1948, then interred in the Royal Burial Ground.

=== Burials 1950–1979 ===
- 1956 Princess Marie Louise of Schleswig-Holstein (1872–1956), daughter of Prince Christian of Schleswig-Holstein and Princess Helena of the United Kingdom and also granddaughter of Queen Victoria. Funeral at St George's Chapel on 14 December 1956, then interred in the Royal Burial Ground.
- 1957 Alexander Cambridge, 1st Earl of Athlone (1874–1957), brother of Queen Mary and husband of Princess Alice, Countess of Athlone. A former Prince of Teck, a former Governor-General of South Africa and a former Governor General of Canada. Funeral at St George's Chapel on 19 January 1957, then interred in the Royal Burial Ground. His coffin is in the same grave as that of his wife.
- 1968 Prince George, Duke of Kent (1902–1942), son of King George V, husband of Princess Marina, Duchess of Kent. Funeral at St George's Chapel on 29 August 1942, then interred in the Royal Vault at St George's Chapel; transferred to the Royal Burial Ground on 29 August 1968, the day before his wife's funeral.
- 1968 Princess Marina, Duchess of Kent (1906–1968), wife of Prince George, Duke of Kent. Interred in the Royal Burial Ground on 30 August 1968.
- 1972 Edward VIII, (1894–1972), eldest son of King George V and later Prince Edward, Duke of Windsor. A former Governor of the Bahamas. Funeral at St George's Chapel on 5 June 1972, then interred in the Royal Burial Ground.
- 1972 Prince William of Gloucester (1941–1972), son of Prince Henry, Duke of Gloucester. Interred in the Royal Burial Ground on 2 September 1972.
- 1972 Sir Alexander Ramsay (1881–1972), husband of Princess Patricia of Connaught and former Fifth Sea Lord. Interred in the Royal Burial Ground in October 1972.
- 1974 Lady Patricia Ramsay (1886–1974), daughter of Prince Arthur, Duke of Connaught, and wife of Sir Alexander Ramsay. Interred in the Royal Burial Ground in January 1974.
- 1974 Prince Henry, Duke of Gloucester (1900–1974), son of King George V, husband of Princess Alice, Duchess of Gloucester. A former Governor-General of Australia. Interred in the Royal Burial Ground on 14 June 1974.

=== Burials 1980–present ===
- 1981 Princess Alice, Countess of Athlone (1883–1981), last surviving grandchild of Queen Victoria and daughter of Prince Leopold, Duke of Albany, wife of Alexander Cambridge, 1st Earl of Athlone and viceregal consort of Canada and of South Africa. Funeral at St George's Chapel on 8 January 1981, then interred in the Royal Burial Ground. Her coffin is in the same grave as that of her husband.
- 1981 George Cambridge, 2nd Marquess of Cambridge (1895–1981), son of the 1st Marquess of Cambridge. Interred in the Royal Burial Ground on 23 April 1981. His coffin is in the same grave as that of his wife.
- 1986 Wallis, Duchess of Windsor (1896–1986), wife of Prince Edward, Duke of Windsor. Funeral at St George's Chapel on 29 April 1986, then interred in the Royal Burial Ground, next to the grave of her husband.
- 1988 Dorothy Cambridge, Marchioness of Cambridge (1899–1988), wife of The 2nd Marquess of Cambridge. Interred in the Royal Burial Ground in April 1988. Her coffin is in the same grave as that of her husband.
- 1994 Lady May Abel Smith (1906–1994), daughter of Princess Alice, Countess of Athlone and Alexander Cambridge, 1st Earl of Athlone, wife of Sir Henry Abel Smith. Interred in the Royal Burial Ground on 9 June 1994; her husband's ashes were buried there at the same time. Both are buried in the same grave.
- 1994 Sir Henry Abel Smith (1900–1993), husband of Lady May Abel Smith and former Governor of Queensland. Cremated, ashes interred in the Royal Burial Ground at the time of his wife's funeral there on 9 June 1994. Both are buried in the same grave.
- 2004 Princess Alice, Duchess of Gloucester (1901–2004), wife of Prince Henry, 1st Duke of Gloucester and viceregal consort of Australia. Funeral at St George's Chapel on 5 November 2004, then interred in the Royal Burial Ground.
- 2005 Sir Angus Ogilvy (1928–2004), husband of Princess Alexandra of Kent. Funeral at St George's Chapel on 5 January 2005, then interred in the Royal Burial Ground.
- 2025 Katharine, Duchess of Kent (1933–2025), wife of Prince Edward, Duke of Kent. Funeral at Westminster Cathedral on 16 September 2025, then interred in the Royal Burial Ground.

== Formerly buried at the Royal Burial Ground ==
- Queen Maria, Queen Mother of Yugoslavia (1900–1961), great-granddaughter of Queen Victoria, wife of King Alexander I of Yugoslavia. Died in London, funeral on 2 July 1961, then interred in the Royal Burial Ground. Remains were exhumed on 26 April 2013 and transferred to Oplenac, Serbia, on 28 April.

== Statue ==
The statue overlooking the ground is a copy of the Danish Neoclassical sculptor Bertel Thorvaldsen's Christ, originally conceived in 1821. The Frogmore copy was cast in 1903 at the bronze foundry Lauritz Rasmussen in Copenhagen. It was commissioned by the Danish-born Queen Alexandra in memory of her mother-in-law, Queen Victoria.

== Public access ==
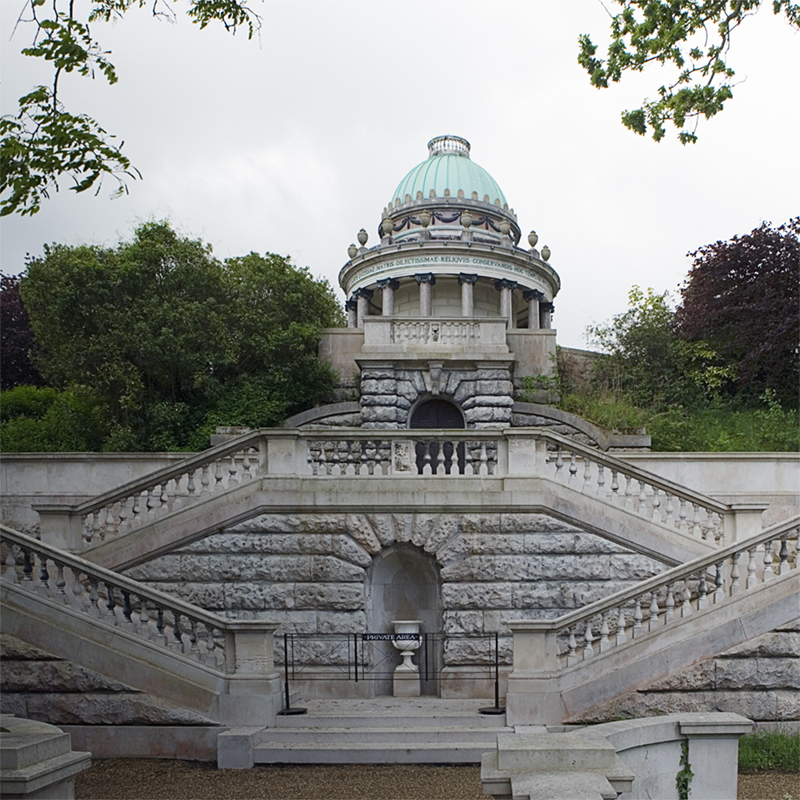
The Duchess of Kent's Mausoleum

Frogmore House and its gardens are usually open to the public on about six days each year, usually around Easter and the August Bank Holiday.

The Royal Burial Ground may be viewed from around its perimeter on the days that the gardens are open to the public. The Duchess of Kent's Mausoleum may also be viewed externally, but is never open to the public.

The Royal Mausoleum, the resting place of Queen Victoria and her husband Prince Albert, is structurally unsound and has been closed to the public since 2007. It was reported in August 2011 that repairs might not be completed for a further ten years. The Royal Mausoleum formerly was open on the Wednesday nearest to Queen Victoria's birthday, 24 May, and occasionally on other days when the grounds were open. Restoration of the mausoleum began in June 2018, to create a dry moat around it and to replace the roof to protect it from the long-standing problem of water infiltration.
