= Frogmore =

Royal estate in Berkshire, England

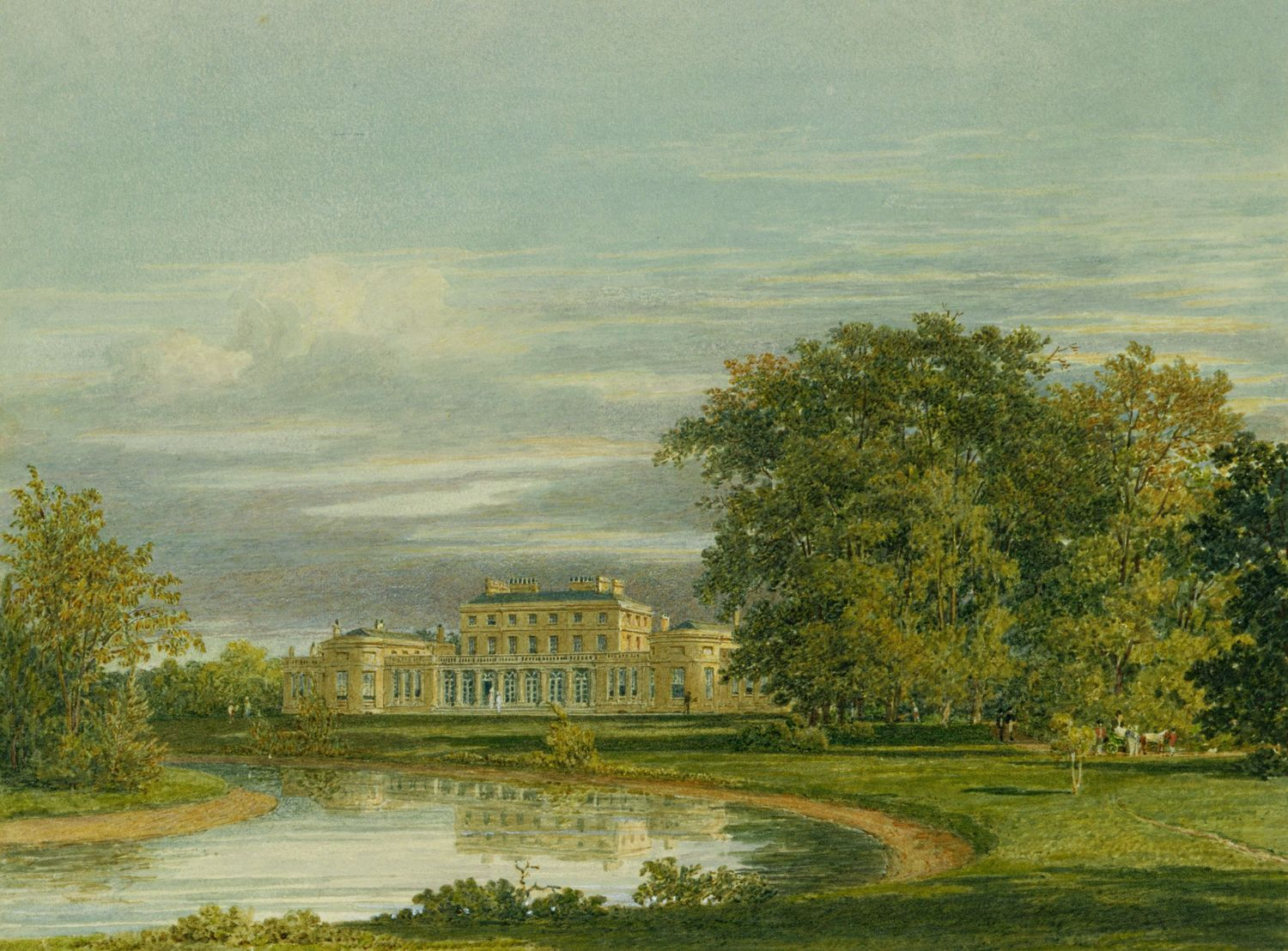
- An early 19th-century watercolour by Charles Wild, showing Frogmore House from the lake

- Location within Berkshire
- 51.4743°N 0.5944°W
- Location: Home Park, Windsor, Berkshire, England

Site notes
- Governing body: The Crown Estate
- Owner: King Charles III

National Register of Historic Parks and Gardens
- Official name: The Royal Estate, Windsor: Frogmore Gardens
- Designated: 30 September 1987
- Reference no.: 1000587

Listed Building – Grade II*
- Official name: Gothic Ruin of Temple by Lake in Frogmore Gardens
- Designated: 2 October 1975
- Reference no.: 1319305

Listed Building – Grade II
- Official name: Kiosk to South East of Cottage in Frogmore Grounds
- Designated: 2 October 1975
- Reference no.: 1319306

Listed Building – Grade II
- Official name: Bridge from Island Leading to Duchess of Kent's Mausoleum
- Designated: 2 October 1975
- Reference no.: 1319267

Listed Building – Grade II
- Official name: Tea House to South of Frogmore House in Frogmore Grounds
- Designated: 2 October 1975
- Reference no.: 1117779

Frogmore is an estate within the Home Park, adjoining Windsor Castle, in Berkshire, England. It comprises 33 acres (130,000 m^{2}), of primarily private gardens managed by the Crown Estate. It is the location of Frogmore House, a royal retreat, and Frogmore Cottage. The name derives from the preponderance of frogs which have always lived in this low-lying and marshy area near the River Thames. This area is part of the local flood plain. Its large landscaped gardens are Grade I listed on the Register of Historic Parks and Gardens.

Part of the gardens of the estate are set aside as burial places for members of the British royal family: the Royal Mausoleum (containing the tomb of Queen Victoria and Prince Albert); the Royal Burial Ground; and the Duchess of Kent's Mausoleum (the tomb of Queen Victoria's mother).

== Frogmore House and grounds ==
Frogmore House was built in the 1680s and in 1792 the house and estate were bought by George III for his wife Queen Charlotte, although the land had formed part of the Windsor royal hunting ground since the reign of Henry VIII. Charlotte engaged James Wyatt to redesign the house and sought the advice of her Vice-Chamberlain, William Price, regarding the redevelopment of the grounds. (Note: Charlotte’s ambition was to create a Paradis Terrestre, a secluded enclave enabling an escape from the rituals of court and modelled on the, almost contemporary, Hameau de la Reine at Versailles.) Price’s brother Uvedale, an early exponent of the Picturesque, clearly influenced the design. In 1840, Frogmore was inherited by the Duchess of Kent and, following her death in 1861, by her daughter, Queen Victoria. The estate became a favoured, almost sacred, retreat; after burying her mother in a mausoleum overlooking the lake, the Queen commissioned another, the Royal Mausoleum, for her husband Albert, Prince Consort and for herself, after Albert’s death in 1861.

During her long widowhood, when she rarely visited London, Victoria spent much of her time at Windsor and at Frogmore. She undertook further building work in the gardens, employing Samuel Sanders Teulon to construct a teahouse, and engaging Thomas Willement to redecorate the Gothic Ruin, originally designed by Wyatt and Princess Elizabeth. In this setting Victoria placed the Indian Kiosk, and in her later years would often undertake correspondence in a tent set up nearby, attended by her Indian servant Abdul Karim.

In 1900 Louis Mountbatten, 1st Earl Mountbatten of Burma was born at Frogmore House. On the estate near the House is Frogmore Cottage, built for Queen Charlotte around 1801. Frogmore Gardens are Grade I listed.

== Places of burial ==
=== Duchess of Kent's Mausoleum ===
The first of two mausoleums within the Frogmore Gardens is the burial place of Queen Victoria's mother, Victoria of Saxe-Coburg-Saalfeld, the Duchess of Kent. The Mausoleum was designed by the architect A J Humbert, to a concept design by Prince Albert's favourite artist, Professor Ludwig Gruner.

In the latter years of her life, the Duchess lived in Frogmore House and in the 1850s, construction began on a beautiful domed 'temple' in the grounds of the estate. The top portion of the finished building was intended to serve as a summer-house for the Duchess during her lifetime, while the lower level was destined as her final resting place. The Duchess died at Frogmore House on 16 March 1861 before the summer-house was completed so the upper chamber became part of the mausoleum and now contains a statue of the Duchess by William Theed (1864).

=== Royal Mausoleum ===
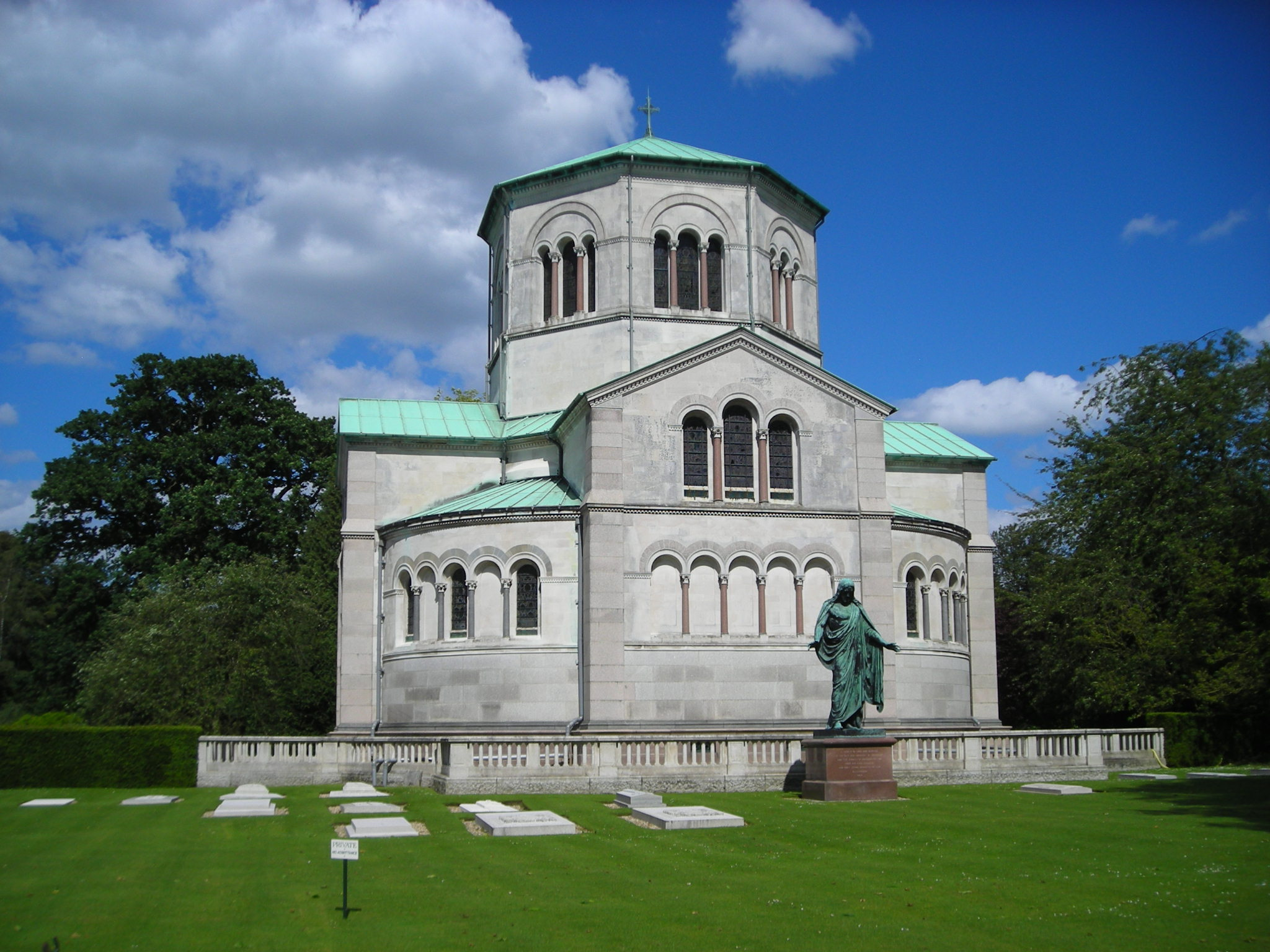
The Royal Mausoleum with the Royal Burial Ground in the foreground

The second mausoleum in the grounds of Frogmore, just a short distance from the Duchess of Kent's Mausoleum, is the much larger Royal Mausoleum, the burial place of Queen Victoria and her consort, Prince Albert. Queen Victoria and her husband had long intended to construct a special resting place for them both, instead of the two of them being buried in one of the traditional resting places of British Royalty, such as Westminster Abbey or St. George's Chapel, Windsor. The mausoleum for the Queen's mother was being constructed at Frogmore in 1861 when Prince Albert died in December of the same year. Within a few days of his death, proposals for the mausoleum were being drawn up by the same designers involved in the Duchess of Kent's Mausoleum: Professor Gruner and A. J. Humbert.

Work commenced in March 1862. The dome was made by October and the building was consecrated in December 1862, although the decoration was not finished until August 1871. The building is in the form of a Greek cross. The exterior was inspired by Italian Romanesque buildings, the walls are of granite and Portland stone and the roof is covered with Australian copper. The internal decoration is in the style of Albert's favourite painter, Raphael, an example of Victoriana at its most opulent. The interior walls are mainly faced in Portuguese red marble, a gift from King Luis I of Portugal, a cousin of both Victoria and Albert, and are inlaid with other marbles from around the world. The monumental tomb itself was designed by Baron Carlo Marochetti. It features recumbent marble effigies of the Queen and Prince Albert. The sarcophagus was made from a single piece of flawless grey Aberdeen granite. The Queen's effigy was made at the same time, but was not put in the mausoleum until after her funeral.

Only Victoria and Albert are interred there, but the mausoleum contains other memorials. Among those is a monument to Princess Alice, Grand Duchess of Hesse-Darmstadt (1843–1878), Victoria's second daughter, who died of diphtheria shortly after her youngest daughter May (1874–1878). In the centre of the chapel is a monument to Edward, Duke of Kent, Victoria's father. He died in 1820 and is buried in St George's Chapel, Windsor.

One of the sculptures is of Queen Victoria and Prince Albert in Saxon Dress, commissioned after Prince Albert's death and executed by William Theed (1804–91). It was unveiled on 20 May 1867 in Windsor Castle, and was moved to the Royal Mausoleum in 1938. The plaster model, which was exhibited in 1868 at the Royal Academy of Arts, is on loan from the Royal Collection to the National Portrait Gallery, London. Queen Victoria recorded in her diary that the idea for it came from Victoria, Princess Royal (her eldest child) and that the inscription on the plinth is a quotation from The Deserted Village by Oliver Goldsmith. The inscription on the plinth alludes to the poet's lament for the passing of the imagined village of 'Sweet Auburn'.

The building has been closed to the public since 2007 because it is structurally unsound. The foundations are waterlogged, and the lower elements of the building are disintegrating. In February 2018, the Royal Household announced it was undertaking repair work on the mausoleum; the work is expected to be complete by 2023.

=== Royal Burial Ground ===
Since its inauguration in 1928, most members of the royal family, except for Kings and Queens, have been interred in the Royal Burial Ground, a cemetery behind Queen Victoria's mausoleum. Among those buried there are Prince Arthur, Duke of Connaught, and Prince Henry, Duke of Gloucester, as well as Prince George, Duke of Kent; the Duke of Windsor, who reigned as King Edward VIII before abdication; and his wife Wallis. Many members of the families of Prince Christian of Schleswig-Holstein and of the Marquess of Cambridge are also buried there. Also in the Burial Ground is the cenotaph of Queen Maria of Yugoslavia, a great-granddaughter of Queen Victoria and wife of King Aleksandar I of Yugoslavia. Having lived in exile in London, she was buried here from 1961 until April 2013, when her remains were exhumed and returned to Oplenac, Serbia.

== The Gothic Ruin, Queen Victoria's Teahouse and the Indian Kiosk ==
Various other structures stand in the grounds including the Gothic Ruin (1793), Queen Victoria's Teahouse (a brick pavilion of 1869) and the Indian Kiosk. Constructed of marble, the kiosk was taken from the Qaisar Bagh in Lucknow following the looting of the city, by the Viceroy of India, Charles Canning, 1st Earl Canning in 1858. The kiosk is octagonal with an onion dome with round arches and deep eaves. It is a Grade II listed structure. Teulon’s Teahouse also has a Grade II listing while James Wyatt’s nearby Gothic Ruin (a folly) is designated Grade II*.

== Public access ==
The house and gardens are usually open to the public on about six days each year, usually around Easter and the August Bank Holiday. The Royal Burial Ground may be viewed from around its perimeter on the days that the gardens are open to the public. The Duchess of Kent's mausoleum may also be viewed externally, but is never open to the public.

== Gallery ==
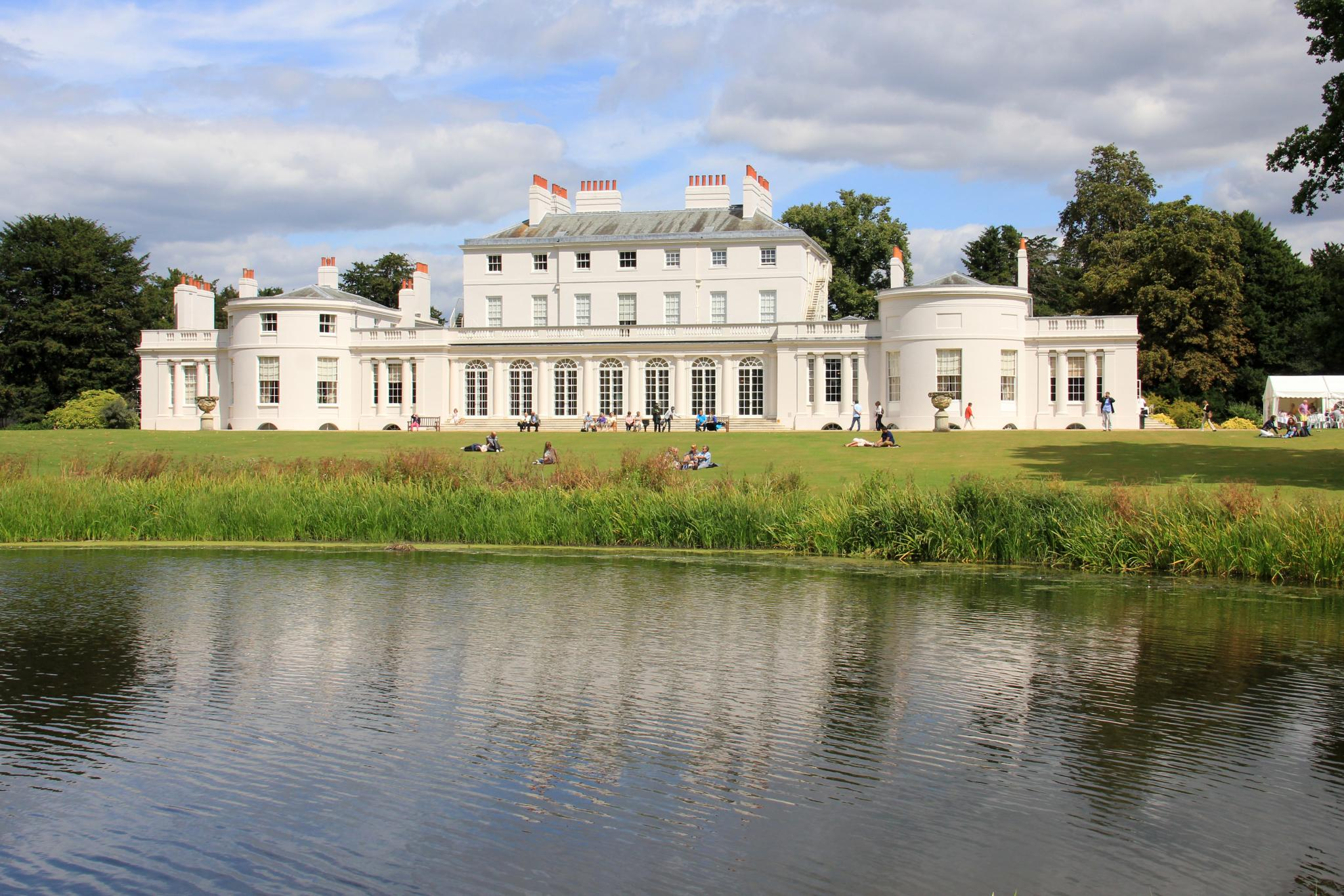
Frogmore House

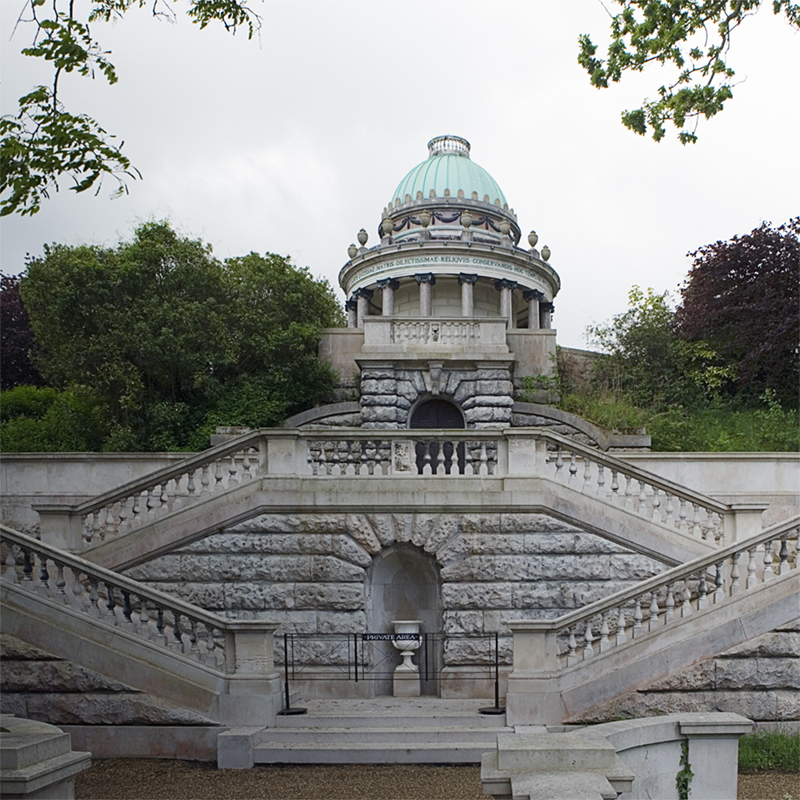
Mausoleum of the Duchess of Kent

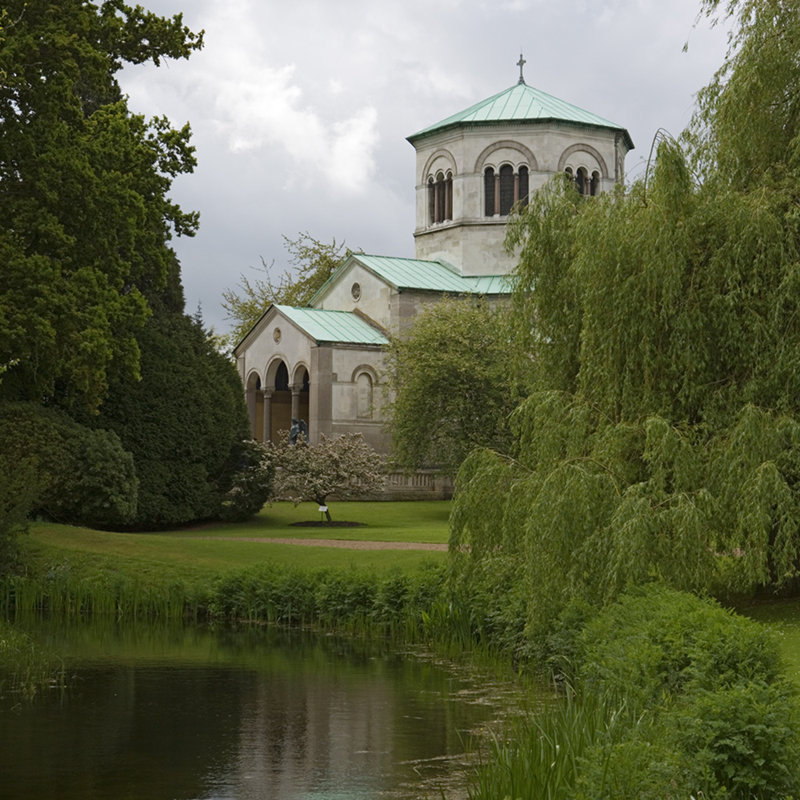
Mausoleum of Queen Victoria & Albert, Prince Consort

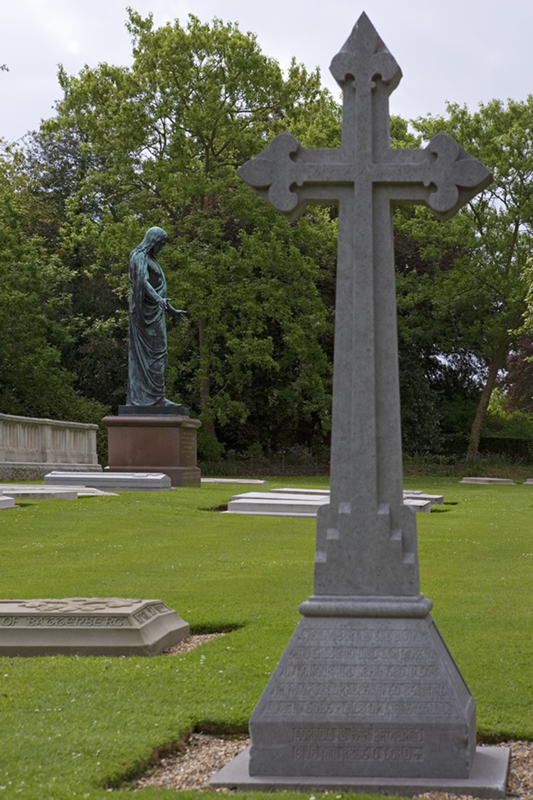
Royal Burial Ground

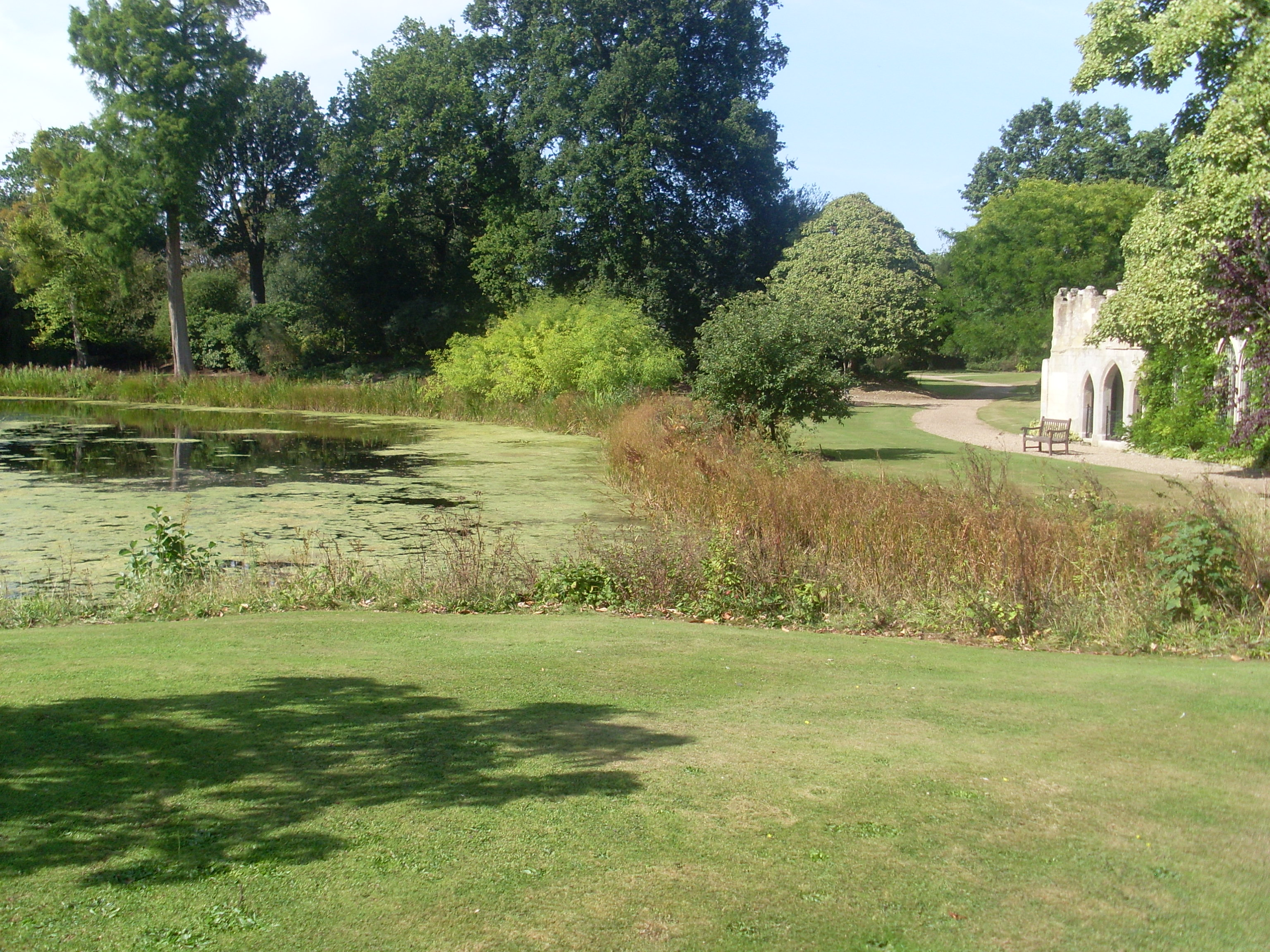
The Gothic Ruin by James Wyatt

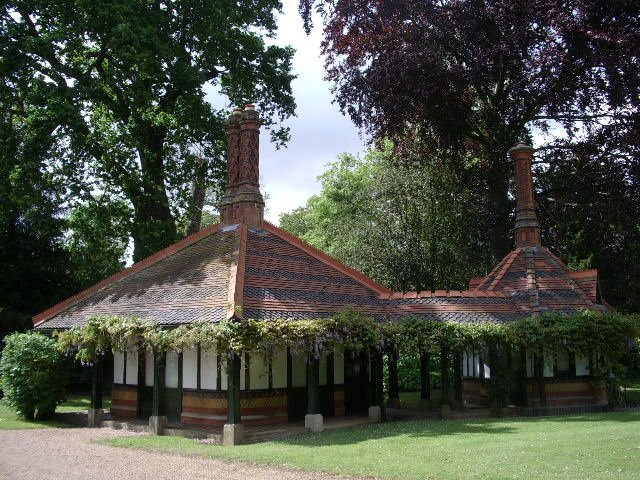
Queen Victoria's Teahouse by Samuel Sanders Teulon

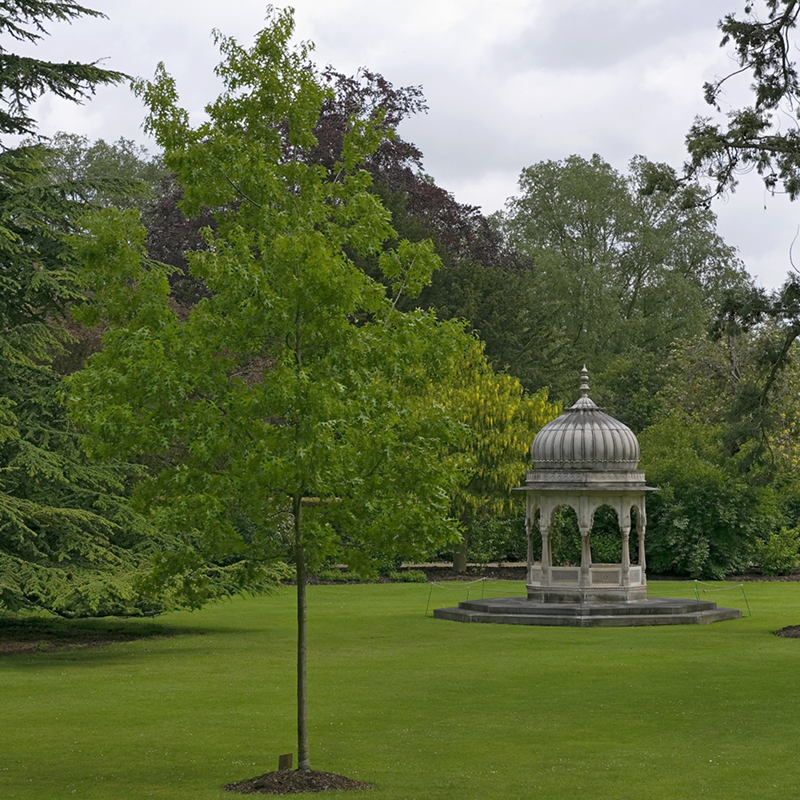
Indian Kiosk commemorating the end of the Indian rebellion of 1857

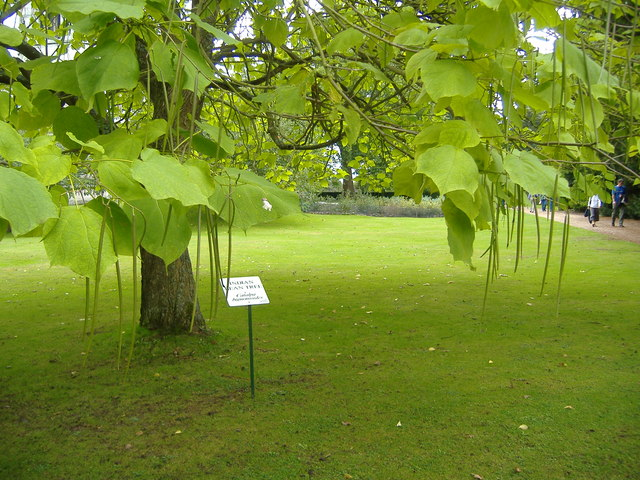
An Indian Bean Tree

== See also ==
- Windsor Great Park
- J. W. Burrow on the use of an image of the sculpture of the Queen and Prince Albert in Saxon dress.

== Sources ==
- St Aubyn, Giles (1991). Queen Victoria: A Portrait. London: Sinclair-Stevenson. ISBN 978-1-856-19086-2. OCLC 636229918.
- Royal Collection Trust (1997). Frogmore House and The Royal Mausoleum. London: Royal Collection. OCLC 57354259.
- Tyack, Geoffrey; Bradley, Simon; Pevsner, Nikolaus (2010). Berkshire. The Buildings Of England. Yale University Press. ISBN 978-0-300-12662-4.
- Plumptre, George (1981). Royal Gardens. London: William Collins, Sons. ISBN 978-0-002-11871-2. OCLC 833434627.
