= A. J. Humbert =

British architect

Albert Jenkins Humbert ("A. J. Humbert") (1821–1877) was a British architect particularly favoured by Prince Albert.

Amongst the buildings he is particularly associated with are Sandringham House and St. Mildred's Church, Whippingham and both the Duchess of Kent's Mausoleum and the Royal Mausoleum at Frogmore, within the Home Park of Windsor Castle.
