= Frogmore House =

Grade I listed historic house museum in Windsor, United Kingdom

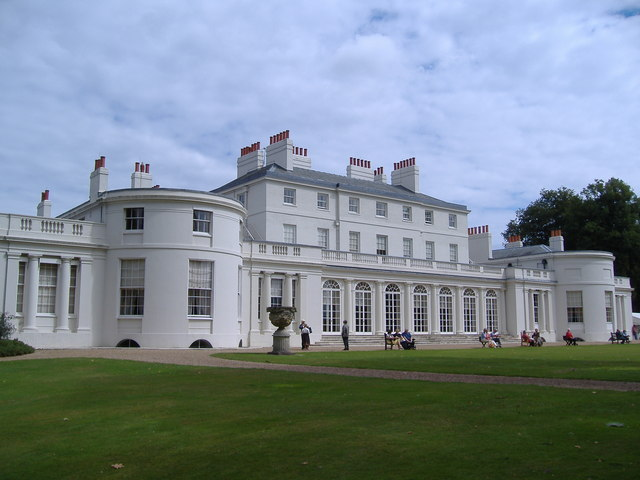
- Frogmore House in 2006

- Location within Berkshire

General information
- Location: Frogmore, Home Park, Windsor, Berkshire, England
- Coordinates: 51°28′27″N 0°35′39″W
- Completed: 1684
- Client: Anne Aldworth and Thomas May

Design and construction
- Architect: Attributed to Hugh May

Listed Building – Grade I
- Official name: Frogmore House
- Designated: 2 October 1975
- Reference no.: 1319304

Frogmore House is a 17th-century English country house owned by the Crown Estate. It is a historic Grade I listed building. The house is located on the Frogmore estate, which is situated within the grounds of the Home Park in Windsor, Berkshire. Half a mile south of Windsor Castle, Frogmore was let to a number of tenants until the late 18th century, when it was used intermittently as a residence for several members of the British royal family.

Queen Charlotte spent much time on the estate, and it was later the home of Queen Victoria's mother, the Duchess of Kent and Strathern (whose large mausoleum is in a part of the estate's 33 acre gardens). Although occasionally used as a retreat into the early 20th century, the house has been largely unoccupied since 1872. Queen Mary often stayed there early in her marriage and for the rest of her life in the 20th century took a special interest in furnishing the house with family mementos. Keepsakes from the royal yacht HMY Britannia following its decommissioning were placed there in the late 20th century by Prince Philip, Duke of Edinburgh. In the 21st century, it is used by the royal family to host both private and official events.

== History ==
=== Early tenants ===
The Frogmore estate has been under royal ownership since the 16th century and was then leased to a series of Crown tenants. Construction on Frogmore House was not begun until 1680 for tenants Anne Aldworth and Thomas May. Work continued until 1684 and is thought to be the work of Hugh May, an architect employed by Charles II at Windsor Castle and uncle of tenant Thomas May.

The house's first royal resident was George FitzRoy, 1st Duke of Northumberland, the illegitimate son of Charles II and Barbara Palmer, 1st Duchess of Cleveland. The Duke died in 1716, but his wife continued to live at Frogmore until her death in 1738. There were a number of successive tenants, including Edward Walpole, until 1792 when George III purchased the house for his wife, Queen Charlotte.

=== Royal retreat ===
Queen Charlotte used the house as a country retreat for herself and her unmarried daughters. They used Frogmore as a "refuge" away from court life where they could practise their pastimes of "painting, drawing, needlework, japanning, reading and 'botanising'". The Queen's interest in botany is reflected in a number of the rooms at Frogmore, including a room decorated with painted flowers by the artist Mary Moser. Great attention was paid to the gardens, where the queen planted a number of Spanish chestnut, laburnum and birch trees and installed a number of follies.

The house was in good condition, but to make it fit for royal inhabitants, James Wyatt was employed to enlarge and modernise Frogmore House. Between 1795 and 1804, Wyatt enlarged the second floor, added flanking pavilions to the north and south of the house and extended to make room for a new dining room and library. As part of developing Frogmore gardens, Queen Charlotte had built a simpler retreat house in 1801, now known as Frogmore Cottage. When Charlotte died in 1818, she left the house to her daughter Princess Augusta Sophia, who lived there until her death in 1840.

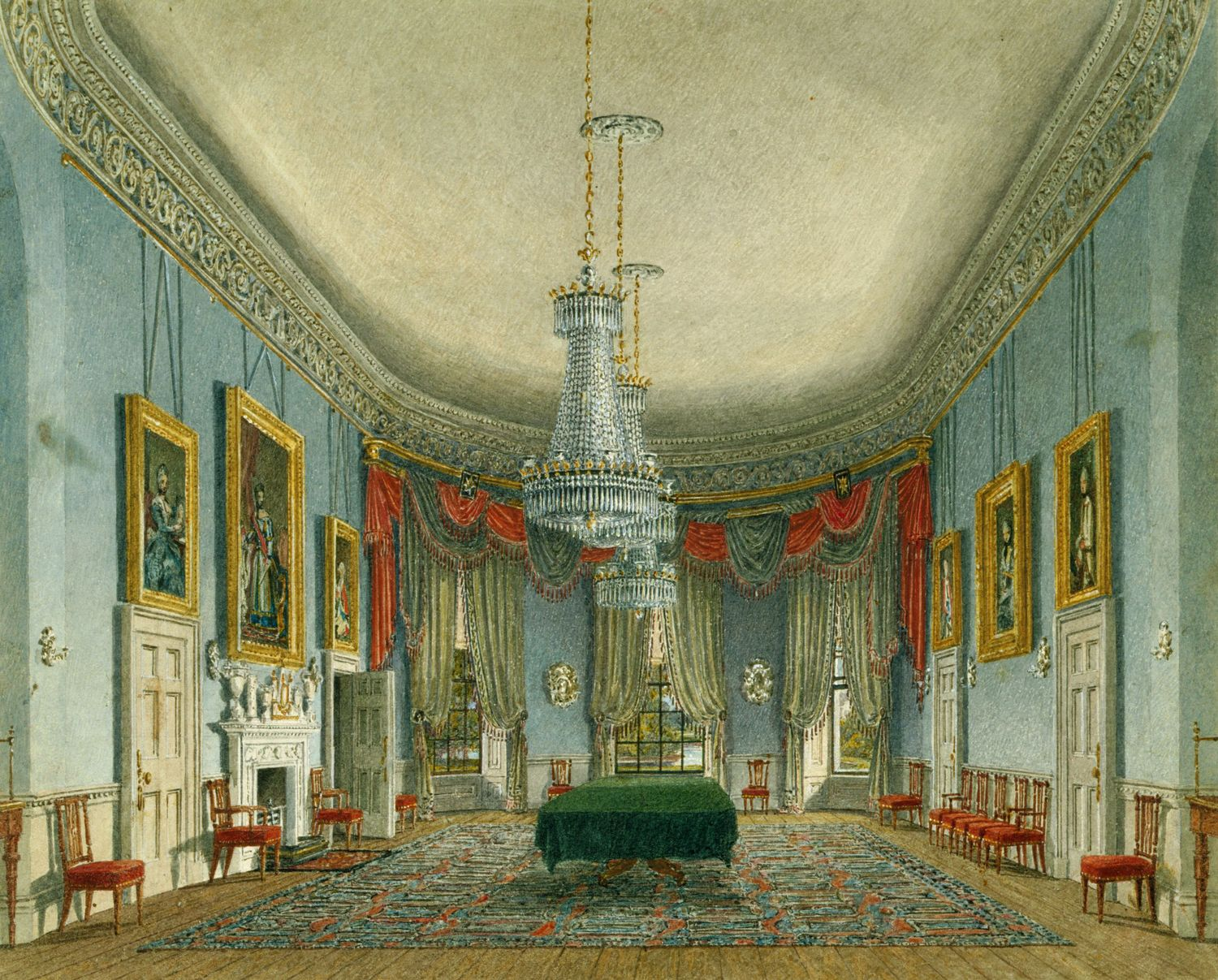
The Dining Room, 1819

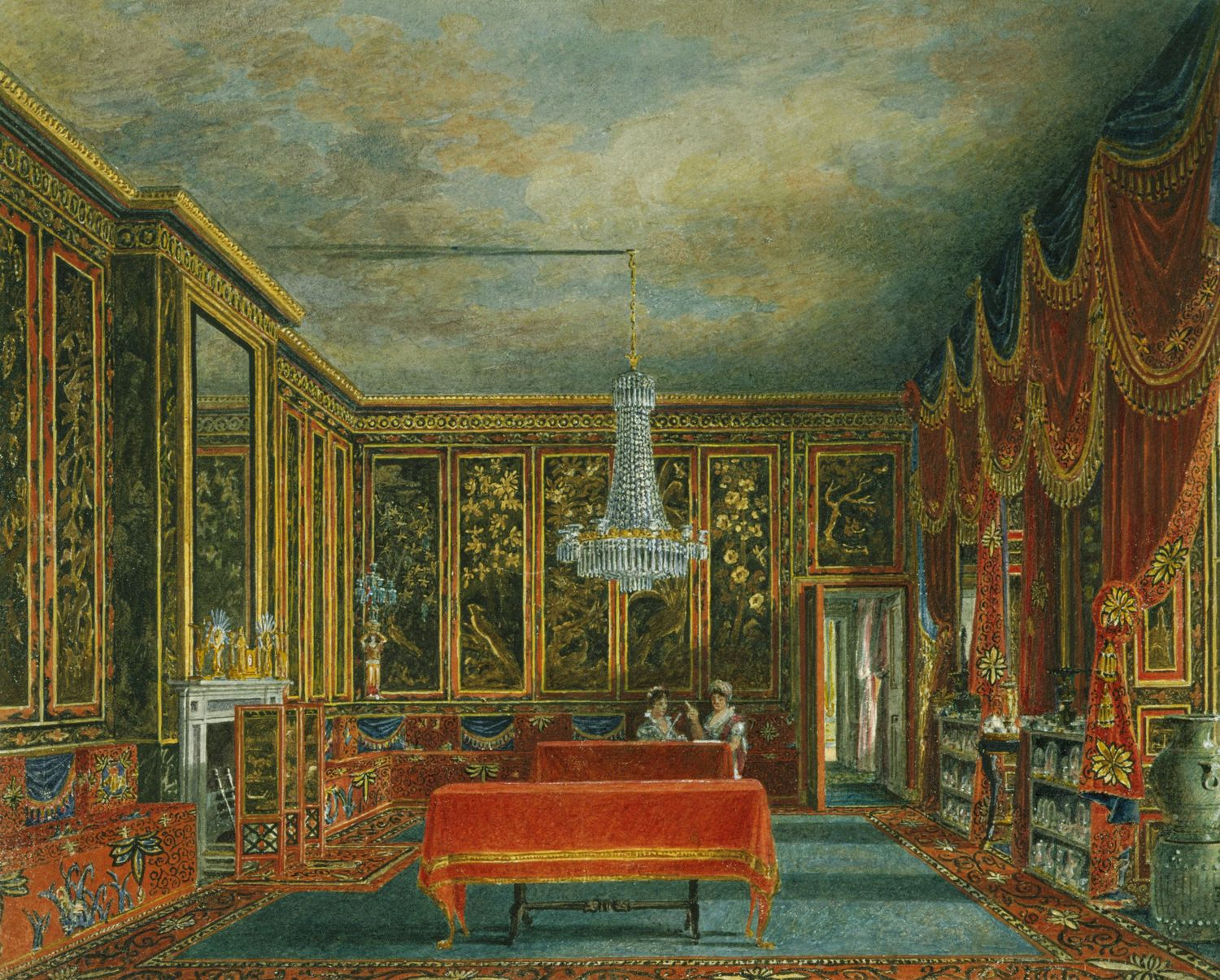
The Japan Room, 1819

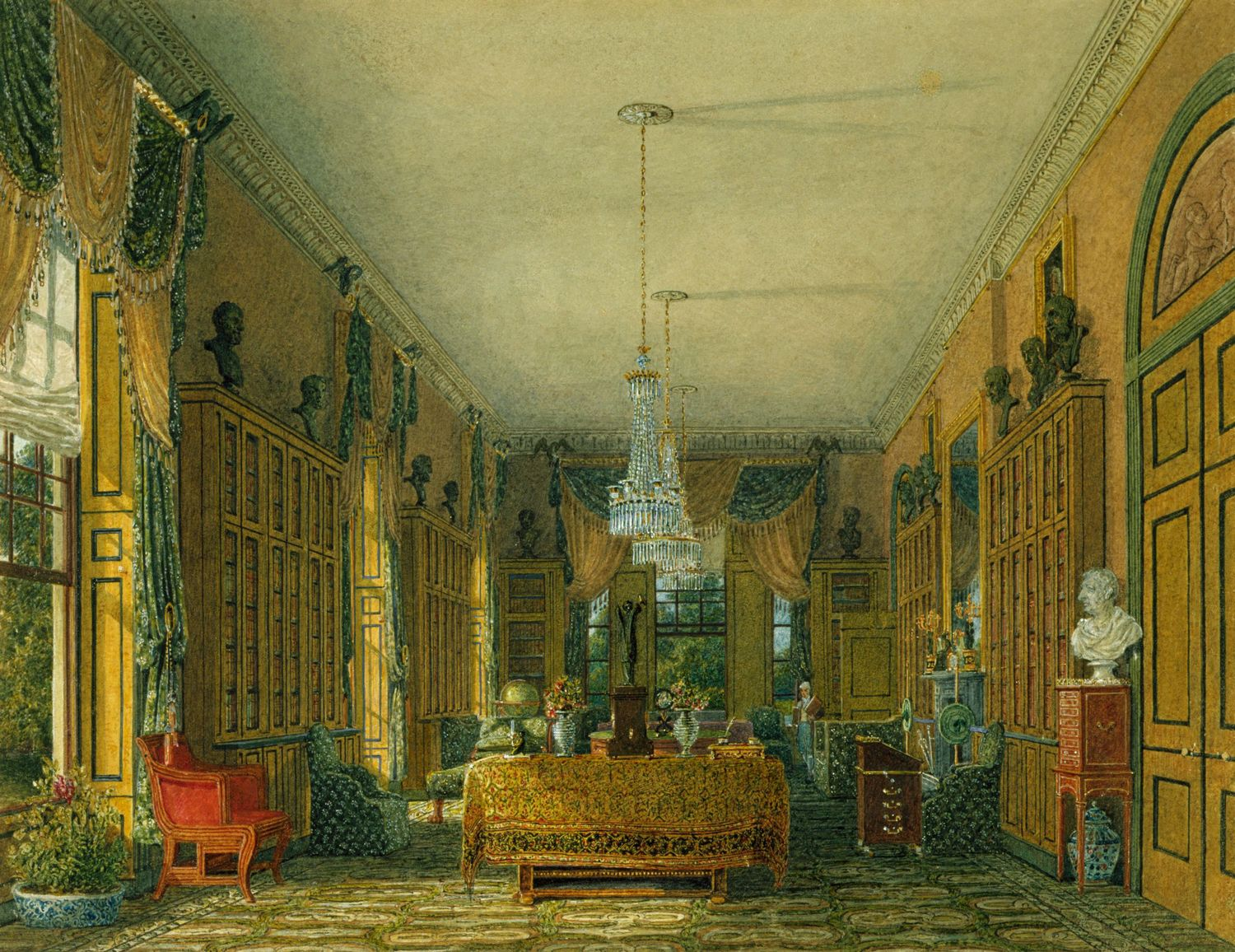
The Queen's Library, 1817

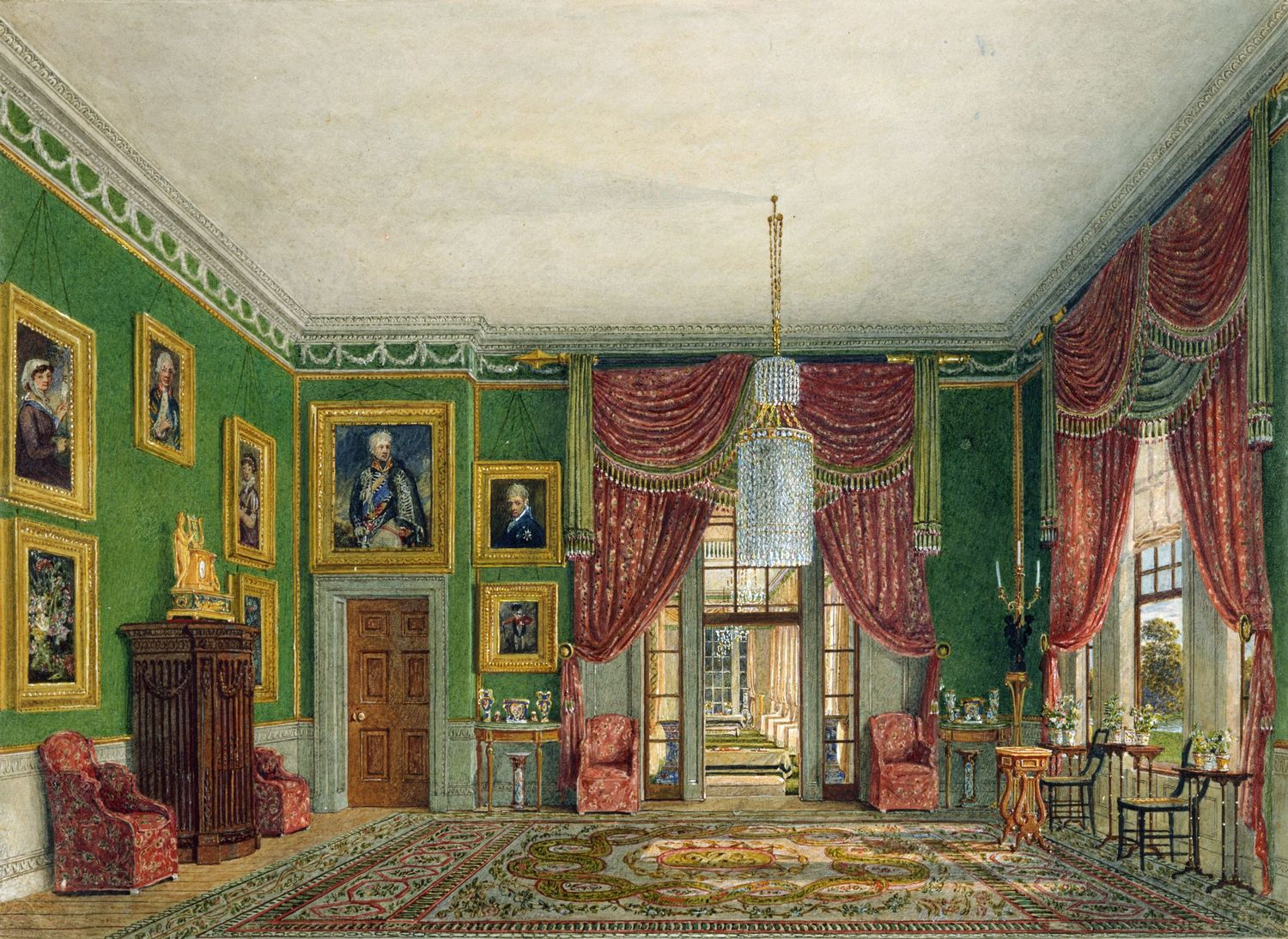
The Green Pavilion, 1817

Following Augusta Sophia's death, Queen Victoria gave Frogmore to her mother, the Duchess of Kent. During this time, the house was subject to a number of alterations. The Duchess's taste differed greatly from Queen Charlotte's and much of the decoration from her time was lost. The house was used regularly between 1841 and the death of the Duchess of Kent in 1861, with Queen Victoria often visiting and a number of private family functions being held there. Victoria wrote of the house: "All is peace and quiet and you only hear the hum of the bees, the singing of the birds and the occasional crowing and cackling from the Poultry Yard!"

=== Recent history ===
Frogmore was used intermittently for the remainder of the 19th century. Princess Alexandra (then Princess of Wales) gave birth to her first child (Prince Albert Victor) at the house in 1864, after which it was the home of Princess Helena, third daughter of Queen Victoria, and her husband Prince Christian of Schleswig-Holstein. Helena and her husband moved to Cumberland Lodge in 1872. Queen Victoria's great-grandson Louis Mountbatten was born on the estate in 1900. From 1902 to 1910, the Prince and Princess of Wales (later King George V and Queen Mary) were frequent residents. From 1925 until her death in 1953, Mary collected and arranged in the house souvenirs of the royal family, describing it as "a 'family' souvenir museum as well as a museum of 'bygones' and of interesting odds and ends."

During this time, George V allowed his first cousin Grand Duchess Xenia Alexandrovna of Russia to live at Frogmore Cottage by 1925 after she escaped the Russian February Revolution. Xenia was "very grateful" that her cousin let her stay at Frogmore. By March 1937, Xenia had moved from Frogmore Cottage to Wilderness House in the grounds of Hampton Court Palace. Since 1928, most members of the royal family, except for sovereigns and their consorts, have been interred at the Royal Burial Ground, on the Frogmore Estate.

In 1997, following the decommissioning of the Royal Yacht Britannia, Prince Philip, Duke of Edinburgh, furnished what had previously been Queen Charlotte's library and the Duchess of York's dining room with a selection of items from the vessel. This included a mahogany table constructed for Britannia c. 1950.

The house continued to be used by the royal family for entertaining and it was used as a venue for the wedding reception after the marriage of the Queen's grandson, Peter Phillips, to Autumn Kelly in May 2008. It was also used for the reception after the marriage of Prince Harry and Meghan Markle in May 2018, and for the wedding of Lady Gabriella Windsor with Thomas Kingston in May 2019.

== Restoration ==
During the 1980s, the house underwent extensive restoration, revealing the lost early 18th-century wall paintings by Louis Laguerre. Work was also done on the Green Pavilion, in an effort to restore it to its appearance during the occupation of Queen Charlotte. Work was done on the cornice, dado and chimneypiece, which retain Wyatt's "characteristically crisp detailing." The restorations cost a total of £2.5 million by the time they were completed in 1990.

== See also ==
- Royal Burial Ground, Frogmore
- Royal Mausoleum, Frogmore
- Frogmore Cottage
