= Royal Mausoleum, Frogmore =

The Royal Mausoleum
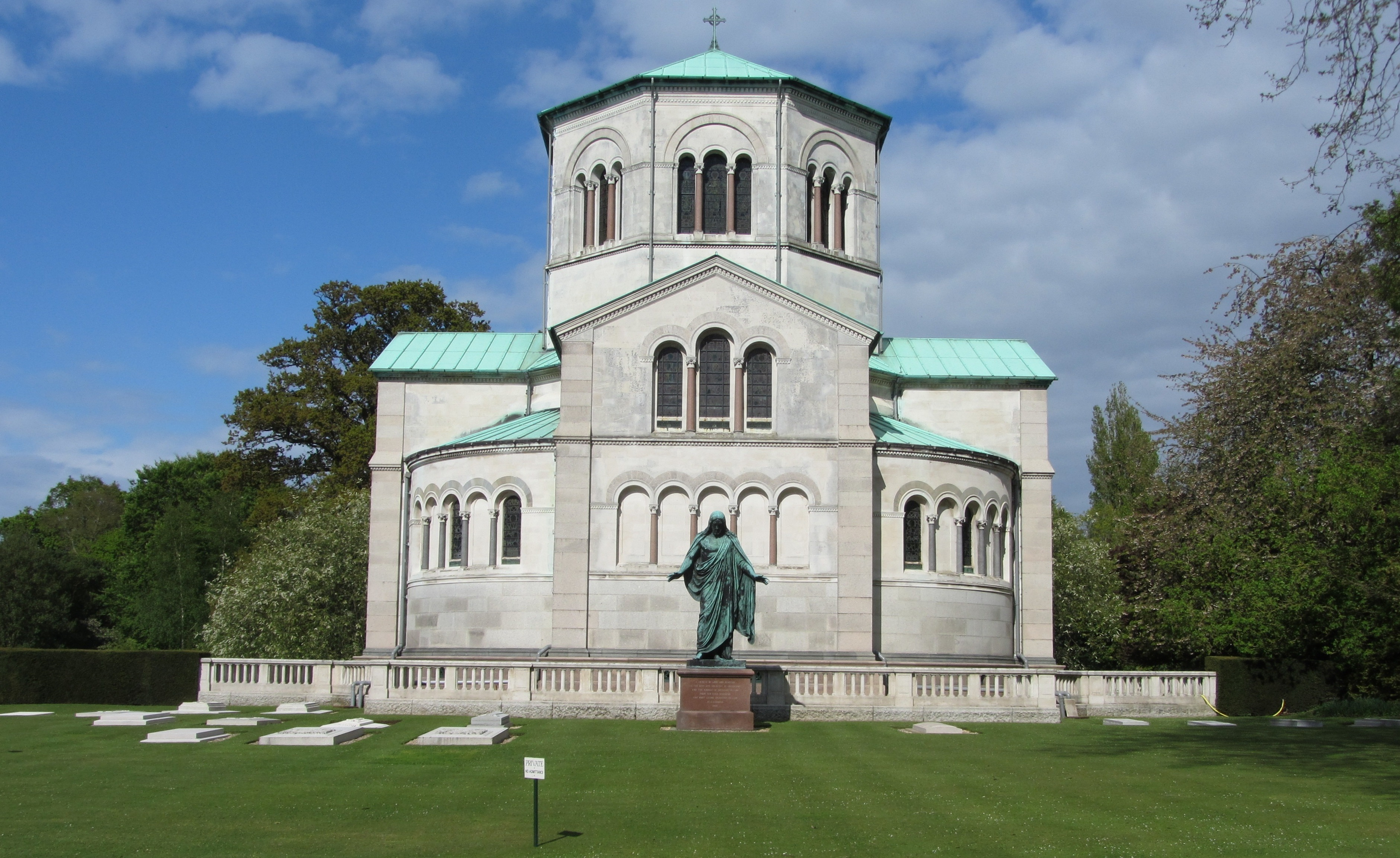
- The Royal Mausoleum in 2015

- Location within Berkshire
- 51°28′26″N 0°35′54″W
- Location: Frogmore, Home Park, Windsor, Berkshire, England

History
- Built: 1862 to 1871

Site notes
- Architect(s): Ludwig Gruner; A. J. Humbert
- Architectural style: Neo-Romanesque
- Governing body: Crown Estate

Listed Building – Grade I
- Official name: Royal Mausoleum
- Designated: 2 October 1975
- Reference no.: 1117780

The Royal Mausoleum is a mausoleum for Queen Victoria and her husband Prince Albert. It is located on the Frogmore estate within the Home Park at Windsor in Berkshire, England. It was listed Grade I on the National Heritage List for England in October 1975. Built between 1862 and 1871, Albert, who died in 1861, was interred in the mausoleum in 1871 following its completion. Victoria was interred on 4 February 1901 following her death in late January.

Work commenced in March 1862. The dome was made by October and the building was consecrated in December 1862, although the decoration was not finished until August 1871.

== History ==
Queen Victoria and Prince Albert had long intended to construct a special final resting place for them both, instead of the two of them being buried in one of the traditional resting places of British royalty, such as Westminster Abbey or St George's Chapel, Windsor. The mausoleum for the Queen's mother was being constructed at Frogmore in 1861 when Albert died in December of the same year. Victoria chose the site of Albert's mausoleum on 18 December 1861, four days after her husband's death, and plans were drawn up by Ludwig Gruner and A. J. Humbert, who had previously designed the Duchess of Kent's Mausoleum. Excavation work started on the site of the mausoleum on 27 January 1862, the final plans having been approved by Victoria that day. Victoria had had previous meetings with Humbert and Gruner to finalise and approve their designs.

The foundation stone was laid by Victoria on 15 March 1862. It had been intended by Victoria to lay the stone on the first anniversary of her mother the Duchess of Kent's death, but it was laid the day before the anniversary as it occurred on a Sunday. Victoria was accompanied by many of her children and many members of staff in attendance to the royal household for the ceremony of laying the foundation stone. The total cost of the construction and decoration of the mausoleum was £200,000 (equivalent to £19,600,000 in 2025), and was entirely funded by Victoria and Edward, Prince of Wales from their private funds. Nikolaus Pevsner's Buildings of England series describes the mausoleum as the "finest piece of Victorian funerary architecture in Britain". Though Victoria and Albert are the only interments in the chapel, the mausoleum also contains monuments to Princess Alice, Grand Duchess of Hesse-Darmstadt (1843–1878), Victoria's second daughter, who died of diphtheria shortly after her youngest daughter May (1874–1878). In the centre of the chapel is a monument to Edward, Duke of Kent, Victoria's father. He died in 1820 and is buried in St George's Chapel, Windsor.

One of the sculptures is of Queen Victoria and Prince Albert in Saxon dress, commissioned after Prince Albert's death and executed by William Theed (1804–91). It was unveiled on 20 May 1867 in Windsor Castle, and was moved to the Royal Mausoleum in 1938. The plaster model, which was exhibited in 1868 at the Royal Academy of Arts, is on loan from the Royal Collection to the National Portrait Gallery, London. Victoria wrote in her diary that the idea for it came from Victoria, Princess Royal (her eldest child), and that the inscription on the plinth is a quotation from The Deserted Village by Oliver Goldsmith. The inscription on the plinth alludes to the poet's lament for the passing of the imagined village of 'Sweet Auburn'.

== Design ==
The mausoleum was built by the architect A. J. Humbert, based on designs by Professor Ludwig Gruner. It is in the form of a Greek cross, with a 70 ft diameter, and a central octagon of height 70 ft. It was designed in the Romanesque style. The mausoleum is built from Portland stone and granite; Australian copper covers the roof.

A Latin inscription in bronze above the door can be translated:

That part of Prince Albert which was mortal
the mourning Widow Queen Victoria willed to be buried in this Tomb, the Year of our Lord 1862
Farewell, thou most desired! here at the last I shall rest with thee
I shall rise up with thee in Christ

Antonio Salviati designed and created the elaborate mosaics in the porch of the mausoleum, at a quoted cost of £480. Salviati created mosaics of differing quality according to their proximity to the intended viewer; the low ceiling of the porch was not properly appreciated by Salviati's craftsmen in Venice, and they were dissatisfied with the final result. This dissatisfaction endangered his proposed designs for the future Albert Memorial, and he offered to rectify the work at his own expense. The interior is richly decorated in the High Renaissance style reminiscent of Raphael, whom Albert described as "the greatest artist of all time". Gruner was responsible for the decoration of the interior. The walls of the interior are laid with Portuguese red marble, a gift from King Luis I of Portugal, a cousin of both Victoria and Albert, and are inlaid with other marbles from around the world, with a dado of Sienese marble. Three chapels in the mausoleum are decorated with painting depicting

- the nativity of Jesus in the South chapel
- the crucifixion of Jesus in the North chapel
- Jesus's resurrection in the West chapel.

An altar was placed in the north chapel. Paintings of the four evangelists decorate the spandrels of the central octagon. Statues of the four evangelists stand in the niches of the pendatives. Artists involved in the decoration of the interior included the German painters Julius Frank and Karl Pfänder, the Italian Nicola Consoni and the German sculptors Heinrich Baumer, Hermann Hultzsch, Gustav Kunz and Friedrich Rentsch. The painting on the entrance transept is the work of Victoria, Princess Royal, Queen Victoria's eldest daughter.

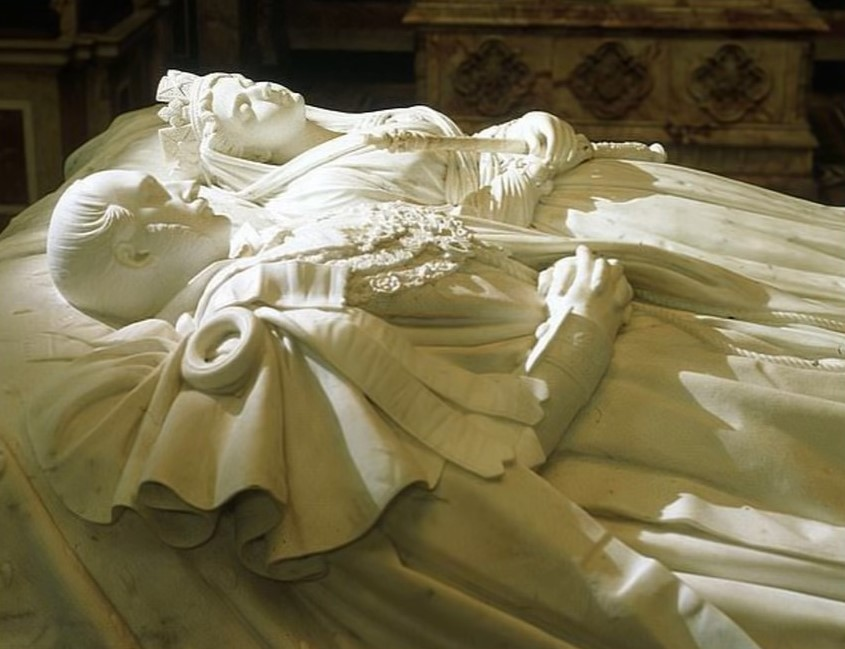
Tomb of Victoria and Albert

The centrepiece of the mausoleum is the sarcophagus containing the remains of Victoria and Albert. The couple are each depicted in recumbent effigies in marble sculpted by the Italian sculptor Carlo Marochetti. The effigy of Albert was the last work completed before Marochetti's death. Albert is depicted in his Field marshal uniform wearing his Order of the Garter. The effigy of Victoria was completed at the same time, and kept in storage until her death. It was mined from the Cairngail quarry in Longside, Aberdeenshire. The block was the fourth block mined; the previous three having been rejected due to flaws. The block of granite measured 10 ft × 8 ft × 4 ft and weighed more than 33 tonnes, but weighed 18 tonnes after being fashioned into a sarcophagus. The lid for the sarcophagus weighed 4.5 to 5 tonnes. The colour of the granite has been variously described as dark grey or blue. The sarcophagus rests on a block of black Belgian marble which had been promised to the royal family by King Leopold I of Belgium and given to the mausoleum by King Leopold II following his father Leopold's death in 1865. Angels kneeling in prayer stand at each corner of the sarcophagus. The angels were sculpted in bronze by Marochetti and cast by the Parisian foundry of Ferdinand Barbedienne. The angels were removed for the interment ceremony of Victoria.

The latter and wing windows of the royal mausoleum were originally decorated with patterned glass and the armorial crests of the Saxe-Coburg family. Each window featured an angel playing a musical instrument. The stained glass was renewed under the direction of Edward VII in the early 20th century, and the cupola was repainted at the same time.

== Restoration ==
External videos
- Restoring Frogmore (2018) – a series of videos about the restoration at the Royal Family YouTube channel

The building has been closed to the public since 2007, when it was found to be structurally unsound. Due to the marshy nature of the land, the foundations were generally waterlogged, and the lower elements of the building were disintegrating. It was reported in August 2011 that repairs might not be completed for a further ten years.

In February 2018, the Royal Household announced it was undertaking repair work, expected to be finished by 2023. This was begun in June 2018, with the aims of creating a dry moat around the building and of replacing its roof, protecting it from the long-standing problem of water ingress.

== Depiction in art ==
In 1869, the architectural illustrator Henry William Brewer undertook a commission from Queen Victoria to complete a series of paintings of the Mausoleum. The Queen took a great interest in watching Brewer at work, and herself appears in some of these intensely personal pictures. The paintings are now held by the Royal Collection Trust.

== See also ==
- William Theed#Double portrait, Queen Victoria and Prince Albert
