= Duchess of Kent's Mausoleum =

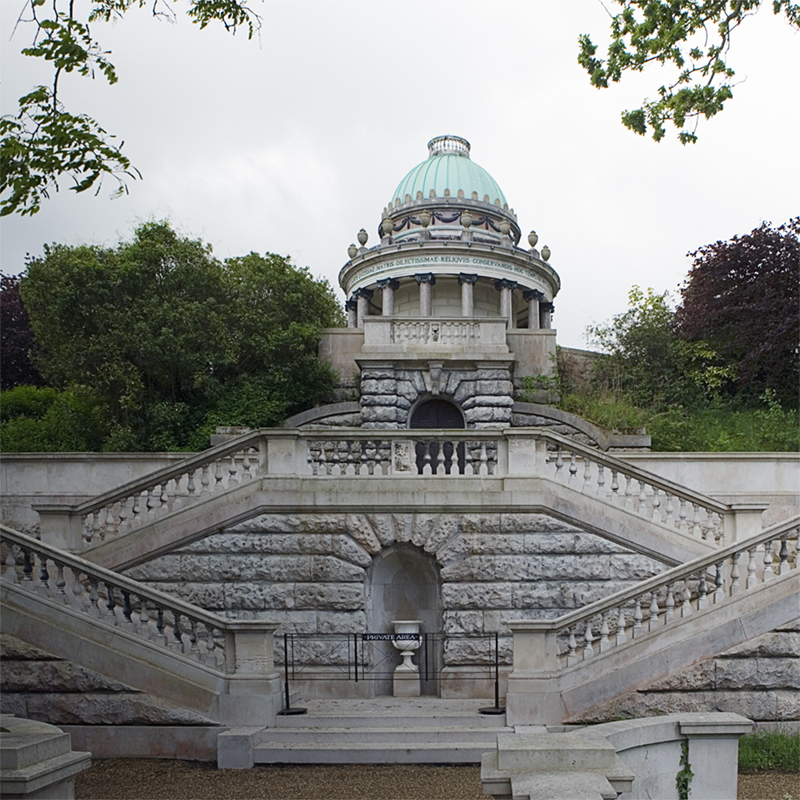
- The Duchess of Kent's Mausoleum in 2006

- Location within Berkshire
- 51°28′26″N 0°35′48″W
- Location: Frogmore, Windsor Home Park, Surrey, England

History
- Built: 1861

Site notes
- Architect: A. J. Humbert
- Architectural style: Neoclassical
- Governing body: Crown Estate

Listed Building – Grade I
- Official name: Duchess of Kent's Mausoleum
- Designated: 2 October 1975
- Reference no.: 1117780

The Duchess of Kent's Mausoleum is a mausoleum for Victoria of Saxe-Coburg-Saalfeld, Duchess of Kent, the mother of Queen Victoria. It is situated in Frogmore Gardens in the Home Park, Windsor. It was listed Grade I on the National Heritage List for England in October 1975. The bridge leading to the island from the mausoleum is listed Grade II.

The Duchess spent the last years of her life at Frogmore House and the top part of the structure was originally intended as a summer house, with the lower level of the structure to be the site of her interment. The Duchess had originally expressed a desire to be buried in the mausoleum of her brother, Ernest I, Duke of Saxe-Coburg and Gotha, in the now Bavarian town of Coburg. The Duchess died at Frogmore House on 16 March 1861 before the summer-house was completed so the upper chamber became part of the mausoleum and now contains a statue of the Duchess by William Theed completed in 1864. It was completed in July 1861 following the Duchess's death in March. The Duchess's body lay at St George's Chapel in Windsor before being interred in the mausoleum in a granite sarcophagus in August 1861.

The mausoleum was consecrated in July 1861 by Samuel Wilberforce, the Bishop of Oxford, assisted by the Rev Gerald Wellesley, the Dean of Windsor, the Rev Charles Leslie Courtenay, the Canon of Windsor, the Rev J. St. John Blunt, Chaplain to Albert, Prince Consort, and the Vicar of Old Windsor, the Rev H. J. Ellison, Chaplain at Windsor Castle and Vicar of New Windsor, and the Rev Charles Loyd, the Vicar of Great Hampden.

== Design ==
It was built by the architect A. J. Humbert, based on designs by Professor Ludwig Gruner. Humbert had come to Victoria's attention after his successful redesign of St Mildred's Church, Whippingham, the parish church near Osborne House on the Isle of Wight. The design of the Duchess of Kent's Mausoleum was inspired by The Mausoleum, Castle Howard by Nicholas Hawksmoor in Yorkshire and by Donato Bramante's Tempietto of San Pietro in the Roman district of Montorio. The Historic England listing describes the style of the mausoleum as "Heavy late French neo-classical.” It is made from Portland stone with a ribbed dome in copper surmounted by a balustrade. The rotunda structure is surrounded by 16 Ionic 10 ft tall columns, made from Cornish granite from Penryn with bronze capitals and bases. The main approach to the mausoleum faces a bridge over a lake with a double flight of balustraded steps. The mausoleum is decorated with heraldic painting by Gruner. The ceiling is decorated by a blue glass dome ornamented with stars.

The mausoleum was built by Messrs I'Anson of Cirencester Place, with the bronze casting supplied by Messrs Robinson and Co. of Pimlico.
