= Home Park, Windsor =

Royal Park in Southern England

Coordinates: 51.485°N 0.595°W

Home Park
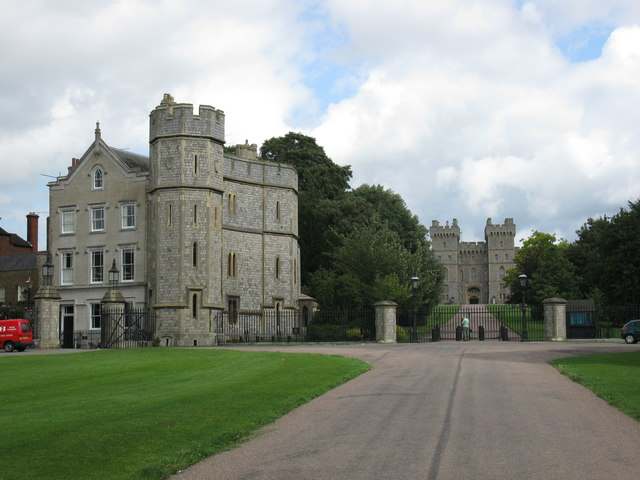
- Gatehouse and gated entrance to the Home Park. The gate cuts across the Long Walk. The castle is visible in the distance
- Interactive map of Home Park
- Type: Private
- Location: Windsor, Berkshire, England
- Area: 655 acres (265 ha)
- Created: 1368
- Owner: Crown Estate

National Register of Historic Parks and Gardens
- Official name: The Royal Estate, Windsor: Windsor Castle and Home Park
- Designated: 31 August 1999
- Reference no.: 1001434

The Home Park, previously known as the Little Park (and originally Lydecroft Park), is a 2.65 km^{2} royal park which forms the private grounds of Windsor Castle in Berkshire, England. It lies mainly on the eastern side of the castle and is administered by the Crown Estate of the United Kingdom. The park includes the Frogmore estate, and several private organisations related to the estate have facilities in the park. To the Home Park's south is the Windsor Great Park, largely open to the public.

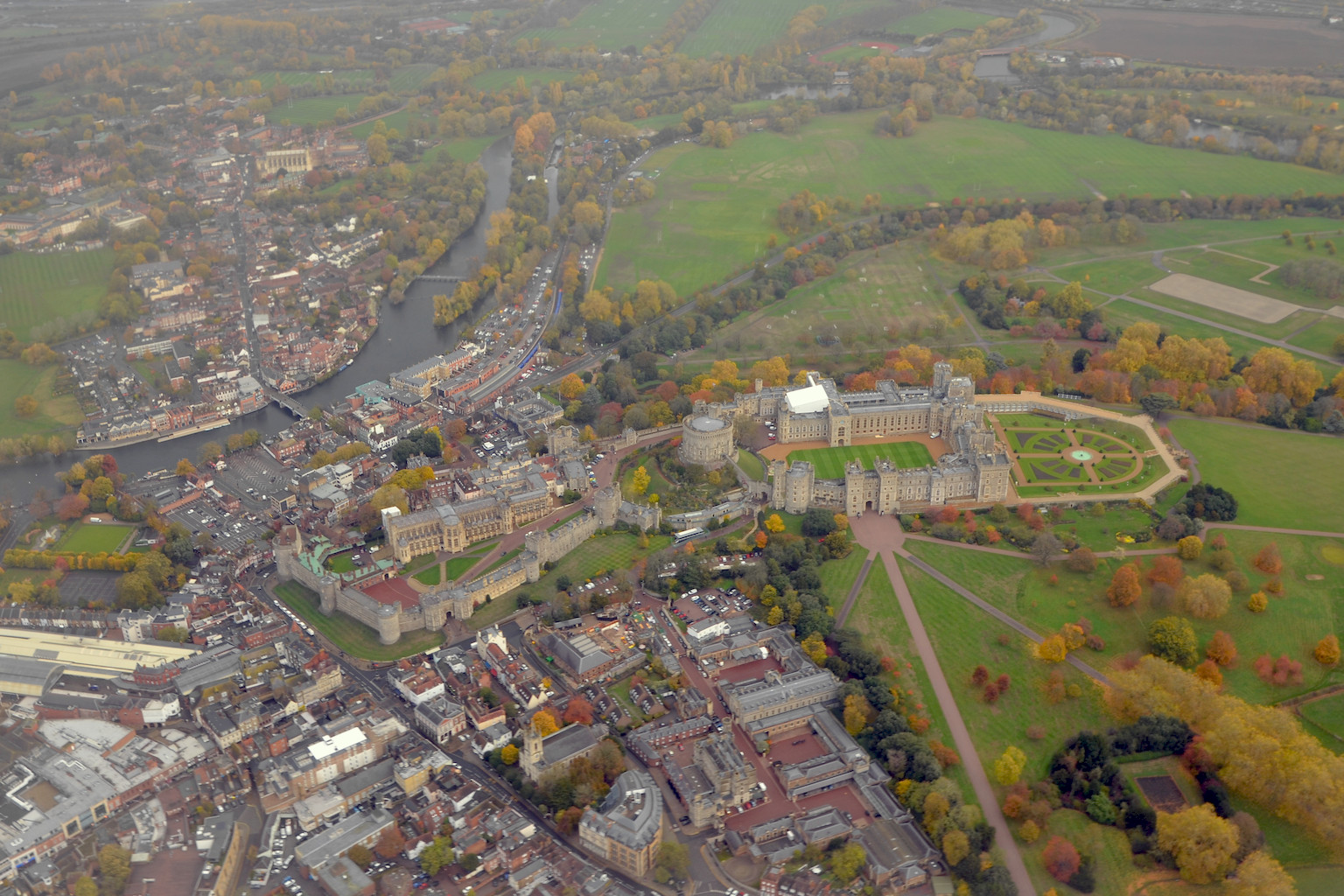
This aerial view of the northwest corner of the Home Park includes Windsor Castle. The Long Walk to and from the castle is the wide path, Frogmore Drive is the tree-lined path.

Home Park is listed Grade I on the Register of Historic Parks and Gardens of Historic England.

== Features ==
The Home Park is divided from the main Windsor Great Park by the Albert Road (A308) towards Old Windsor. It is the private estate of Windsor Castle. As well as parkland, gardens and avenues of fine trees, it contains farmland (cattle grazing and winter feed), a golf course, a bowling green (for the Royal Household Bowling Club), a cricket field (for the Royal Household Cricket Club), tennis courts (Windsor Home Park Lawn Tennis Club), the playing fields of St George's School, Adelaide Cottage (on the site of the old Keeper's Lodge) and the Frogmore Estate, including Frogmore House, and gardens with Frogmore Cottage and a large lake, the Royal Mausoleum and the Royal Burial Ground. Also attached are Shaw Farm, the former Prince Consort's Home Farm and the Windsor Farm Shop. The grave of Dash, the favourite spaniel of Queen Victoria, can be found on the grounds.

== History ==
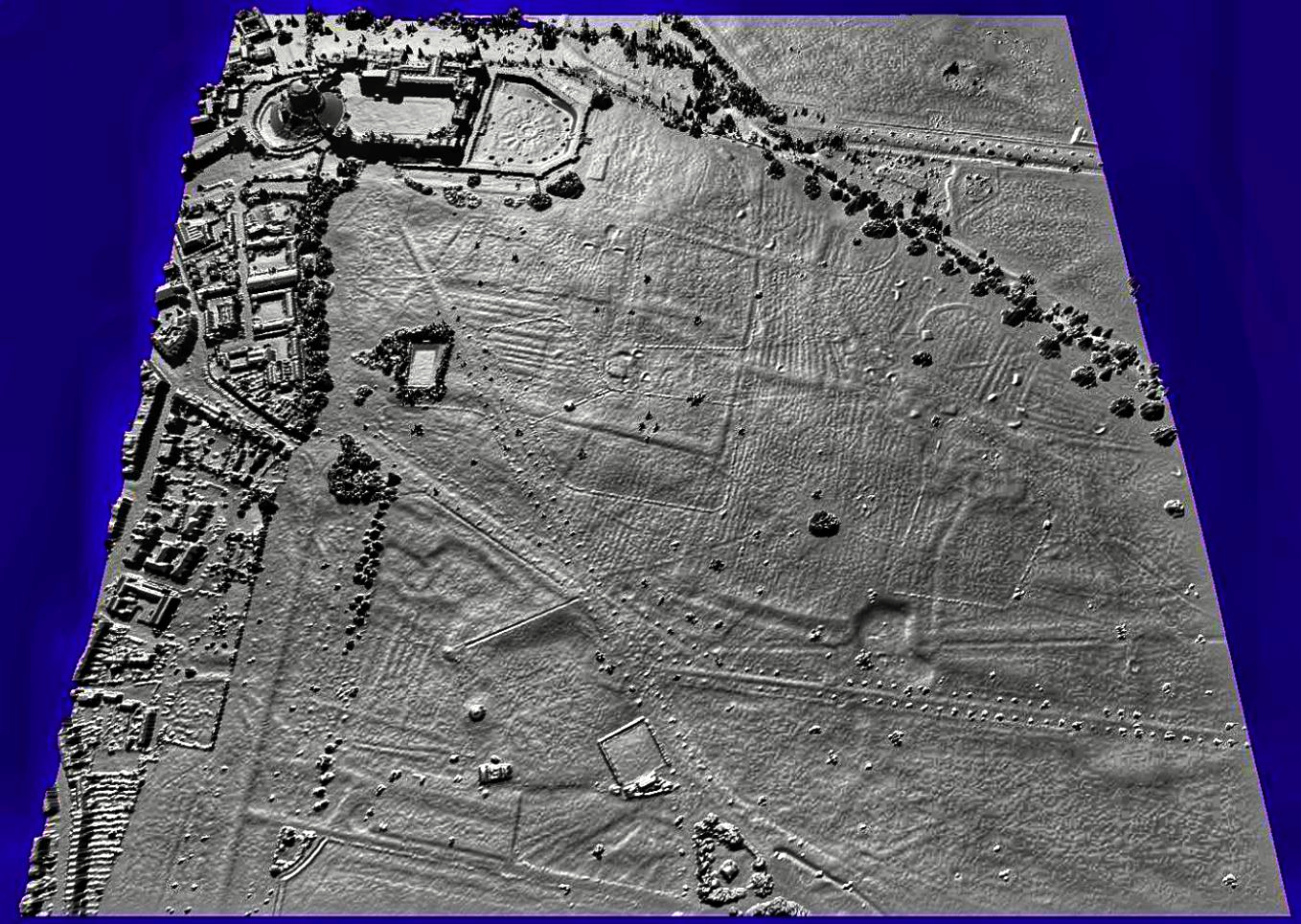
An oblique lidar view of Windsor Castle and Home Park

Originally in the manor of Orton and not a royal possession, part of the area was first emparked (for deer hunting) by King Edward III in 1368 and expansion continued over many centuries. Areas of the Home Park are mentioned in Shakespeare's Merry Wives of Windsor and show that the main road to Datchet then ran through it. The famous Herne's Oak stood nearby. Oliver Cromwell trained his New Model Army in the park. George III removed the deer in 1785.

The modern boundaries of the park were set by the Windsor Improvement Act 1846 and the Windsor Castle Act 1848, when the road to Datchet through the park was closed and public access denied.

Frogmore House and gardens alone are open to the general public on a few specific days in the spring and summer. The Royal Windsor Horse Show and the Windsor Rose Show also take place within the park.
