= Ephraim Gottlieb Krüger =

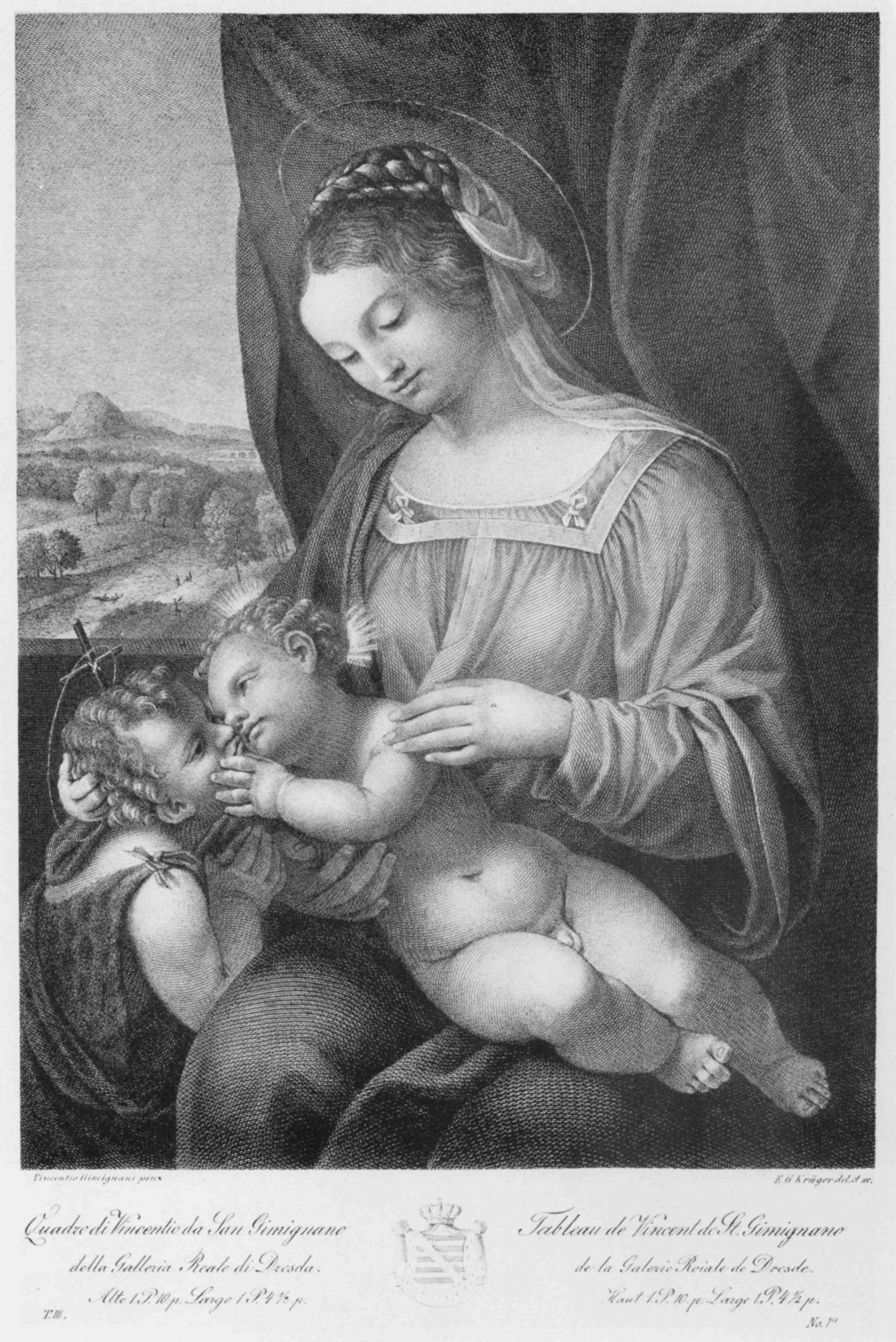
Engraving by Ephraim Gottlieb Krüger of Lorenzo Lotto's 1518 Madonna and Child with the Infant St John the Baptist.

Ephraim Gottlieb Krüger (20 July 1756 - 9 January 1834) was an engraver from the Electorate (late Kingdom) of Saxony in Germany who was also notable as a professor at the Dresdner Kunstakademie.

== Life ==
He was born in Dresden to a family which had produced artists since the 18th century. When he was eleven, he began his training at the Dresdner Kunstakademie, which had been founded a few years earlier. The first director of the Kunstakademie, Charles Hutin, taught him drawing, as did the Italian painter and draftsman Giovanni Battista Casanova, co-founder and director of the Kunstakademie from 1776, and Johann Eleazar Zeissig, known as Schenau. He learned engraving from the Italian Giuseppe Camerata (1718–1803), miniaturist and engraver for the Saxon court, then a professor at the Kunstakademie. His talent earned him an academic pension in 1789 and then became an associate member (1803) and associate professor (1815) of the Dresdner Akademie. He was also a member of Zum goldenen Apfel, a Masonic lodge in Dresden.

Following the development of copperplate engraving in the 19th century, Krüger's engravings combined large etched areas with post-processing with a burin. His work was popular and he contributed illustrations to several contemporary books. His engravings can be found in August Gottlieb Meißners Skizzen, a collection of 50 stories of crime, and the frontispiece engraving for the historical novel Alcibiades based on a drawing by his teacher Schenau. He also provided illustrations for Friedrich Christian Schlenkert's novels and for Kaspar Friedrich Lossius's Moralische Bilderbibel. and the Historischen Bildersaal. His prints also appeared in Briefe über die Kunst an eine Freundinn by Joseph Friedrich zu Racknitz and Georg Joachim Göschen's edition of the works of Christoph Martin Wieland in 1794–1802. Wilhelm Gottlieb Becker's Augusteum on the ancient monuments of Dresden contained 28 of Krüger's images of the cast collection Anton Raphael Mengs had created for teaching purposes, which Elector Frederick Augustus I had acquired from his estate in 1782. His engravings were also appreciated abroad and he received commissions from the publishers Louis Robillard-Péronville and Pierre Laurent for large-scale panel works for the Louvre.

== Bibliography (in German) ==
- Carl Clauß (1883). "Krüger" . Allgemeine Deutsche Biographie (in German). Vol. 17. Leipzig: Duncker & Humblot. pp. 223–224.
- Georg Kaspar Nagler: Neues allgemeines Künstler-Lexicon oder Nachrichten aus dem Leben und den Werken der Maler, Bildhauer, Baumeister, Kupferstecher, Formschneider, Lithographen, Zeichner, Medailleure, Elfenbeinarbeiter, etc. Band 7. Fleischmann, München 1839, S. 179 f. (Digitalisat)
- Friedrich August Schmidt, Bernhard Friedrich Voigt: Neuer Nekrolog der Deutschen. Band 12, Teil 1. Voigt, Weimar 1836, S. 19–21 (Google Books).

== External links (in German) ==
- Works by and about Ephraim Gottlieb Krüger in the Deutsche Digitale Bibliothek (German Digital Library)
- Works by Ephraim Gottlieb Krüger in the Staatliche Kunstsammlungen Dresden
- Works by Ephraim Gottlieb Krüger in the Digitaler Portraitindex
- Works by Ephraim Gottlieb Krüger in the Deutsche Fotothek
- Works by Ephraim Gottlieb Krüger in the Virtual Prints and Drawings Collection of the Herzog August Bibliothek and the Herzog Anton Ulrich-Museum
