= Ludwig Gruner =

German engraver, architect and art historian (1801–1882)

Wilhelm Heinrich Ludwig Gruner (24 February 1801 - 27 February 1882) was a German artist, engraver, architect and art historian, who also served as director of the Kupferstich-Kabinett, Dresden. His art historical writings were mostly dominated by his admiration of Raphael and the Italian Renaissance.

== Life ==
Born in Dresden, he initially wanted to become a decorative painter, a plan scotched in the mid-1840s by an eye problem. He began his studies in 1815 under Klinger before enrolling at the Dresden Academy under Ephraim Gottlieb Krüger. Patrons then funded a move to the academy in Milan in 1825, where he studied under Giuseppe Longhi and Pietro Anderloni, and a journey through southern France and Spain in 1828, including three months studying the Escorial. Returning to Germany in 1832, he completed an engraving of the portrait of Anton Raphael Mengs before a journey to England and Scotland, where he saw a number of Madonnas after Raphael and at Blenheim Palace The Exposition of Moses.

From 1836 to 1843 he returned to Italy, this time staying in Rome, making engravings using the techniques of the 16th-century engraver Marcantonio Raimondi and publishing sets of engravings after Raphael's works in the dome of the Chigi Chapel at Santa Maria del Popolo and after the ceiling frescoes in the Stanza di Eliodoro at the Vatican. He returned to England in 1842 to make drawings from the Raphael Cartoons and found favour with Prince Albert and Queen Victoria. He worked for Albert from 1841 to 1855 and was appointed Victoria's art advisor and dealer in 1845, helping acquire around sixty paintings and sculptures for the Royal Collection and leading on the decoration of Osborne House and Buckingham Palace. He collaborated with Elmslie William Dallas on the decoration of the garden pavilion at Buckingham Palace in 1841.

From 1845 to 1848 he lived in Rome again before being appointed director of the Kupferstich-Kabinett in Dresden on 2 July 1858, also receiving a professorship at the academy there (Ernst Mohn was one of his students) and becoming a member of the gallery commission. He began buying valuable Spanish paintings for its collection in London as early as 1863 - they had originated in the collection of Louis Philippe I of France. He travelled to London almost every summer, working for the Arundel Society, decorating the ceiling of the Blue Room in Windsor Castle after Albert's death there in 1861 and collaborating with A. J. Humbert to design both the Duchess of Kent's Mausoleum (1860) and the Royal Mausoleum, Frogmore (1862) Excavation work started on the site of the mausoleum on 27 January 1862, the final plans having been approved by Victoria that day. Victoria had had previous meetings with Humbert and Gruner to finalise and approve their designs for Frogmore. Gruner himself died in Dresden.

== Selected artworks ==
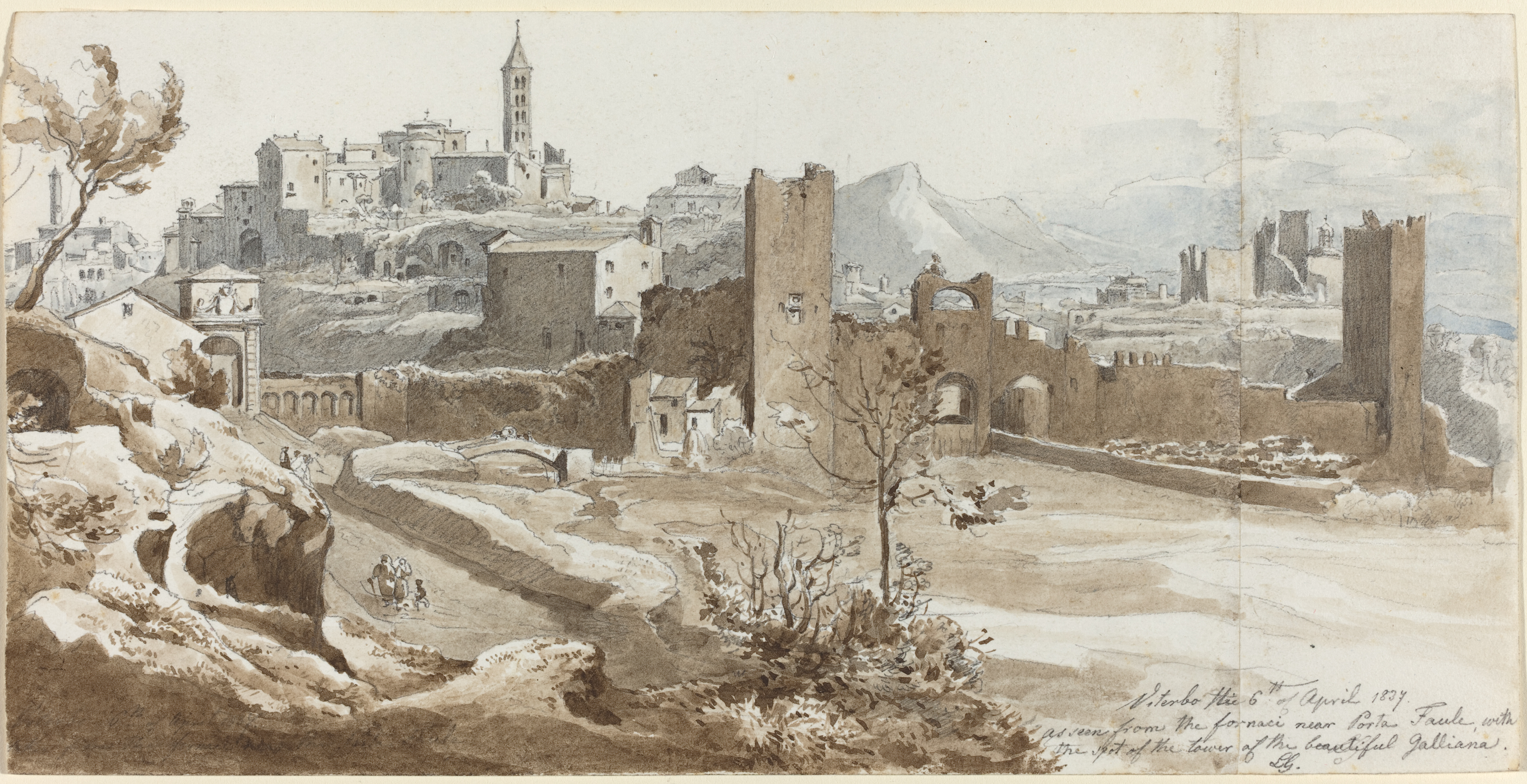
Wilhelm Heinrich Ludwig Gruner, Viterbo, 1837

- Portrait of Giulio de Medici
- Moses after Esteban Murillo
- Christ Blessing after Raphael's work in the collection of Count P. Tosio in Brescia
- Engraving after Vision of a Knight by Raphael in the National Gallery, London
- Christ on the Mount of Olives after a work then thought to be by Raphael but now probably attributed to Lo Spagna in the National Gallery, London
- Saint Laurence Giving Alms in the Fiesole Chapel in the Vatican
- Caryatids by Raphael in the Vatican (Raffael-Karyatiden aus dem Vatikan) 1852 (15 leaves)

== Selected writings ==
- The decorations of the garden pavilion in the grounds of Buckingham Palace. London 1846, doi:10.11588/diglit.33817.
- Specimens of ornamental art selected from the best models of the classical epochs. 1850
- Fresco decorations and stuccoes of churches & palaces in Italy during the fifteenth & sixteenth centuries with descriptions. Thomas Mc Lean, London 1854 (englisch, Ludwig Gruner is available for free viewing and download at the Internet Archive).
- Adolf Gutbier, Wilhelm Lübke: Rafael-Werk: sämmtliche Tafelbilder und Fresken des Meisters in Nachbildungen nach Kupferstichen und Photographien. Adolf Gutbier, Dresden 1875 (Mit Stichen von Gruner, Ludwig Gruner is available for free viewing and download at the Internet Archive).

As director of the Königlichen Kupferstichkabinett he also published:

- Die Basreliefs an der Vorderseite des Doms von Orvieto, Marmor-Bildwerke der Schule der Pisaner. Leipzig 1858 (Text von Braun);
- „Lo Scaffale“, or presses in the sacristy of the church of Sta Maria delle Grazie at Milano. Illustrations of the painted decorations by Bernardino Luini. London 1859–1860.
- Verzeichniss der im Königlichen Museum zu Dresden aufgestellten Original-Zeichnungen alter und neuer Meister. C. C. Meinhold & Söhne, Dresden 1862 (books.google.de).
- The Green Vaults Dresden, illustrations of the choicests works in that museum of art. C. C. Weinhold and sons, Dresden 1862 (Ludwig Gruner is available for free viewing and download at the Internet Archive).
- The Terracotta architecture of North Italy: (XIIth-XV centuries); pourtrayed as examples for imitation in other countries; from careful drawings and restorations. John Murray, London 1867 (Ludwig Gruner is available for free viewing and download at the Internet Archive).
