= Blue Room (Windsor Castle) =

Room in Windsor Castle

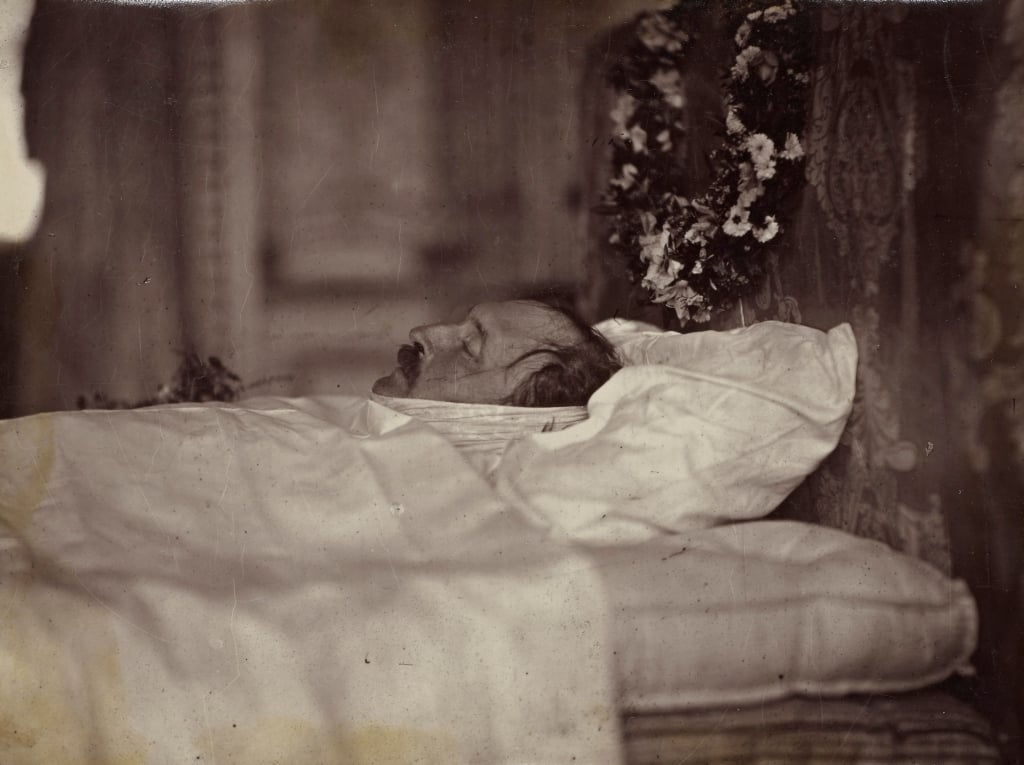
Prince Albert in his deathbed in the Blue Room, December 1861

The Blue Room is a room at Windsor Castle that was the site of the death of kings George IV in 1830 and William IV in 1837 and Albert, Prince Consort in 1861. The room was formerly the Royal Bedchamber during the reign of George IV. It is situated in Windsor Castle's east wing on the first floor in the castle's private apartments. The name of the room derives from the blue upholstering that covers the walls. It is sometimes known as the 'Albert Room'.

Albert, Prince Consort, the husband of Queen Victoria, died in the Blue Room on 14 December 1861. He had asked to be moved to the room because of the strong light from its tall windows. In the aftermath of his death Victoria decreed that the room should "be kept in its present state" and "not made use of in the future". Victoria described the preservation of the room as not a "Sterbe-Zimmer [death room] – but as a living beautiful monument". For the next 40 years from Albert's death until her own in 1901, the Blue Room was maintained as if Albert were still alive. A jug of hot water was delivered as it was when he was alive and needed to shave, and fresh clothes were laid out on the bed. The unused chamber pot was also removed and cleaned. A bust of Albert by the sculptor William Theed was placed between the beds in the room with a memorial wreath, and copious flowers decorated the room.

Victoria had the ceiling of the room decorated by Ludwig Gruner following Albert's death and an 1863 painting of Albert in armour by Edward Henry Corbould was hung in the room, it was later displayed in Albert's waiting room.

The room was depicted by William Corden the Younger (son of William Corden the Elder) in an 1868 watercolour commissioned by Victoria that is now part of the Royal Collection.

The Blue Room, as part of the private apartments of Windsor Castle, is not open to the public.
