= Friedrich August Schmidt (lexicographer) =

German lexicographer (1785–1858)

Georg Friedrich August Schmidt (13 April 1785, in Weimar – 16 January 1858, in Ilmenau) was a German theologian, lexicographer, and bibliographer, best remembered for publishing thirty volumes of the Neuer Nekrolog der Deutschen (New Necrology of the Germans), most notably published by Bernhard Friedrich Voigt.
