= Prince Albert of Saxe-Coburg and Gotha =

Consort of Queen Victoria from 1840 to 1861

Albert of Saxe-Coburg and Gotha
- Prince Consort
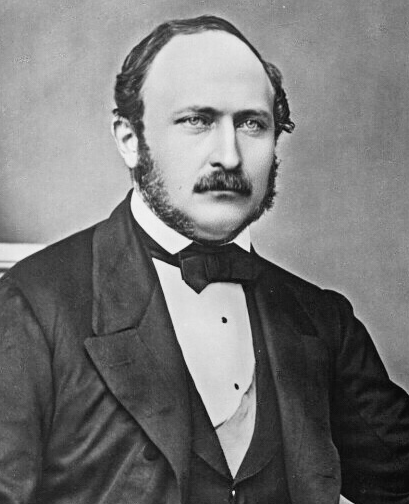
- Albert in 1861

Consort of the British monarch
- Tenure: 10 February 1840 – 14 December 1861
- Born: Prince Albert of Saxe-Coburg-Saalfeld; 26 August 1819; Schloss Rosenau, Saxe-Coburg-Saalfeld
- Died: 14 December 1861 (aged 42); Windsor Castle, England
- Burial: 23 December 1861; Royal Vault, St George's Chapel; 18 December 1862; Royal Mausoleum, Frogmore
- Spouse: Queen Victoria (m. 1840)
- Issue: Victoria, Princess Royal; Edward VII; Alice, Grand Duchess of Hesse and by Rhine; Alfred, Duke of Saxe-Coburg and Gotha; Helena, Princess Christian of Schleswig-Holstein; Princess Louise, Duchess of Argyll; Prince Arthur, Duke of Connaught and Strathearn; Prince Leopold, Duke of Albany; Beatrice, Princess Henry of Battenberg
Names
- Franz August Karl Albert Emanuel
- House: Saxe-Coburg-Saalfeld (until 1826); Saxe-Coburg and Gotha (from 1826)
- Father: Ernest I, Duke of Saxe-Coburg and Gotha
- Mother: Princess Louise of Saxe-Gotha-Altenburg

Prince Albert of Saxe-Coburg and Gotha (Franz August Karl Albert Emanuel; 26 August 1819 – 14 December 1861) was the husband of Queen Victoria and consort of the British monarch from their marriage on 10 February 1840 until his death in 1861. Victoria granted him the title Prince Consort in 1857.

Albert was born in the Saxon duchy of Saxe-Coburg-Saalfeld to a family connected to many of Europe's ruling monarchs. At the age of 20, he married Victoria, his first cousin, with whom he had nine children. Initially, he felt constrained by his role as consort, which did not afford him power or responsibilities. He gradually developed a reputation for supporting public causes, such as educational reform and the abolition of slavery worldwide, and was entrusted with running the Queen's household, office and estates. He was heavily involved with the organisation of the Great Exhibition of 1851, which was a resounding success.

Victoria came to depend more and more on Albert's support and guidance. He aided the development of Britain's constitutional monarchy by persuading his wife to be less partisan in her dealings with the British parliament, but he actively disagreed with the interventionist foreign policy pursued during Lord Palmerston's tenure as Foreign Secretary. Albert died in 1861 at the age of 42, devastating Victoria so much that she entered into a deep state of mourning and wore black for the rest of her life. On the day of her death in 1901, their eldest son succeeded as Edward VII, the first British monarch of the House of Saxe-Coburg and Gotha, named after the ducal house to which Albert belonged.

== Early life ==
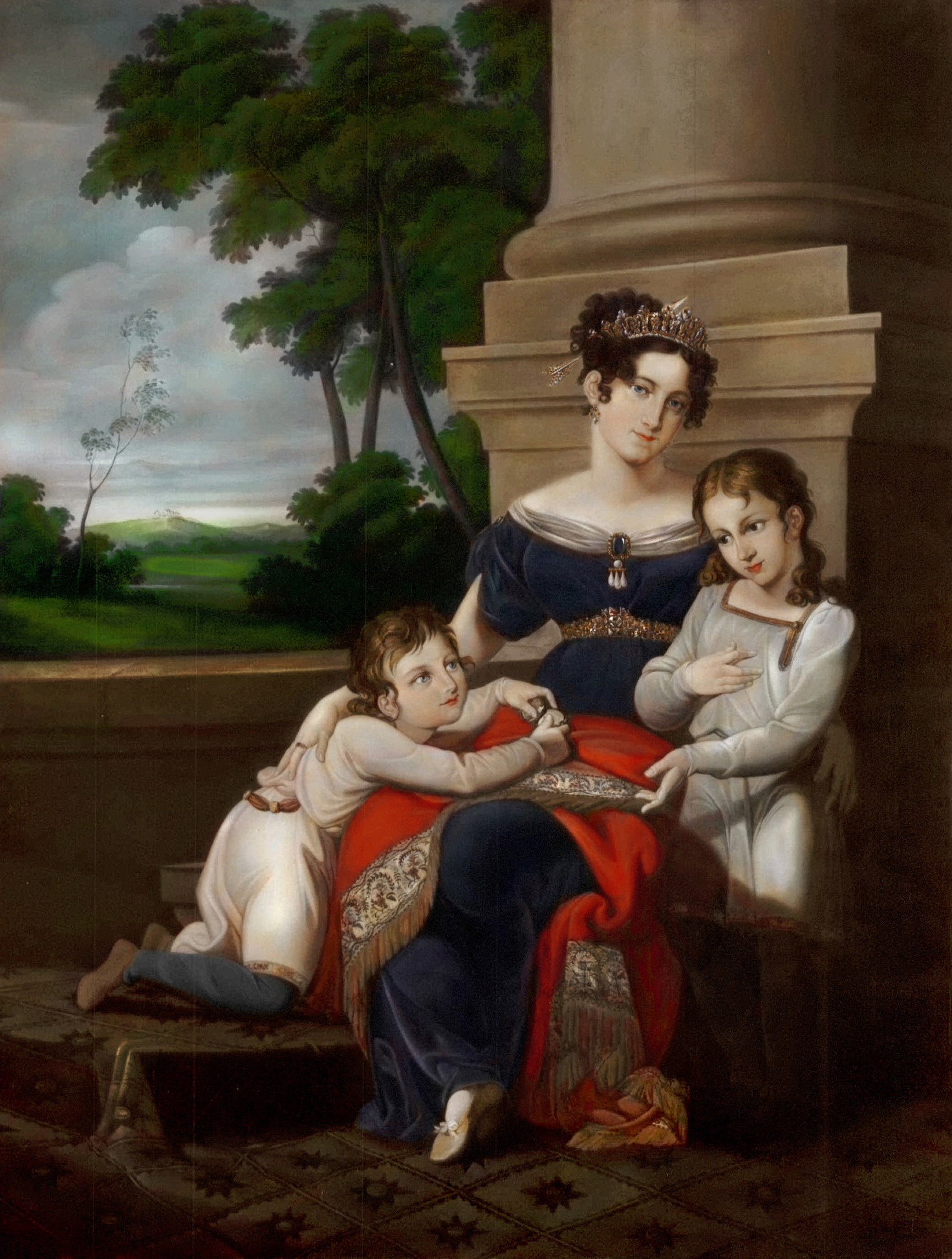
Albert (left) with his elder brother, Ernest, and mother, Louise, shortly before her exile from court

Albert was born on 26 August 1819 at Schloss Rosenau, near Coburg, Germany, the second son of Ernest III, Duke of Saxe-Coburg-Saalfeld, and his first wife, Louise of Saxe-Gotha-Altenburg. His first cousin and future wife, Victoria, had been born earlier in the same year with the assistance of the same midwife, Charlotte von Siebold. He was baptised into the Lutheran Evangelical Church on 19 September in the Marble Hall at Schloss Rosenau, with water taken from the local river, the Itz. His godparents were his paternal grandmother, the Dowager Duchess of Saxe-Coburg-Saalfeld; his maternal grandfather, the Duke of Saxe-Gotha-Altenburg; the Emperor of Austria; the Duke of Teschen; and Emanuel, Count of Mensdorff-Pouilly. In 1825, Albert's great-uncle, Frederick IV, Duke of Saxe-Gotha-Altenburg, died, which led to a realignment of the Saxon duchies the following year; and Albert's father became the first reigning duke of Saxe-Coburg and Gotha.

Albert and his elder brother, Ernest, spent their youth in close companionship, which was marred by their parents' turbulent marriage and eventual separation and divorce. After their mother was exiled from court in 1824, she married her lover, Alexander von Hanstein, Count of Pölzig and Beiersdorf. She presumably never saw her children again, and died of cancer at the age of 30 in 1831. The following year, their father married his niece, Princess Marie of Württemberg; their marriage was not close, however, and Marie had little – if any – impact on her stepsons' lives.

The brothers were educated privately at home by Christoph Florschütz and later studied in Brussels, where Adolphe Quetelet was one of their tutors. Like many other German princes, Albert attended the University of Bonn, where he studied law, political economy, philosophy and the history of art. He played music and he excelled at sport, especially fencing and riding. His tutors at Bonn included the philosopher Fichte and the poet Schlegel.

== Marriage ==
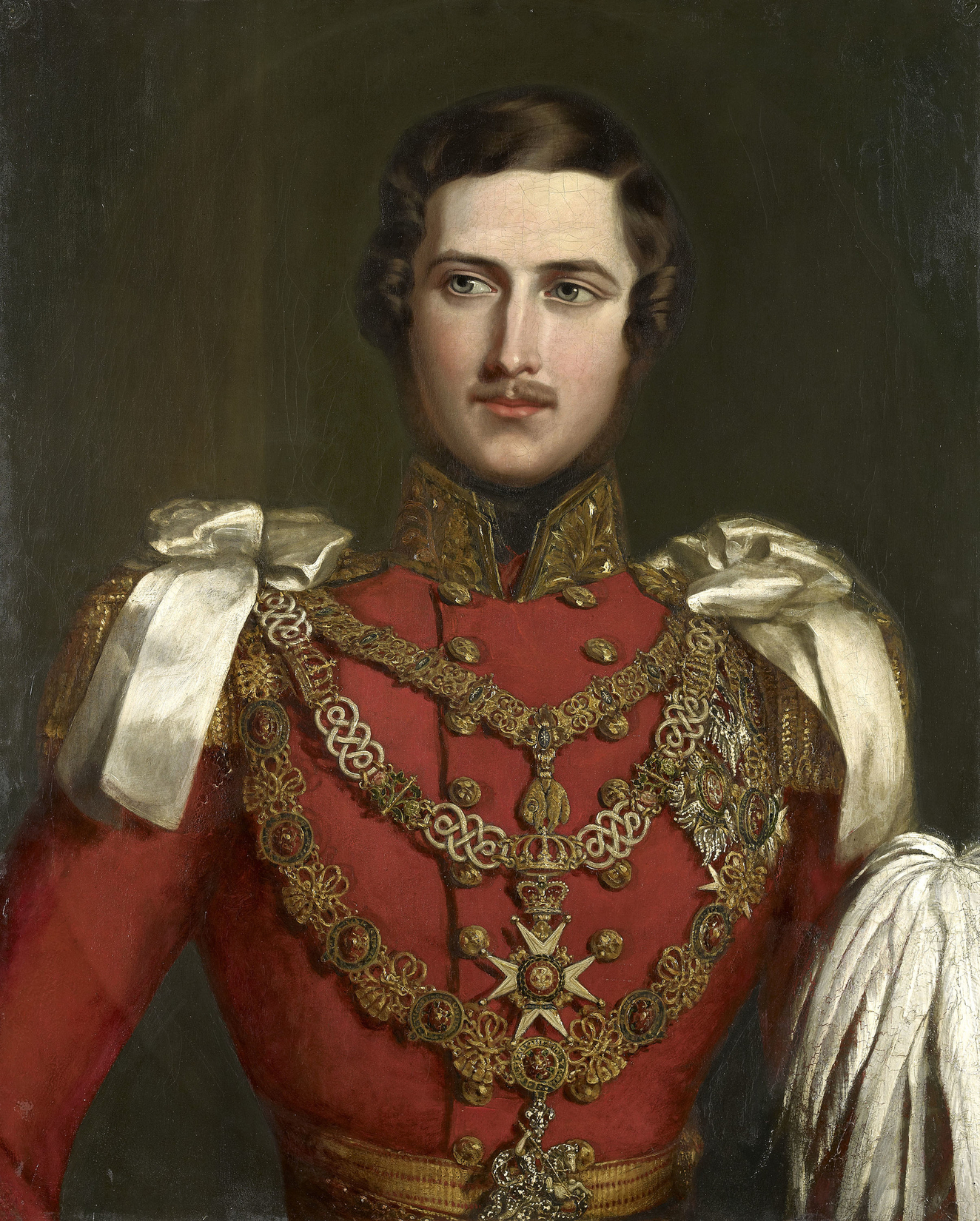
Portrait by John Partridge, 1840

The idea of marriage between Albert and his first cousin Victoria was first documented in an 1821 letter from his paternal grandmother, the Dowager Duchess of Saxe-Coburg-Saalfeld, who said that he was "the pendant to the pretty cousin". By 1836, this idea had also arisen in the mind of their ambitious uncle Leopold, who had been King of the Belgians since 1831. At this time, Victoria was the heir presumptive to the British throne. Her father, Prince Edward, Duke of Kent and Strathearn, the fourth son of King George III, had died when she was an infant, and her elderly uncle, King William IV, had no surviving legitimate children. Her mother, the Duchess of Kent, was the sister of both Albert's father – the Duke of Saxe-Coburg and Gotha – and King Leopold. Leopold arranged for his sister, Victoria's mother, to invite the Duke of Saxe-Coburg and Gotha and his two sons to visit her in May 1836, with the purpose of meeting Victoria. William IV, however, disapproved of any match with the Coburgs, and instead favoured the suit of Prince Alexander, second son of the Prince of Orange. Victoria was well aware of the various matrimonial plans and critically appraised a parade of eligible princes. She wrote, "[Albert] is extremely handsome; his hair is about the same colour as mine; his eyes are large and blue, and he has a beautiful nose and a very sweet mouth with fine teeth; but the charm of his countenance is his expression, which is most delightful." Alexander, on the other hand, she described as "very plain".

Victoria wrote to her uncle Leopold to thank him "for the prospect of great happiness you have contributed to give me, in the person of dear Albert ... He possesses every quality that could be desired to render me perfectly happy." Although the parties did not undertake a formal engagement, both the family and their retainers widely assumed that the match would take place.

Victoria came to the throne on 20 June 1837, aged 18. Her letters of the time show interest in Albert's education for the role he would have to play, although she resisted attempts to rush her into marriage. In the winter of 1838–1839, the prince visited Italy, accompanied by the Coburg family's confidential adviser, Baron Stockmar.

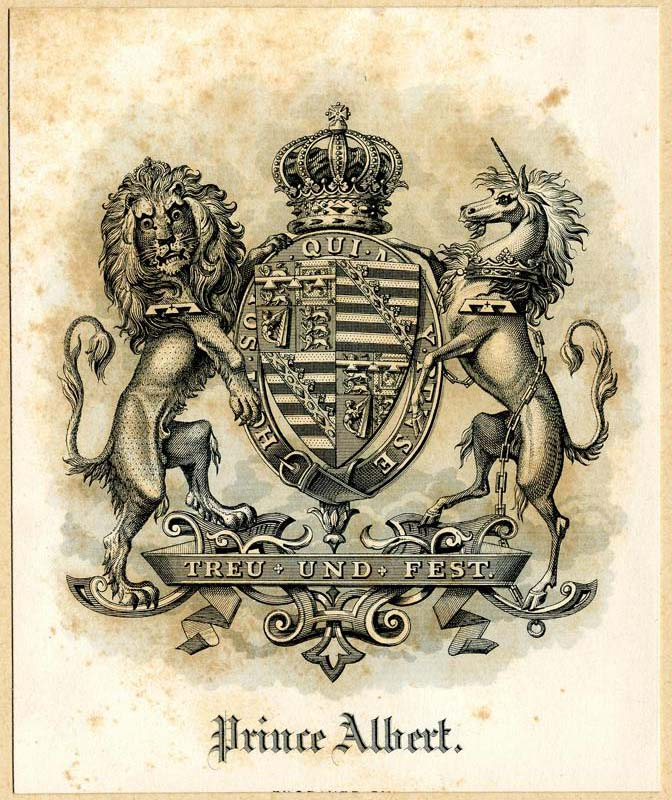
Armorial bookplate of Prince Albert

Albert returned to the United Kingdom with Ernest in October 1839 to visit Victoria, with the objective of settling the marriage. Albert and Victoria felt mutual affection and the Queen proposed to him on 15 October 1839. Victoria's intention to marry was declared formally to the Privy Council on 23 November, and the couple married on 10 February 1840 at the Chapel Royal, St James's Palace. Just before the marriage, Albert was naturalised by an Act of Parliament, and granted the style of Royal Highness by an Order in Council.

Initially Albert was not popular with the British public; he was perceived to be from an impoverished and undistinguished minor state, barely larger than a small English county. The British prime minister, Lord Melbourne, advised the Queen against granting her husband the title of "King Consort"; Parliament also objected to Albert being created a peer—partly because of anti-German sentiment and a desire to exclude Albert from any political role. Albert's religious views provided a small amount of controversy when the marriage was debated in Parliament: although as a member of the Lutheran Evangelical Church Albert was a Protestant, the non-Episcopal nature of his church was considered worrisome. Of greater concern, however, was that some of Albert's family were Roman Catholic. Melbourne led a minority government and the opposition took advantage of the marriage to weaken his position further. They opposed a British peerage for Albert and granted him a smaller annuity than previous consorts, £30,000 instead of the usual £50,000. Albert claimed that he had no need of a British peerage, writing: "It would almost be a step downwards, for as a Duke of Saxony, I feel myself much higher than a Duke of York or Kent." For the next seventeen years, Albert was formally titled "HRH Prince Albert" until, on 25 June 1857, Victoria formally granted him the title Prince Consort. Victoria explained, in a letter to Lord Palmerston on 15 March 1857, that she was: "... inclined ... to content herself by simply giving her husband by Letters Patent the title of 'Prince Consort' which can injure no one while it will give him an English title consistent with his position, & avoid his being treated by Foreign Courts as a junior Member of the house of Saxe-Coburg".

== Consort of the Queen ==
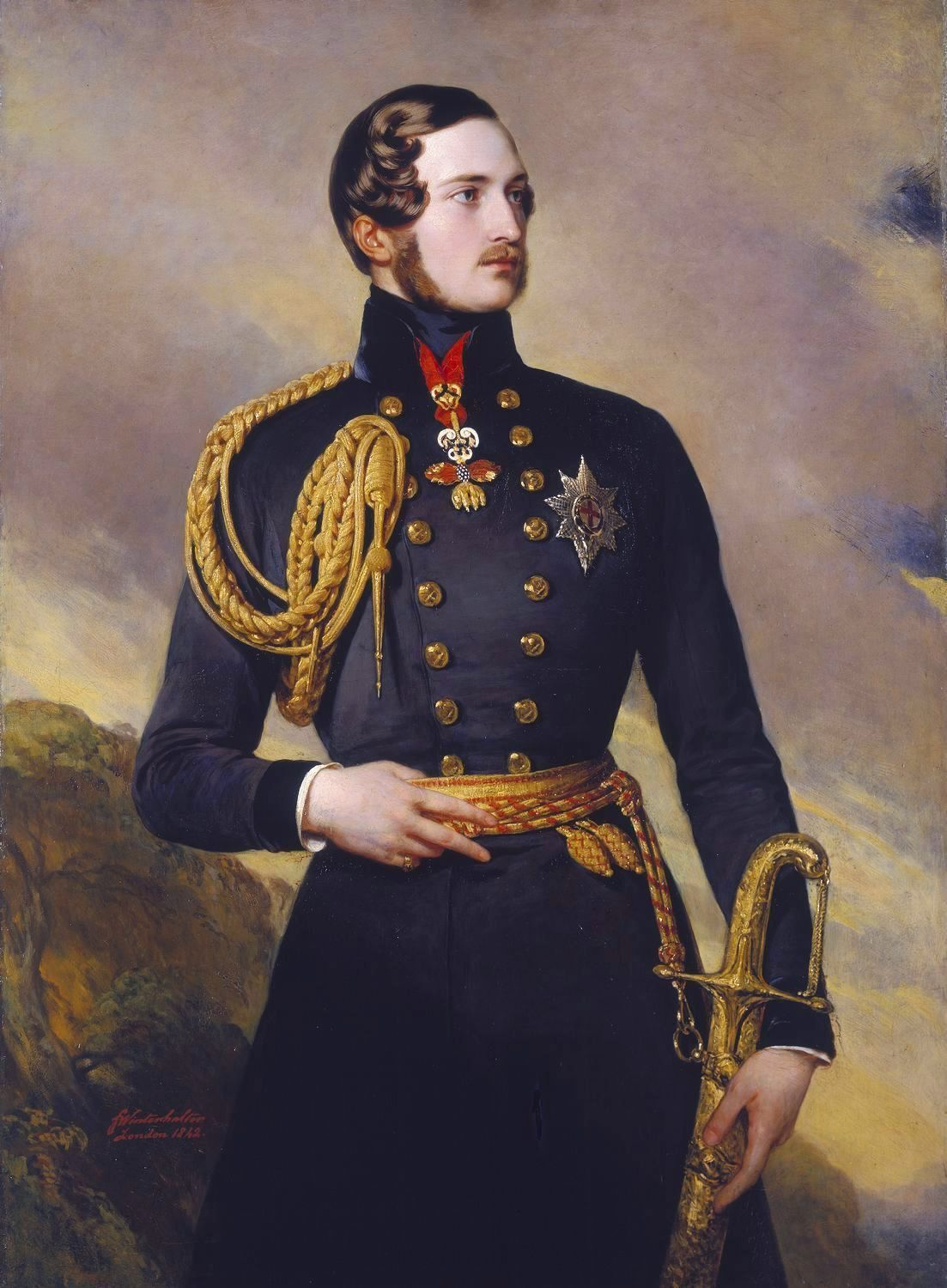
Portrait by Winterhalter, 1842

The position in which Albert was placed by his marriage, while one of distinction, also offered considerable difficulties; in his own words, "I am very happy and contented; but the difficulty in filling my place with the proper dignity is that I am only the husband, not the master in the house." This was not in reference to the Queen, but instead to Baroness Lehzen, Victoria's former governess who ran the royal household. Albert referred to her as the "House Dragon", and manoeuvred to dislodge the Baroness from her position.

Within two months of the marriage, Victoria was pregnant. Albert started to take on public roles; he became President of the Society for the Extinction of Slavery (slavery was still lawful in most parts of the world beyond the British Empire); and helped Victoria privately with her government paperwork.

In June 1840, while on a public carriage ride, Albert and the pregnant Victoria were shot at by Edward Oxford, who was later judged insane. Neither Albert nor Victoria was hurt, and Albert was praised in the newspapers for his courage and coolness during the attack. He was gaining public support as well as political influence, which showed itself practically when, in August, Parliament passed the Regency Act 1840 to designate him regent in the event of Victoria's death before their child reached the age of majority. Their first child, Victoria, named after her mother, was born in November. Eight other children would follow over the next seventeen years. All nine children survived to adulthood, which was remarkable for the era; biographer Hermione Hobhouse credited the healthy running of the nursery to Albert's "enlightened influence". In early 1841, he successfully removed the nursery from Lehzen's pervasive control, and in September 1842, Lehzen left Britain permanently – much to Albert's relief.

After the 1841 general election, Melbourne was replaced as prime minister by Sir Robert Peel, who appointed Albert chairman of the royal commission in charge of redecorating the new Palace of Westminster. The Palace had burned down seven years before, and was being rebuilt. The commission was set up to promote the fine arts in Britain as a patron and purchaser of pictures and sculpture. The commission's work was slow, and the palace's architect, Charles Barry, took many decisions out of the commissioners' hands by decorating rooms with ornate furnishings that were treated as part of the architecture. Albert was more successful as a private patron and collector. Among his notable acquisitions were early German and Italian paintings—such as Lucas Cranach the Elder's Apollo and Diana and Fra Angelico's St Peter Martyr – and contemporary pieces from Franz Xaver Winterhalter and Edwin Landseer. Ludwig Gruner, of Dresden, assisted Albert in buying artworks of the highest quality.

Albert and Victoria were shot at again on both 29 and 30 May 1842, but were unhurt. The culprit, John Francis, was detained and condemned to death, although he was later reprieved. Some of the couple's early unpopularity came about because of their stiffness and adherence to protocol in public, though in private the couple were more easy-going. In early 1844, Victoria and Albert were apart for the first time since their marriage when he returned to Coburg on the death of his father. Albert likened Victoria to a "consoling angel" after his father's death, proclaiming her the "treasure on which my whole existence rests" and their marriage "a union of heart and soul."

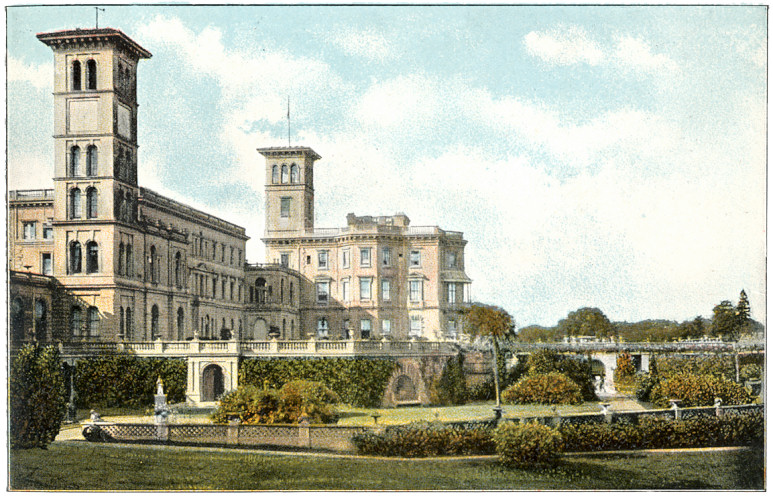
Osborne House, Isle of Wight

By 1844, Albert had managed to modernise the royal finances and, through various economies, had sufficient capital to purchase Osborne House on the Isle of Wight as a private residence for their growing family. Over the next few years a house modelled in the style of an Italianate villa was built to the designs of Albert and Thomas Cubitt. Albert laid out the grounds, and improved the estate and farm. He managed and improved the other royal estates; his model farm at Windsor (Shaw Farm) was admired by his biographers, and under his stewardship the revenues of the Duchy of Cornwall – the hereditary property of the Prince of Wales – steadily increased.

Unlike many landowners who approved of child labour and opposed Peel's repeal of the Corn Laws, Albert supported moves to raise working ages and free up trade. In 1846, Albert was rebuked by Lord George Bentinck when he attended the debate on the Corn Laws in the House of Commons to give tacit support to Peel. During Peel's premiership, Albert's authority behind, or beside, the throne became more apparent. He had access to all the Queen's papers, was drafting her correspondence and was present when she met her ministers; he would even see them alone in her absence. The clerk of the Privy Council, Charles Greville, wrote of him: "He is King to all intents and purposes."

Albert was the first member of the royal family to visit the Isle of Man in September 1847.

In 1847, Victoria and Albert spent a rainy holiday in the west of Scotland at Loch Laggan, but heard from their doctor, Sir James Clark, that Clark's son had enjoyed dry, sunny days farther east at Balmoral Castle. The tenant of Balmoral, Sir Robert Gordon, died suddenly in early October, and Albert began negotiations to take over the lease from the owner, the Earl Fife. In May the following year, Albert leased Balmoral, which he had never visited. In September 1848 he, his wife and their older children went there for the first time. They came to relish the privacy it afforded.

== Reformer and innovator ==
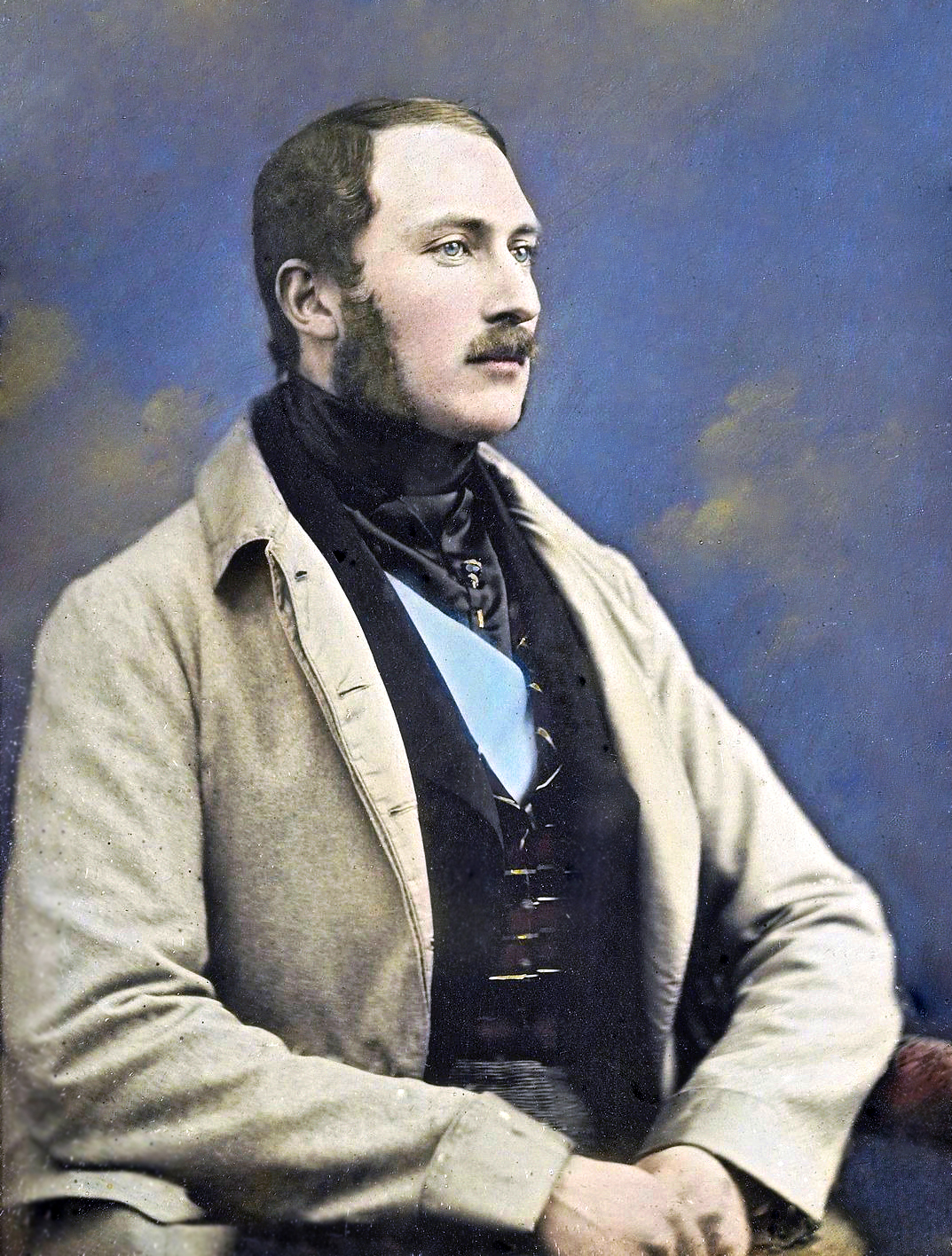
Early daguerreotype with hand-colouring, 1848

According to historian G. M. Trevelyan, regarding the Prince and home affairs:

His influence over the Queen was on the whole liberal; he greatly admired Peel, was a strong free-trader, and took more interest in scientific and commercial progress, and less in sport and fashion than was at all popular in the best society.

In 1847, Albert was elected Chancellor of the University of Cambridge after a close contest with the Earl of Powis. Albert used his position as chancellor to campaign successfully for reformed and more modern university curricula by expanding the subjects taught beyond the traditional mathematics and classics to include modern history and the natural sciences.

Revolutions spread throughout Europe in 1848 as a result of a widespread economic crisis. Throughout the year, Victoria and Albert complained about Foreign Secretary Palmerston's independent foreign policy, which they believed further destabilised Continental European powers. Albert was concerned for many of his royal relatives, a number of whom were deposed by revolutionaries. He and Victoria, who gave birth to their daughter Louise during that year, spent some time away from London in the relative safety of Osborne. Although there were sporadic demonstrations in England, no effective revolutionary action took place.

Albert gained public acclaim when he expressed paternalistic yet well-meaning and philanthropic views. In an 1848 speech to the Society for the Improvement of the Condition of the Labouring Classes, of which he was president, he expressed his "sympathy and interest for that class of our community who have most of the toil and fewest of the enjoyments of this world". It was the "duty of those who, under the blessings of Divine Providence, enjoy station, wealth, and education" to assist those less fortunate than themselves.

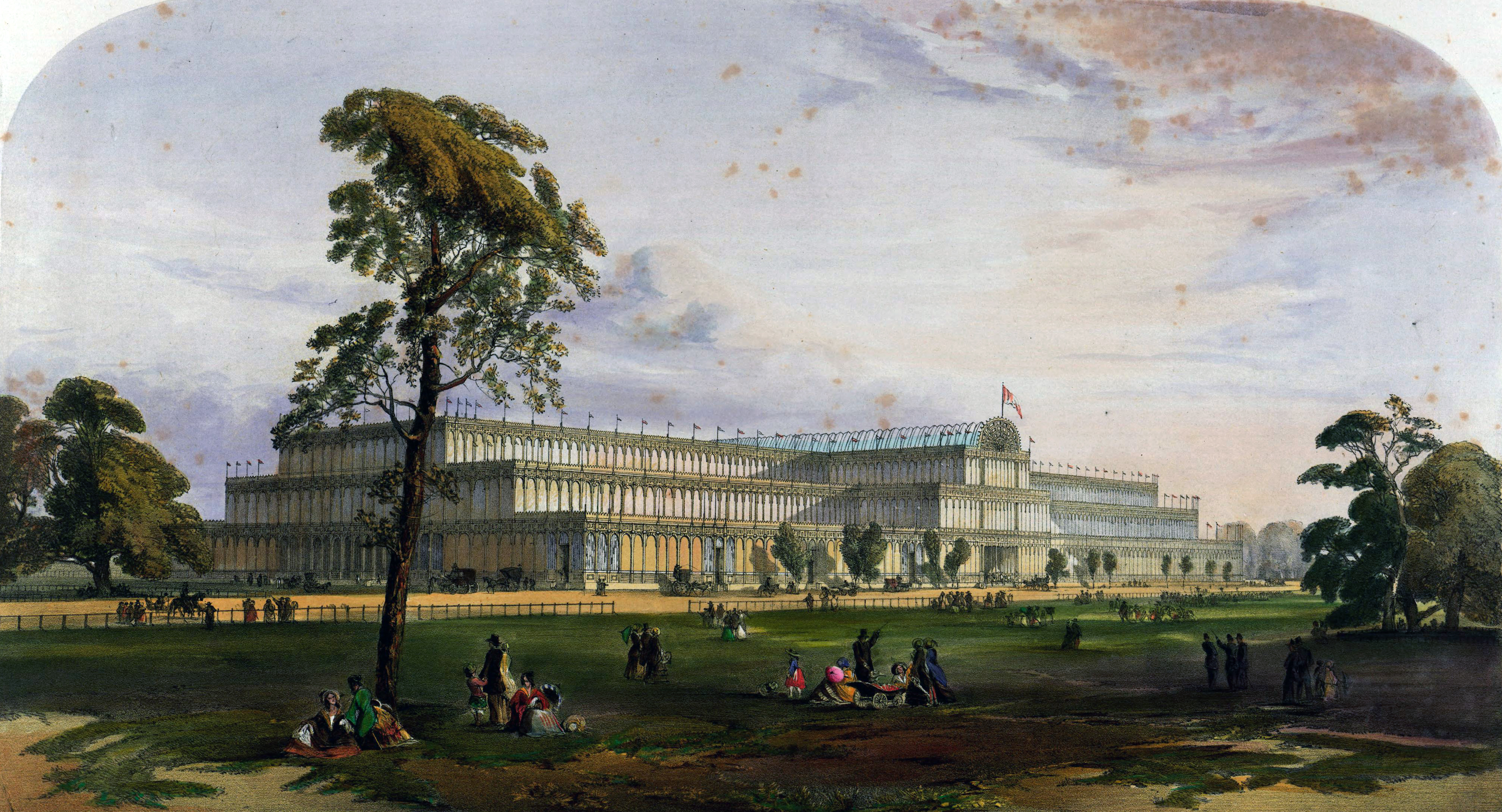
The Great Exhibition of 1851 was housed in the Crystal Palace in Hyde Park, London.

His progressive and relatively liberal ideas were expressed by his support of emancipation, technological progress, science education, the ideas of Charles Darwin, and the welfare of the working classes. Albert led reforms in university education, welfare and the royal finances, and supported the campaign against slavery. He also had a special interest in applying science and art to manufacturing industry.

Albert sympathized with Jewish emancipation, and his influence was sought to secure the right of Jews to serve in parliament. In 1860, Albert used the opportunity of congratulating the Prince Regent of Prussia on the birth of their granddaughter Princess Charlotte of Prussia to raise concerns about various European matters, such as reform in the Austrian empire. In the letter, Albert proclaimed it "high time" that Emperor Franz Joseph I caused justice to be done to Protestants, Hungarians, and Jews, three groups that had long been faced wrongs under the Hapsburg monarchy in Austria.

The Great Exhibition of 1851 arose from the annual exhibitions of the Society of Arts, of which Albert was president from 1843, and owed most of its success to his efforts to promote it. Albert served as president of the Royal Commission for the Exhibition of 1851, and had to fight for every stage of the project. In the House of Lords, Lord Brougham fulminated against the proposal to hold the exhibition in Hyde Park. Opponents of the exhibition prophesied that foreign rogues and revolutionists would overrun England, subvert the morals of the people, and destroy their faith. Albert thought such talk absurd and quietly persevered, trusting always that British manufacturing would benefit from exposure to the best products of foreign countries.

Victoria opened the exhibition on 1 May 1851 in a specially designed and built glass building known as the Crystal Palace. It proved a colossal success. A surplus of £180,000 was used to purchase land in South Kensington on which to establish educational and cultural institutions, including the Natural History Museum, Science Museum, Imperial College London and what would later be named the Royal Albert Hall and the Victoria and Albert Museum. The area was referred to as "Albertopolis" by sceptics.

== Family and public life (1852–1859) ==
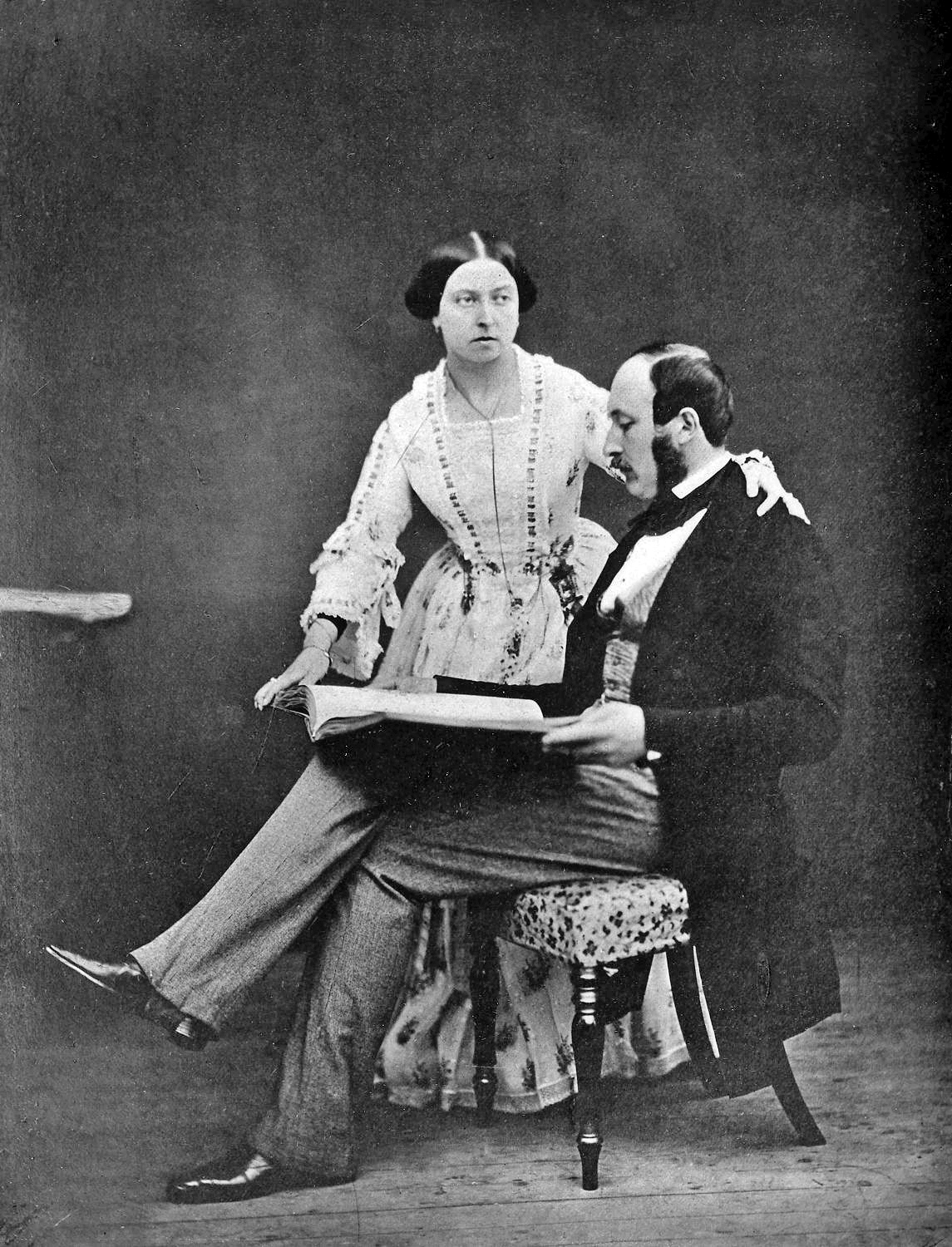
Victoria and Albert, 1854

In 1852, John Camden Neild, an eccentric miser, left Victoria an unexpected legacy, which Albert used to obtain the freehold of Balmoral. As usual, he embarked on an extensive programme of improvements. The same year, he was appointed to several of the offices left vacant by the death of the Duke of Wellington, including the mastership of Trinity House and the colonelcy of the Grenadier Guards. With Wellington's death, Albert was able to propose and campaign for modernisation of the army, which was long overdue. Thinking that the military was unready for war and that Christian rule was preferable to Islamic rule, Albert counselled a diplomatic solution to conflict between the Russian and Ottoman empires. Palmerston was more bellicose, and favoured a policy that would prevent further Russian expansion. Palmerston was manoeuvred out of the cabinet in December 1853, but at about the same time a Russian fleet attacked the Ottoman fleet at anchor at Sinop. The London press depicted the attack as a criminal massacre, and Palmerston's popularity surged as Albert's fell. Within two weeks, Palmerston was re-appointed a minister. As public outrage at the Russian action continued, false rumours circulated that Albert had been arrested for treason and was being held prisoner in the Tower of London.

By March 1854, Britain and Russia were embroiled in the Crimean War. Albert devised a master plan for winning the war by laying siege to Sevastopol while starving Russia economically, which became the Allied strategy after the Tsar decided to fight a purely defensive war. Early British optimism soon faded as the press reported that British troops were ill-equipped and mismanaged by aged generals using out-of-date tactics and strategy. The conflict dragged on as the Russians were as poorly prepared as their opponents. The Prime Minister, Lord Aberdeen, resigned, and Palmerston succeeded him. A negotiated settlement eventually put an end to the war by the March 1856 Treaty of Paris. During the war, Albert arranged the marriage of his fourteen-year-old daughter, Victoria, to Prince Frederick William of Prussia, but Albert delayed the marriage until Victoria was seventeen. Albert hoped that his daughter and son-in-law would be a liberalising influence in the enlarging but very conservative Prussian state.

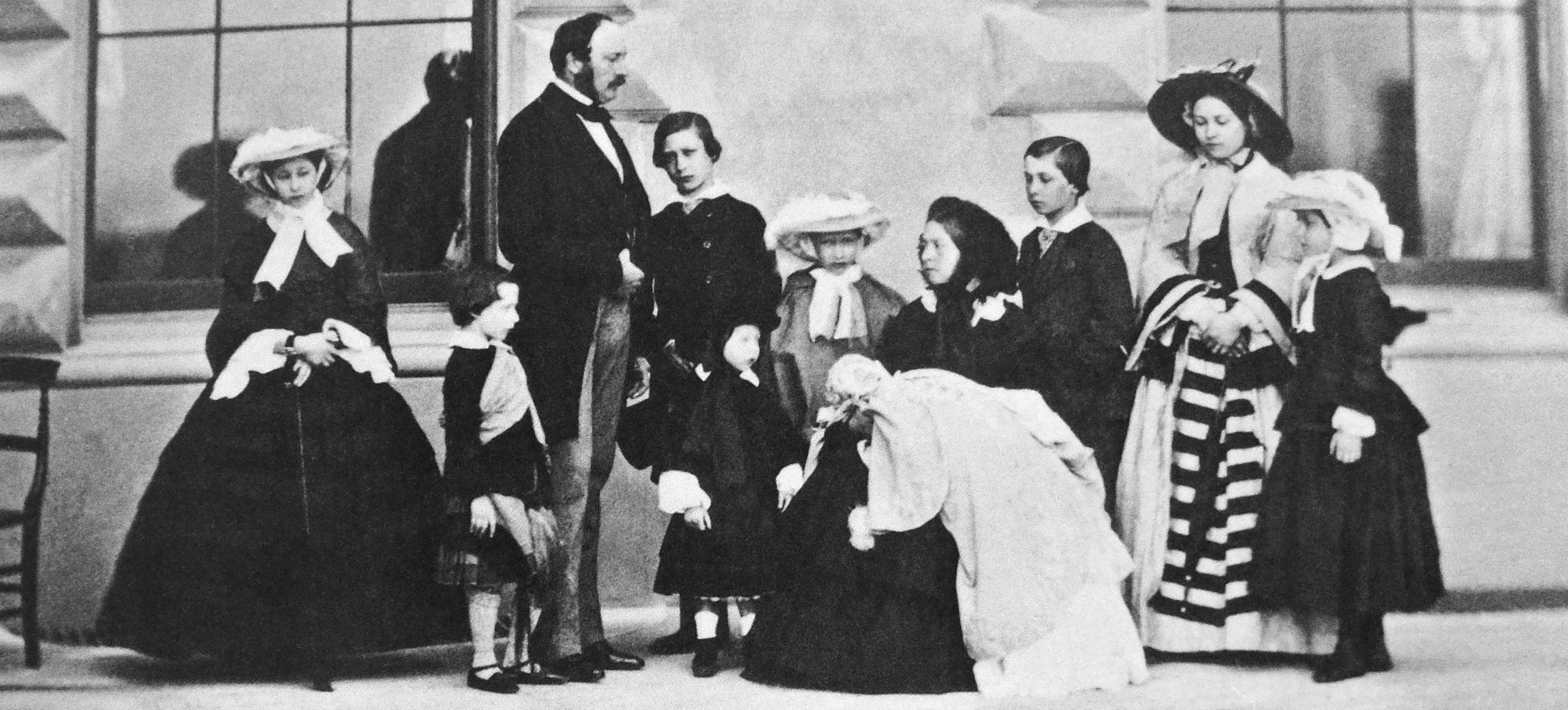
Albert, Victoria and their nine children, 1857. Left to right: Alice, Arthur, Albert (Prince Consort), Albert Edward (Prince of Wales), Leopold, Louise, Queen Victoria with Beatrice, Alfred, Victoria and Helena

Albert promoted many public educational institutions. Chiefly at meetings in connection with them, he spoke of the need for better schooling. A collection of his speeches was published in 1857. Recognised as a supporter of education and technological progress, he was invited to speak at scientific meetings, such as the memorable address he delivered as president of the British Association for the Advancement of Science when it met at Aberdeen in 1859. His espousal of science met with clerical opposition; he and Palmerston unsuccessfully recommended a knighthood for Charles Darwin, after the publication of On the Origin of Species, which was opposed by the Bishop of Oxford.

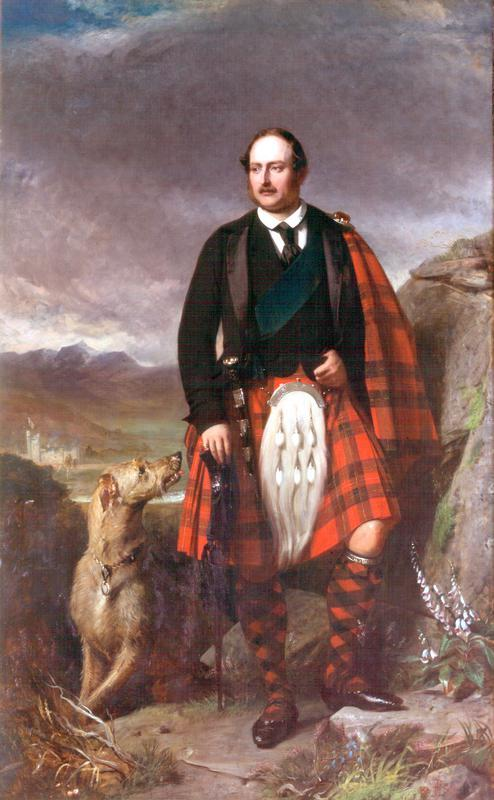
Portrait by John Phillip, 1859

Albert continued to devote himself to the education of his family and the management of the royal household. His children's governess, Lady Lyttelton, thought him unusually kind and patient, and described him joining in family games with enthusiasm. He felt keenly the departure of his eldest daughter for Prussia when she married her fiancé at the beginning of 1858, and was disappointed that his eldest son, the Prince of Wales, did not respond well to the intense educational programme that Albert had designed for him. At the age of seven, the Prince of Wales was expected to take six hours of instruction, including an hour of German and an hour of French every day. When the Prince of Wales failed at his lessons, Albert caned him. Corporal punishment was common at the time, and was not thought unduly harsh. Albert's biographer Roger Fulford wrote that the relationships between the family members were "friendly, affectionate and normal ... there is no evidence either in the Royal Archives or in the printed authorities to justify the belief that the relations between the Prince and his eldest son were other than deeply affectionate". Philip Magnus wrote in his biography of Albert's eldest son that Albert "tried to treat his children as equals; and they were able to penetrate his stiffness and reserve because they realised instinctively not only that he loved them but that he enjoyed and needed their company".

Albert was a talented amateur musician and composer. For his wedding, he composed a duet, Die Liebe hat uns nun vereint ("Love has now united us"). Felix Mendelssohn described Albert playing the Buckingham Palace organ "so charmingly and clearly and correctly that it would have done credit to any professional". After tuition from George Elvey, the organist at St George's Chapel, Windsor, Albert composed several choral pieces for Anglican worship, including settings of the Te Deum and Jubilate, and an anthem, Out of the Deep. His secular compositions included a cantata, L'Invocazione all'armonia, and Melody for the Violin, which Yehudi Menuhin later described as "pleasant music without presumption".

== Illness and death ==
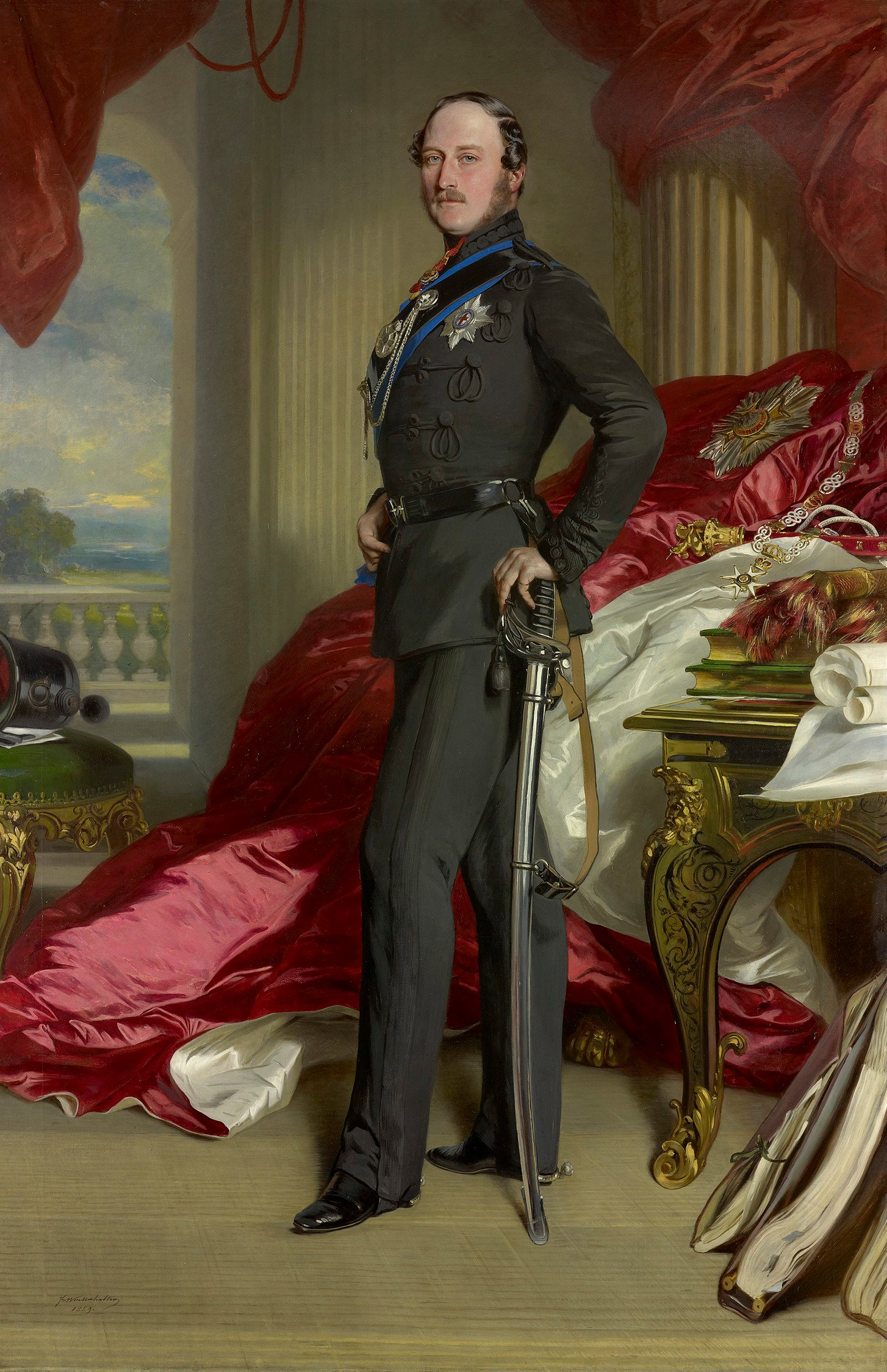
State portrait by Winterhalter, 1859

In August 1859, Albert fell seriously ill with stomach cramps. His steadily worsening medical condition led to a sense of despair; the biographer Robert Rhodes James describes Albert as having lost "the will to live". Albert later had an accidental brush with death during a trip to Coburg in October 1860, when he was driving alone in a carriage drawn by four horses that suddenly bolted. As the horses continued to gallop toward a wagon waiting at a railway crossing, Albert jumped for his life from the carriage. One of the horses was killed in the collision, and Albert was badly shaken though his only physical injuries were cuts and bruises. He confided in his brother and eldest daughter that he sensed that his time had come.

Victoria's mother and Albert's aunt, the Duchess of Kent, died in March 1861, and Victoria was grief-stricken. Albert took on most of the Queen's duties despite his continuing chronic stomach trouble. The last public event over which he presided was the opening of the Royal Horticultural Gardens on 5 June 1861. In August, Victoria and Albert visited the Curragh Camp, Ireland, where the Prince of Wales was attending army manoeuvres. At the Curragh, the Prince of Wales was introduced by his fellow officers to Nellie Clifden, an Irish actress.

By November, Victoria and Albert had returned to Windsor, and the Prince of Wales had returned to Cambridge, where he was a student. Two of Albert's young cousins, King Pedro V of Portugal and his brother Ferdinand, died of typhoid fever within five days of each other in early November. On top of that news, Albert was informed that gossip was spreading in gentlemen's clubs and the foreign press that the Prince of Wales was involved with Clifden. Albert and Victoria were horrified by their son's indiscretion and feared blackmail, scandal or pregnancy. Although Albert was ill and at a low ebb, he travelled to Cambridge to see the Prince of Wales on 25 November and discuss the indiscreet affair. In his final weeks, Albert suffered from pains in his back and legs.

Also in November 1861, the Trent Affair – the forcible removal of Confederate envoys from a British ship, the RMS Trent, by Union forces during the American Civil War – threatened war between the United States and Britain. The British government prepared an ultimatum and readied a military response. Albert was gravely ill but intervened to defuse the crisis. In a few hours, he revised the British demands in a manner that allowed the Lincoln administration to surrender the Confederate commissioners who had been seized from the Trent and to issue a public apology to London without losing face. The key idea, based on a suggestion from The Times, was to give Washington the opportunity to deny that it had officially authorised the seizure and thereby to apologise for the captain's mistake, ensuring that Britain would not go to war with America and intervene on behalf of the Confederacy.

On 9 December, one of Albert's physicians, William Jenner, diagnosed him with typhoid fever. Albert died in the Blue Room at Windsor Castle at 10:50 pm on 14 December 1861, in the presence of Victoria and five of their nine children. (Note: The children present were Edward, Alice, Louise, Helena and Arthur. Victoria was in Germany, Leopold in France and Alfred at sea. Beatrice, the youngest, remained outside the room.) He was 42. Although the contemporary diagnosis was typhoid fever, modern writers have noted that Albert's persistent stomach pain, which had troubled him for at least two years before his death, may suggest that a chronic condition such as Crohn's disease, kidney failure, or abdominal cancer was the cause of death.

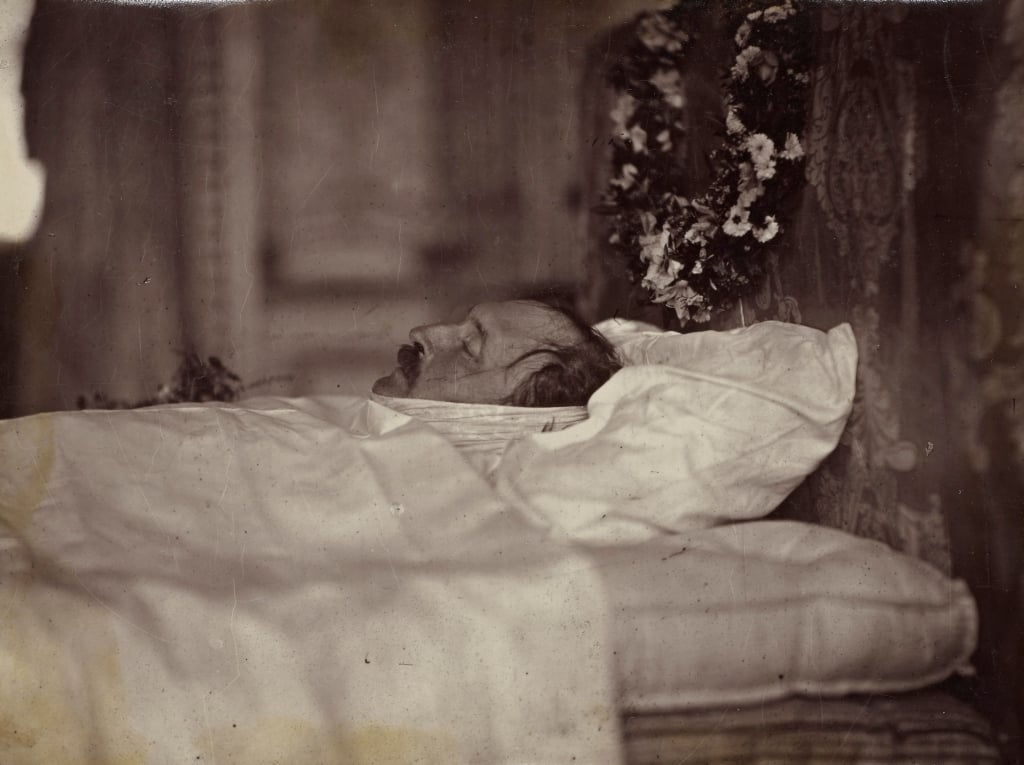
Albert in his deathbed, December 1861

Albert's funeral was held on 23 December at St George's Chapel, Windsor Castle. His body was temporarily entombed in the chapel's Royal Vault. A year after his death, his remains were deposited at the Royal Mausoleum, Frogmore, which remained incomplete until 1871. The sarcophagus, in which both he and Victoria were eventually laid, was carved from the largest block of granite that had ever been quarried in Britain.

The Queen's grief was overwhelming, and the tepid feelings that the public had for Albert were replaced by sympathy. The widowed Victoria never recovered from Albert's death; she entered into a deep state of mourning and wore black for the rest of her life. Albert's rooms in all his houses were kept as they had been even with hot water brought in the morning and linen and towels changed daily. Such practices were common in the houses of the very rich.

== Legacy ==
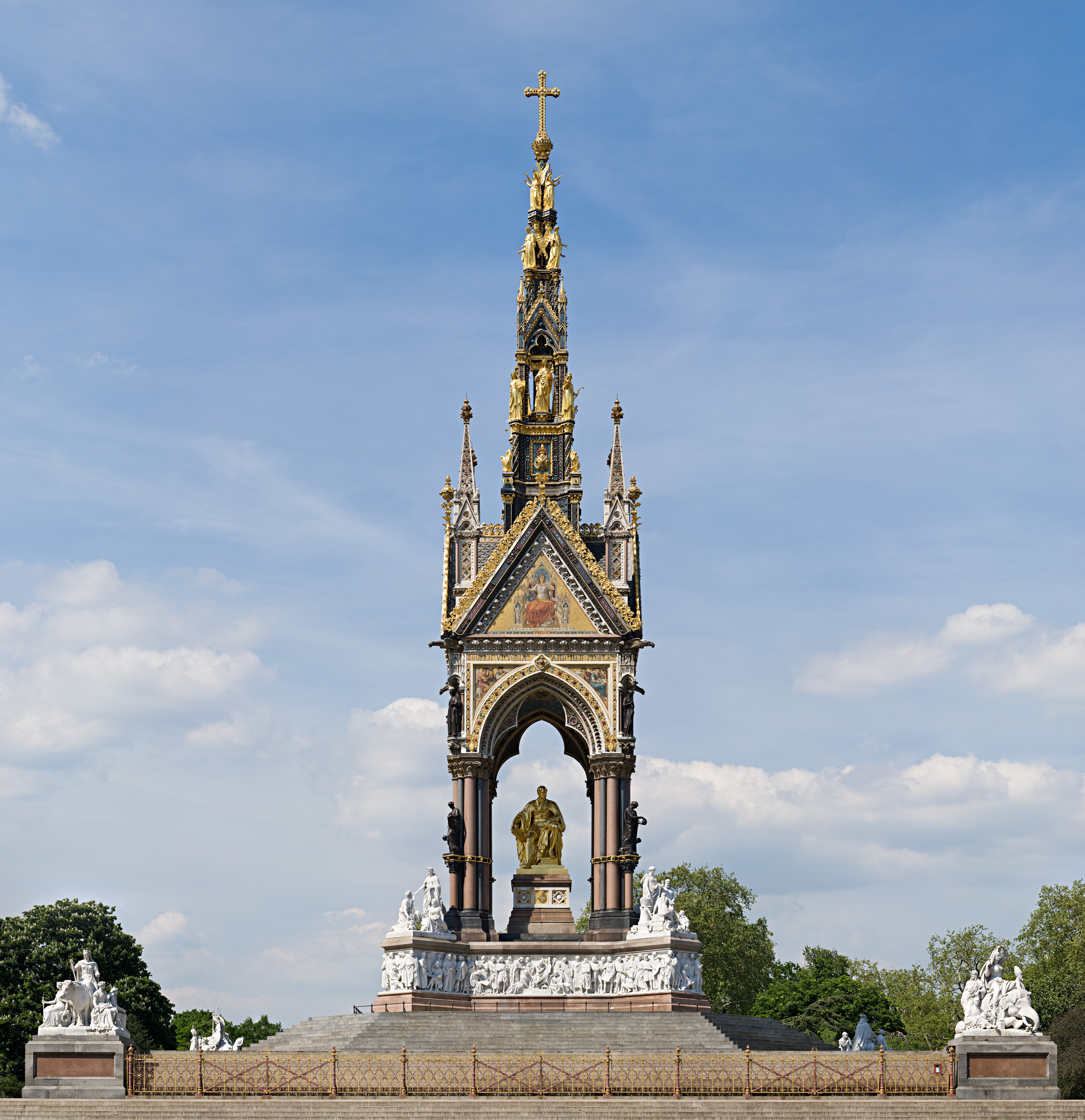
The Albert Memorial in Hyde Park, London

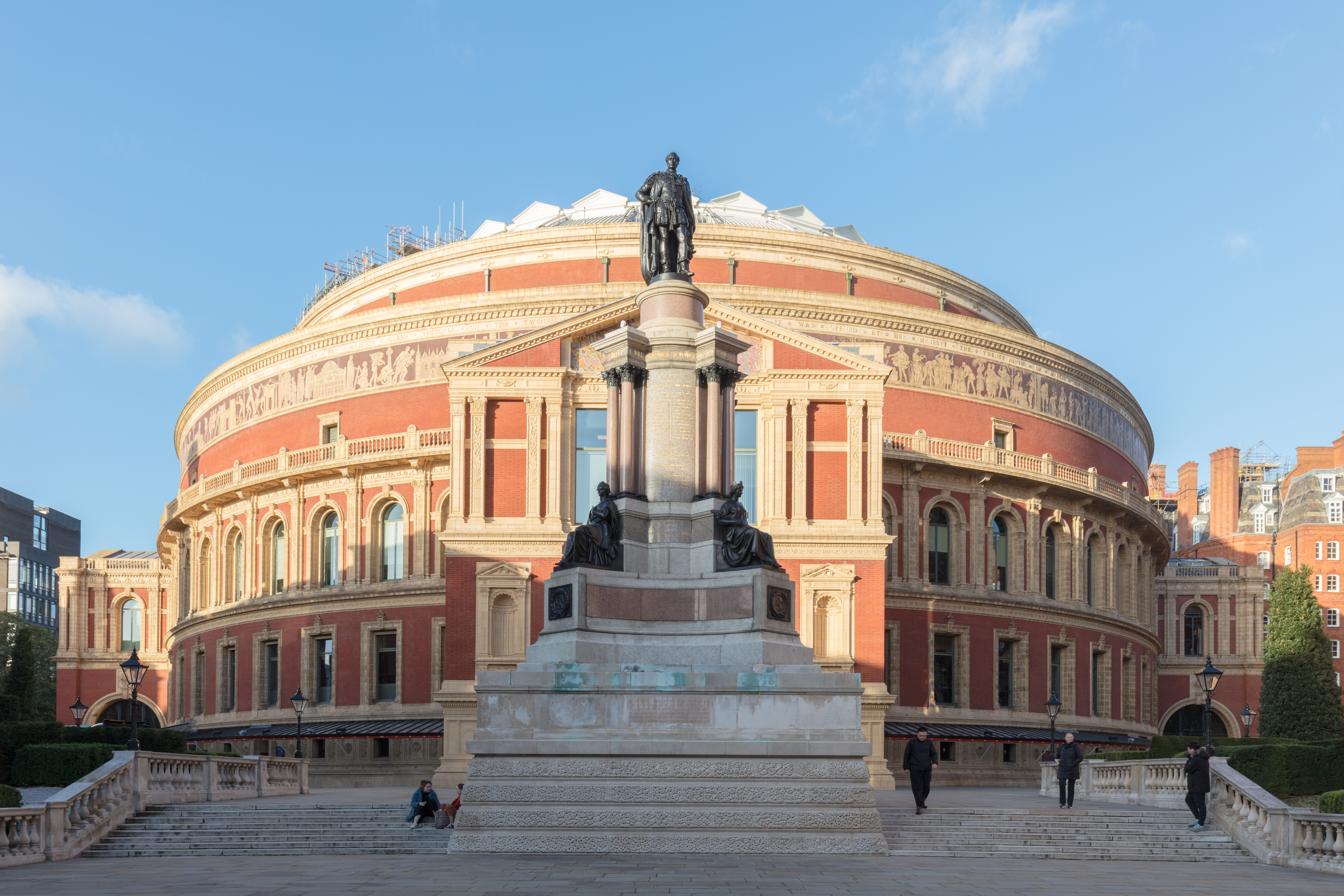
Royal Albert Hall, South Kensington, London

After Albert's death, Victoria withdrew from public life and her seclusion eroded some of Albert's work in attempting to remodel the monarchy as a national institution by setting a moral, if not political, example. Albert is credited with introducing the principle that the British royal family should remain above politics. Before his marriage to Victoria, she supported the Whigs. For example, early in her reign, Victoria had managed to thwart the formation of a Tory government by Sir Robert Peel by refusing to accept substitutions that Peel wanted to make among her ladies-in-waiting.

Despite Albert's request for no effigies of him to be raised, many public monuments were erected all over the country and across the British Empire. The most notable are the Royal Albert Hall and the Albert Memorial in London. The plethora of memorials erected to Albert became so great that Charles Dickens told a friend that he sought an "inaccessible cave" to escape from them.

Albert showed a keen interest in the improvement of army training, and was involved in the establishment and development of Aldershot in Hampshire as a garrison town and training base in the 1850s. A wooden Royal Pavilion was built there in which he and Victoria would often stay when they attended military reviews. Albert established and endowed the Prince Consort's Library at Aldershot, which still exists.

Biographies published after his death were typically heavy on eulogy. Theodore Martin's five-volume magnum opus was authorised and supervised by Queen Victoria, and her influence shows in its pages. Nevertheless, it is an accurate and exhaustive account. Lytton Strachey's Queen Victoria (1921) was more critical, but it was discredited in part by mid-20th-century biographers such as Hector Bolitho and Roger Fulford, who, unlike Strachey, had access to Victoria's journal and letters.

Scholars dismiss popular myths about Albert, such as the claim that he introduced Christmas trees to Britain. Recent biographers such as Stanley Weintraub portray Albert as a figure in a tragic romance who died too soon and was mourned by his lover for a lifetime. In the 2009 film The Young Victoria, Albert, played by Rupert Friend, is made into a heroic character. In the fictionalised depiction of the 1840 shooting, he is struck by a bullet, which did not happen in real life.

== Titles, styles, honours and arms ==
=== Titles and styles ===
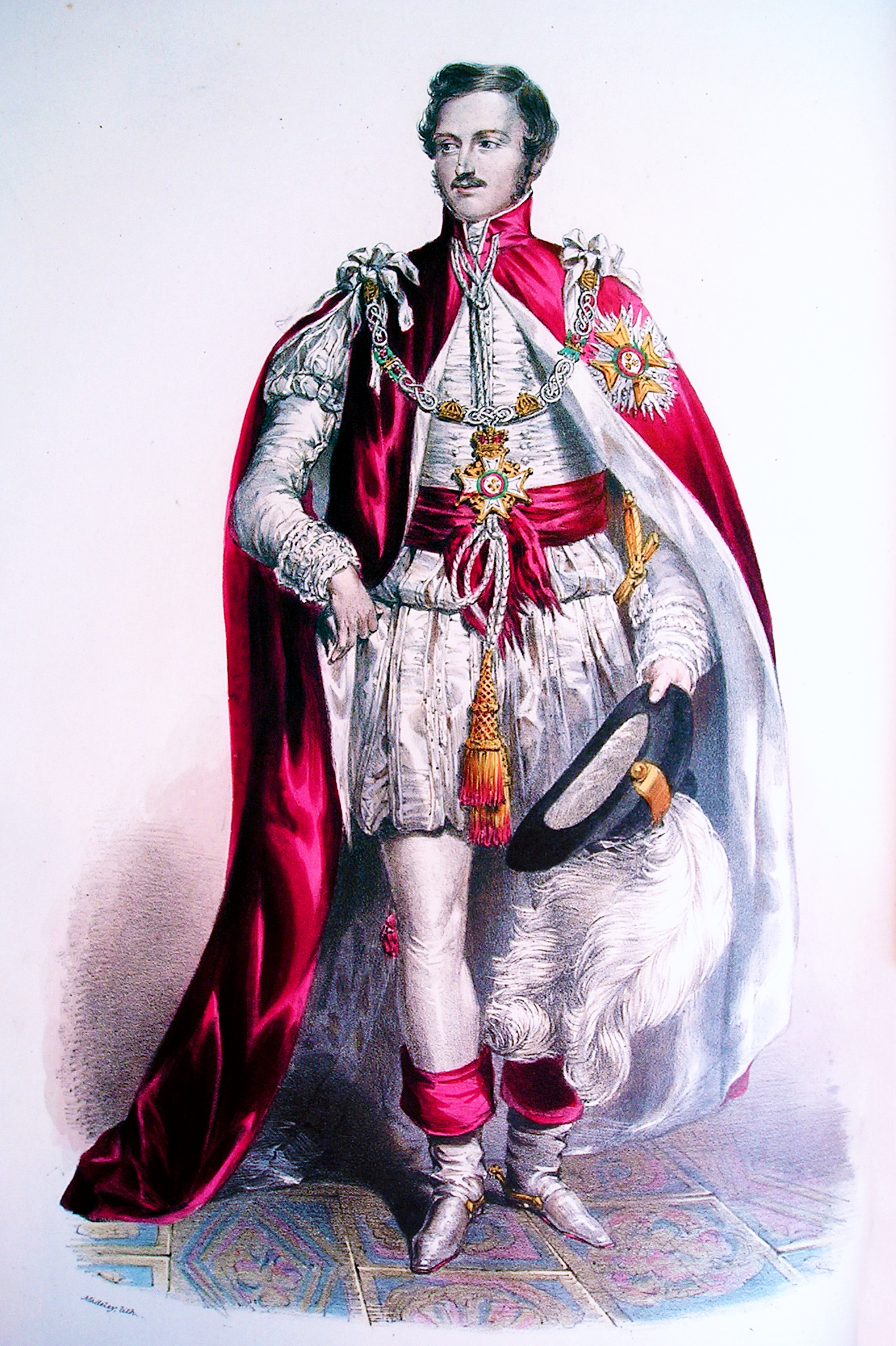
Albert robed as a Knight Grand Cross of the Bath, 1842

In the United Kingdom, Albert was styled "His Serene Highness Prince Albert of Saxe-Coburg and Gotha" in the months before his marriage. He was granted the style of Royal Highness on 6 February 1840, and given the title of Prince Consort on 25 June 1857.

=== British honours ===
- KG: Royal Knight Companion of the Most Noble Order of the Garter, 16 December 1839
- GCB: Knight Grand Cross of the Most Honourable Order of the Bath (Military), 6 March 1840; Great Master, 25 May 1847
- GCMG: Knight Grand Cross of the Most Distinguished Order of Saint Michael and Saint George, 15 January 1842
- KT: Extra Knight of the Most Ancient and Most Noble Order of the Thistle, 17 January 1842
- KP: Extra and Principal Knight of the Most Illustrious Order of Saint Patrick, 20 January 1842
- KSI: Extra Knight of the Most Exalted Order of the Star of India, 25 June 1861

==== Military appointments ====
- Field Marshal of the British Army, 8 February 1840
- Colonel-in-chief of the 11th (Prince Albert's Own) Hussars, 30 April 1840 – 1842
- Colonel of the Scots Fusilier Guards, 25 April 1842 – 1852
- Captain-general and Colonel of the Honourable Artillery Company, 1843
- Constable and Governor of Windsor Castle, 1843
- Colonel-in-chief of the 60th (The King's Royal Rifle Corps) Regiment of Foot, 15 August 1850 – 1852
- Colonel of the 1st Grenadier Guards, 23 August 1852
- Colonel-in-chief of the Rifle Brigade, 23 September 1852

=== Foreign honours ===
- Ernestine duchies: Grand Cross of the Saxe-Ernestine House Order, February 1836
- Portugal:
  - Grand Cross of the Royal Military Order of Our Lord Jesus Christ, 23 April 1836
  - Grand Cross of the Sash of the Two Orders (Aviz and St. James), 30 September 1857
  - Grand Cross of the Tower and Sword, 25 November 1858
- Belgium: Grand Cordon of the Order of Leopold, 18 November 1839 – wedding gift
- Saxony: Knight of the Rue Crown, 1839
- Saxe-Weimar-Eisenach: Grand Cross of the White Falcon, 13 January 1840
- Spain: Knight of the Golden Fleece, 27 April 1841 – invested by the Duke of Wellington on behalf of Queen Isabella II
- Prussia:
  - Knight of the Black Eagle, 30 January 1842
  - Knight of the Red Eagle, 1st Class
- Sardinia: Knight of the Annunciation, 13 December 1842
- Netherlands: Grand Cross of the Netherlands Lion, 1842
- Denmark: Knight of the Elephant, 10 January 1843
- Russia:
  - Knight of St. Andrew, 1 July 1843
  - Knight of St. Alexander Nevsky, 1 July 1843
  - Knight of the White Eagle, 1 July 1843
  - Knight of St. Anna, 1st Class, 1 July 1843
- France: Grand Cross of the Legion of Honour, 5 September 1843
- Austria: Grand Cross of the Royal Hungarian Order of St. Stephen, 1843
- Württemberg: Grand Cross of the Württemberg Crown, 1843
- Baden:
  - Knight of the House Order of Fidelity, 1845
  - Grand Cross of the Zähringer Lion, 1845
- Bavaria: Knight of St. Hubert, 1845
- Two Sicilies: Grand Cross of St. Ferdinand and Merit, 1846
- Hanover:
  - Knight of St. George, 1853
  - Grand Cross of the Royal Guelphic Order, 1853
- Sovereign Military Order of Malta: Bailiff Grand Cross of Honour and Devotion
- Sweden-Norway: Knight of the Seraphim, 12 February 1856
- Ottoman Empire: Order of the Medjidie, 1st Class in Diamonds, 1856

=== Arms ===
Coat of arms of Prince Albert of Saxe-Coburg and Gotha as granted in 1840

Upon his marriage to Queen Victoria in 1840, Prince Albert received a personal grant of arms, being the royal coat of arms of the United Kingdom differenced by a white three-point label with a red cross in the centre, quartered with his ancestral arms of Saxony. They are blazoned: "Quarterly, 1st and 4th, the Royal Arms, with overall a label of three points Argent charged on the centre with cross Gules; 2nd and 3rd, Barry of ten Or and Sable, a crown of rue in bend Vert". The arms are unusual, being described by S. T. Aveling as a "singular example of quartering differenced arms, [which] is not in accordance with the rules of Heraldry, and is in itself an heraldic contradiction." Prior to his marriage Albert used the arms of his father undifferenced, in accordance with German custom.

Albert's Garter stall plate displays his arms surmounted by a royal crown with six crests for the House of Saxe-Coburg and Gotha; these are from left to right: 1. "A bull's head caboshed Gules armed and ringed Argent, crowned Or, the rim chequy Gules and Argent" for Mark. 2. "Out of a coronet Or, two buffalo horns Argent, attached to the outer edge of five branches fesswise each with three linden leaves Vert" for Thuringia. 3. "Out of a coronet Or, a pyramidal chapeau charged with the arms of Saxony ensigned by a plume of peacock feathers Proper out of a coronet also Or" for Saxony. 4. "A bearded man in profile couped below the shoulders clothed paly Argent and Gules, the pointed coronet similarly paly terminating in a plume of three peacock feathers" for Meissen. 5. "A demi griffin displayed Or, winged Sable, collared and langued Gules" for Jülich. 6. "Out of a coronet Or, a panache of peacock feathers Proper" for Berg. The supporters were the crowned lion of England and the unicorn of Scotland (as in the Royal Arms) charged on the shoulder with a label as in the arms. Albert's personal motto is the German Treu und Fest (Loyal and Sure). This motto was also used by Prince Albert's Own or the 11th Hussars.

== Issue ==
Name	Birth	Death	Notes
Victoria, Princess Royal	21 November 1840	5 August 1901	married 1858, Crown Prince Frederick, later Frederick III, German Emperor; had issue
Edward VII, King of the United Kingdom	9 November 1841	6 May 1910	married 1863, Princess Alexandra of Denmark; had issue
Princess Alice	25 April 1843	14 December 1878	married 1862, Prince Louis, later Ludwig IV, Grand Duke of Hesse and by Rhine; had issue
Alfred, Duke of Saxe-Coburg and Gotha	6 August 1844	30 July 1900	married 1874, Grand Duchess Marie Alexandrovna of Russia; had issue
Princess Helena	25 May 1846	9 June 1923	married 1866, Prince Christian of Schleswig-Holstein; had issue
Princess Louise	18 March 1848	3 December 1939	married 1871, John Campbell, Marquess of Lorne, later 9th Duke of Argyll; no issue
Prince Arthur, Duke of Connaught and Strathearn	1 May 1850	16 January 1942	married 1879, Princess Louise Margaret of Prussia; had issue
Prince Leopold, Duke of Albany	7 April 1853	28 March 1884	married 1882, Princess Helena of Waldeck and Pyrmont; had issue
Princess Beatrice	14 April 1857	26 October 1944	married 1885, Prince Henry of Battenberg; had issue

Prince Albert's 42 grandchildren included four reigning monarchs: King George V of the United Kingdom; Wilhelm II, German Emperor; Ernest Louis, Grand Duke of Hesse; and Charles Edward, Duke of Saxe-Coburg and Gotha, and five consorts of monarchs: Empress Alexandra of Russia and Queens Maud of Norway, Sophia of Greece, Victoria Eugenie of Spain, and Marie of Romania. Albert's many descendants include royalty and nobility throughout Europe.

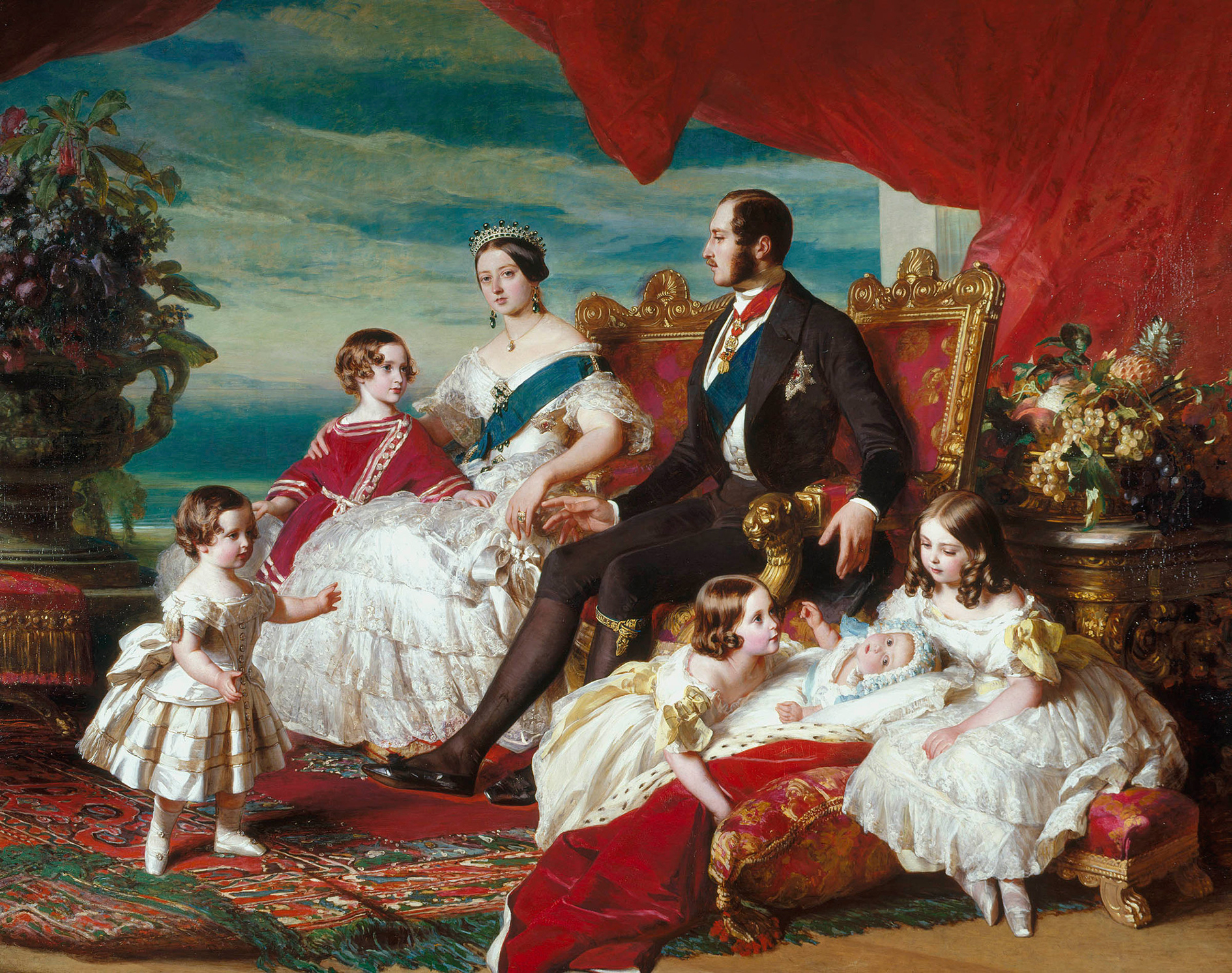
Victoria and Albert's family in 1846 by Franz Xaver Winterhalter. Left to right: Prince Alfred (unbreeched at two years); the Prince of Wales; the Queen; Prince Albert; and Princesses Alice, Helena and Victoria

== Ancestry ==
Ancestors of Prince Albert of Saxe-Coburg and Gotha

8. Ernest Frederick, Duke of Saxe-Coburg-Saalfeld
4. Francis, Duke of Saxe-Coburg-Saalfeld
9. Princess Sophie Antoinette of Brunswick-Wolfenbüttel
2. Ernest I, Duke of Saxe-Coburg and Gotha
10. Heinrich XXIV, Count Reuss of Ebersdorf
5. Countess Augusta Reuss of Ebersdorf
11. Countess Karoline Ernestine of Erbach-Schönberg
1. Prince Albert of Saxe-Coburg and Gotha
12. Ernest II, Duke of Saxe-Gotha-Altenburg
6. Augustus, Duke of Saxe-Gotha-Altenburg
13. Princess Charlotte of Saxe-Meiningen
3. Princess Louise of Saxe-Gotha-Altenburg
14. Frederick Francis I, Grand Duke of Mecklenburg-Schwerin
7. Duchess Louise Charlotte of Mecklenburg-Schwerin
15. Princess Louise of Saxe-Gotha-Altenburg

== See also ==
- John Brown – Scottish servant and favourite of Queen Victoria
- List of coupled cousins – First cousin marriages
- Royal Albert Memorial Museum – Museum in Exeter, Devon, England

== Sources ==
- Abecasis-Phillips, John (2004). "Prince Albert and the Church – Royal versus Papal Supremacy in the Hampden Controversy". In Davis, John (ed.). Prinz Albert – Ein Wettiner in Großbritannien / Prince Albert – A Wettin in Great Britain. Munich: de Gruyter. pp. 95–110. ISBN 978-3-598-21422-6.
- Ames, Winslow (1968). Prince Albert and Victorian Taste. London: Chapman and Hall.
- Armstrong, Neil (2008). "England and German Christmas Festlichkeit, c. 1800–1914". German History. 26 (4): 486–503. doi:10.1093/gerhis/ghn047.
- Aveling, S. T.; Boutell, Charles (1890). Heraldry, Ancient and Modern: Including Boutell's Heraldry (2nd ed.). London and New York: Frederick Warne & Co.
- Cust, Lionel (1907). "The Royal Collection of Pictures". The Cornhill Magazine. New Series. XXII: 162–170.
- Darby, Elizabeth; Smith, Nicola (1983). The Cult of the Prince Consort. New Haven and London: Yale University Press. ISBN 978-0-300-03015-0.
- Finestone, Jeffrey (1981). The Last Courts of Europe. London: The Vendome Press. ISBN 978-0-86565-015-2.
- Fulford, Roger (1949). The Prince Consort. London: Macmillan Publishers.
- Hobhouse, Hermione (1983). Prince Albert: His Life and Work. London: Hamish Hamilton. ISBN 978-0-241-11142-0.
- Hough, Richard (1996). Victoria and Albert. London: St. Martin's Press. ISBN 978-0312148225.
- Jagow, Kurt, ed. (1938). The Letters of the Prince Consort, 1831–61. London: John Murray.
- Jurgensen, John (4 December 2009). "Victorian Romance: When the dour queen was young and in love". The Wall Street Journal.
- Knight, Chris (17 December 2009). "A Duchess, a reader and a man named Alistair". National Post.
- Louda, Jiří; Maclagan, Michael (1999) [1981]. Lines of Succession: Heraldry of the Royal Families of Europe (2nd ed.). London: Little, Brown. ISBN 978-0-316-84820-6.
- Martin, Theodore (1874–1880). The Life of H. R. H. the Prince Consort. 5 volumes, authorised by Queen Victoria.
- Montgomery-Massingberd, Hugh, ed. (1977). Burke's Royal Families of the World (1st ed.). London: Burke's Peerage. ISBN 978-0-85011-023-4.
- Murphy, James (2001). Abject Loyalty: Nationalism and Monarchy in Ireland During the Reign of Queen Victoria. Washington DC: Catholic University of America Press. ISBN 978-0-8132-1076-6.
- Pinches, John Harvey; Pinches, Rosemary (1974). Heraldry Today: The Royal Heraldry of England. Slough, Buckinghamshire: Hollen Street Press. ISBN 978-0-900455-25-4.
- Rhodes James, Robert (1983). Albert, Prince Consort: A Biography. New York: Knopf. ISBN 0-394-40763-6.
- Stewart, Jules (2012). Albert: A Life. London; New York: I.B. Tauris. ISBN 978-1-84885-977-7. OCLC 760284773.
- Weintraub, Stanley (1997). Albert: Uncrowned King. London: John Murray. ISBN 978-0-7195-5756-9.
- Weintraub, Stanley (2004). "Albert [Prince Albert of Saxe-Coburg and Gotha] (1819–1861)". Oxford Dictionary of National Biography (online, January 2008 ed.). Oxford University Press. doi:10.1093/ref:odnb/274. (subscription required)
- Weir, Alison (1996). Britain's Royal Families: The Complete Genealogy (Revised ed.). London: Random House. ISBN 978-0-7126-7448-5.

Prince Albert of Saxe-Coburg and Gotha House of Saxe-Coburg and Gotha Cadet branch of the House of Wettin Born: 26 August 1819 Died: 14 December 1861
British royalty
Vacant Title last held by Adelaide of Saxe-Meiningen as queen consort	Consort of the British monarch (created "Prince Consort" in 1857); 1840–1861	Vacant Title next held by Alexandra of Denmark as queen consort
Military offices
Preceded by Philip Philpot	Colonel of the 11th (Prince Albert's Own) Hussars; 1840–1842	Succeeded by Sir Arthur Benjamin Clifton
Preceded by George Ludlow, 3rd Earl Ludlow	Colonel of the Scots Fusilier Guards; 1842–1852	Succeeded by Prince George, Duke of Cambridge
Preceded by Arthur Wellesley, 1st Duke of Wellington	Colonel of the Grenadier Guards; 1852–1861	Succeeded by Prince George, Duke of Cambridge
Preceded by Arthur Wellesley, 1st Duke of Wellington	Colonel-in-Chief of the Rifle Brigade; 1852–1861	Succeeded by John Colborne, 1st Baron Seaton
Court offices
Preceded by Francis Seymour-Conway, 3rd Marquess of Hertford	Lord Warden of the Stannaries; 1842–1861	Succeeded by Henry Pelham-Clinton, 5th Duke of Newcastle-under-Lyne
Academic offices
Preceded by Hugh Percy, 3rd Duke of Northumberland	Chancellor of the University of Cambridge; 1847–1861	Succeeded by William Cavendish, 7th Duke of Devonshire
Honorary titles
Preceded by Prince Augustus Frederick, Duke of Sussex	Great Master of the Order of the Bath; 1847–1861; Acting 1843–1847	Vacant Title next held by Edward, Prince of Wales
