= Friedrich Christian Schlenkert =

Friedrich Christian Schlenkert (8 February 1757 - 16 June 1826) was a German writer.

== Life ==
Born in Dresden to a coachman, he attended the Kreuzschule in Dresden, then received private tuition in languages and then in 1771 moved to the Landesschule Pforta. He began studying theology at the University of Leipzig but more and more devoted himself to studying history and belles-lettres instead. Eventually he gave up theology and concentrated on belles-lettres only. His first writings dated to that time. However, his parents did not agree with his study plans and recalled him to Dresden in 1782.

Schlenkert had to find a job in Dresden, initially becoming an 'accessist' (young professional in administration or the judiciary) at the Generalaccis-Rechnungsexpedition and a year later an 'expediting secretary' at the Electorate of Saxony's newly established Geheimen Finanzcollegium. During this era he was still active as a writer - this probably had an impact on his 'day job' and (along with his writings' liberal tone) led to his dismissal from Saxony's civil service in 1791.

Schlenkert was initially able to support himself solely from his writings. After a time he moved to Tharandt, contributing to the beautifying of the place. When taxes were reformed in Saxony, he became a 'localexpedient' in Dippoldiswalde, but only hold the role for a short time until it became obsolete due to the War of the Sixth Coalition. He became professor of German language at the new Forstakademie Tharandt in 1815, holding it until his death in Tharandt in 1826.

== Selected works ==
- Agathon und Psiche: Ein Drama mit Gesang, Kummer Leipzig, 1780.
- Kaiser Heinrich der Vierte, 5 volumes, Dresden Leipzig, 1788–1795.
- Graf Wieprecht von Groitzsch, 3 volumes, 1789–1795.
- Altdeutsche Geschichten romantischen Inhalts, 1790.
- Rudolf von Habsburg, 4 volumes, Leipzig, 1792–1794.
- Tharand; ein histor.-romant. Gemälde, nach der Natur, Urkunden und Sagen bearbeitet, 1797.

== Bibliography ==
- (in German) Franz Brümmer (1890). "Schlenkert, Friedrich Christian" . Allgemeine Deutsche Biographie (in German). Vol. 31. Leipzig: Duncker & Humblot. p. 464.
- (in German) Edmund Goetze: Grundriss zur Geschichte der deutschen Dichtung. Aus den Quellen von Karl Goedeke, Band 5, Akademie-Verlag, Berlin 2011, ISBN 978-3-05-005224-3, S. 495.
- Patrick Bridgewater: The German Gothic Novel in Anglo-German Perspective, Rodopi, Amsterdam und New York 2013, ISBN 978-9-4012-0992-2, S. 264–266.
