= Bernhard Friedrich Voigt =

German publisher (1787–1859)

Bernhard Friedrich Voigt (5 July 1787, in Weimar – 17 February 1859, in Weimar) was a German publisher, who served as the court publisher for Günther Friedrich Karl I, Prince of Schwarzburg-Sondershausen, and was the recipient of the Order of the White Falcon and the General Honor Decoration.
