= Household of George V and Mary =

Departments of the British royal family

The Households of George V and Mary supported the work of the monarch and his consort between May 1910 and January 1936. Previously, they had maintained separate Households as Prince and Princess of Wales (1901-1910) and a joint Household as Duke and Duchess of York (1893-1901). After the death of her husband, Queen Mary maintained her own Household until her death in 1953. The Royal Households of the United Kingdom consist of royal officials, office-holders and staff; members of the Royal Family who undertake public duties each have their own (separate or joint) Households.

Prince George of Wales (1865–1936), the future King George V, was born the second son of the then Prince and Princess of Wales (the future King Edward VII and Queen Alexandra). On the death of his elder brother in January 1892, however, he became second in line to the throne. The following month, he made the first appointments to his household: a Comptroller and Treasurer and a Chaplain; later that year he was created Duke of York. After his marriage to Princess Mary of Teck (1867–1953) in 1893, the couple maintained a shared household: the Household of the Duke and Duchess of York.

On the accession of his father, King Edward VII in January 1901, George automatically inherited the dukedom of Cornwall and was known as the Duke of Cornwall and York until the following November, when he was appointed Prince of Wales. From that time on, he and his wife each had their own household: the Household of the Prince of Wales and the Household of the Princess of Wales.

When George became King in 1910, his household became the Household of the Sovereign and was duly extended. As consort, Mary had her own household, the Household of the Queen.

Prior to 1922, the king had maintained a separate Household in Ireland, latterly consisting of two hereditary officers and a small medical establishment (along with the Office of Arms and Chancery of the Order of St Patrick); it was dissolved following the establishment of the Irish Free State in December of that year.

In 1924, following the formation of Britain's first Labour government, the number of political appointments in the Royal Household was reduced (by mutual agreement between the King and Ramsay MacDonald, after consultation with Lord Balfour and Mr Asquith). Thus in February 1924, the appointments of the Lord Steward, Lord Chamberlain, Master of the Horse, two Lords in Waiting, the Captain of the Honourable Corps of Gentlemen-at-Arms and the Captain of the Yeomen of the Guard were gazetted, with the proviso that 'these Appointments will be of a non-political character during the present Administration'. The latter two subsequently reverted to being political appointments, but the others remained non-political.

King George V died in 1936, and was succeeded by his son Edward VIII. His widow retained her household (retitled the Household of Queen Mary) until her own demise in 1953.

== Household of the Duke of York 1892–1893 and Household of the Duke and Duchess of York 1893–1901 ==
=== Controller and Treasurer to His Royal Highness ===
- 1892–1901: Major General Sir Francis de Winton

=== Equerries in Waiting to His Royal Highness ===
- 1892–1901: Lieut. Sir Charles Leopold Cust, Bart.
- 1893–1901: Capt. the Hon. Derek William George Keppel

=== Ladies in Waiting to Her Royal Highness ===
- 1893–1901: Lady Eva Greville (afterwards Dugdale)
- 1895–1901: Lady Mary Lygon
- 1898–1901: Lady Katherine Grey Coke (Extra)

=== Physician Accoucheur to Her Royal Highness ===
- 1896–1901: Sir John Williams, Bt.

=== Physician in Ordinary to His Royal Highness ===
- 1896–1901: Robert W. Burnet

=== Surgeon in Ordinary to His Royal Highness ===
- 1897–1901: Frederick Treves, Esq.

=== Surgeon Apothecary to His Royal Highness, at Sandringham ===
- 1897–1901: Alan Reeve Manby

=== Hon. Chaplain to His Royal Highness ===
- 1892–1901: John Neale Dalton

== Household of the Prince of Wales 1901–1910 ==
=== Lords of the Bedchamber to His Royal Highness ===
- 1901–1910: Beilby Lawley, 3rd Baron Wenlock
- 1901–1907: Charles Cavendish, 3rd Baron Chesham
- 1908–1910: Luke White, 3rd Baron Annaly

=== Comptroller and Treasurer ===
- 1901–1910: Lt-Col. Sir William Carington

=== Private Secretary to His Royal Highness ===
- 1901–1910: Lt-Col. Sir Arthur Bigge (later Baron Stamfordham)

=== Master of the Stables ===
- 1901–1910: Capt. William Charles Wentworth-FitzWilliam

=== Groom of the Bedchamber to His Royal Highness ===
- 1903–1910: Edward Wallington, Esq.

=== Equerries in Ordinary to His Royal Highness ===
- 1901–1910: Cdr Sir Charles Cust, 3rd Baronet, Royal Navy
- 1901–1910: The Hon. Derek W. G. Keppel
- 1901–1909: Capt. the Viscount Crichton
- 1901–1910: Capt. Bryan Godfrey-Faussett, Royal Navy
- 1909–1910: Capt. the Lord Charles George Francis FitzMaurice

==== Extra Equerries to His Royal Highness ====
- 1901–1910: Capt. Rosslyn Erskine-Wemyss, Royal Navy
- 1901–1910: Maj. James Bor, Royal Marine Artillery
- 1901–1910: Capt. William Charles Wentworth-FitzWilliam
- 1906–1910: Maj.-Gen. Sir Stuart Brownlow Beatson
- 1906–1910: Maj. Rollo Estouteville Grimston
- 1906–1910: Maj. Charles Ferguson Campbell
- 1906–1910: Maj. Harry Davis Watson
- 1906–1910: Brevet Maj. Clive Wigram
- 1909–1910: Capt. the Viscount Crichton

=== Domestic Chaplain ===
- 1901–1910: Canon John Neale Dalton

=== Librarian to His Royal Highness ===
- 1903–: Mr G. Hua

=== Physicians in Ordinary ===
- 1901–1907: Sir William H. Broadbent, Bart
- 1901–1910:Sir James Reid, Bart
- 1901–1910: Sir Francis H. Laking
- 1906–1910: Sir Richard Havelock Charles

=== Surgeons in Ordinary ===
- 1901–1910: Sir Frederick Treves
- 1901–1904: H. W. Allingham, Esq.
- 1905–1910: Hugh Mallison Rigby, Esq.

=== Honorary Physicians ===
- 1901–1910: Robert W. Burnet, Esq.
- 1901–1910: Samuel J. Gee, Esq.

=== Surgeon-Apothecary to His Royal Highness the Prince of Wales's Household ===
- 1901–1910: Sir Francis H. Laking

=== Surgeon-Apothecary to His Royal Highness the Prince of Wales, and to the Household at Sandringham ===
- 1901–1910: Alan R. Manby, Esq.

=== Chemist and Druggist ===
- 1901–1910: Mr. Peter Wyatt Squire

== Household of the Princess of Wales 1901–1910 ==
=== Chamberlain ===
- 1901–1910: Anthony Ashley-Cooper, 9th Earl of Shaftesbury

=== Ladies of the Bedchamber to Her Royal Highness ===
- 1901–1910: Mabell Ogilvy, Countess of Airlie
- 1901–1902: Ida Bridgeman, Countess of Bradford (Extra from 1905)
- 1902–1910: Mary Cochrane-Baillie, Baroness Lamington
- 1906–1910: Constance Ashley-Cooper, Countess of Shaftesbury

==== Extra Ladies of the Bedchamber to Her Royal Highness ====
- 1905–1910: Ida Bridgeman, Countess of Bradford
- 1905–1906: Constance Ashley-Cooper, Countess of Shaftesbury

=== Women of the Bedchamber to Her Royal Highness ===
- 1901–1910: Lady Eva Dugdale
- 1901–1910: Lady Mary Lygon (later Forbes-Trefusis)
- 1907–1910: Lady Bertha Dawkins

==== Extra Woman of the Bedchamber Her Royal Highness ====
- 1901–1910: Lady Katharine Coke

=== Private Secretary to the Princess of Wales ===
- 1901–1910: Alexander Hood

=== Equerry to the Princess of Wales ===
- 1901–1910: Frank Dugdale

== Household of King George V 1910–1936 ==
The headings below broadly reflect the King's Household as announced in June 1910; however, in 1920 a number of changes were made to the arrangement of departments and officers in the King's Household. The Lord Steward's Department and the Master of the Horse's Department were renamed (after their executive heads), becoming the Master of the Household's Department and the Crown Equerry's Department, respectively. The Keeper of the Privy Purse was retitled Treasurer to the King and Keeper of the Privy Purse (with oversight of a distinct Treasurer's office alongside that of the Privy Purse). The king's Equerries in Waiting, who had always (for historical reasons) been part of the Master of the Horse's department, were transferred to the Private Secretary's office. Also, as part of these rearrangements, the Lord Chamberlain's Department was split: a smaller Lord Chamberlain's Office (headed by a 'State Chamberlain') moved into Buckingham Palace, while the 'Ceremonial Department' remained at St James's Palace (under its own separate Comptroller); this arrangement, however, was short lived, with the two being reunited under a single Comptroller of the Lord Chamberlain's Office by 1925.

=== Personal appointments ===
==== Keeper of His Majesty's Privy Purse ====
- 1910–1914: Lt-Col. The Hon. Sir William Henry Peregrine Carington
- 1914–1935: Lt-Col. Sir Frederick Edward Grey Ponsonby (Treasurer to the King and Keeper of the Privy Purse from 1920)
- 1935–1936: Col. the Rt Hon. Clive, Baron Wigram (Private Secretary to the King and Keeper of His Majesty's Privy Purse)

===== Secretary of His Majesty's Privy Purse =====
- 1910–1918: Walter Matthew Gibson, Esq.
- 1918–1923: Paymaster Rear-Adm. Sir John Henry George Chapple (Assistant Treasurer to The King and Secretary of the Privy Purse from 1920)
- 1923–1932: Paymaster-Captain Philip John Hawkins Lander Row
- 1932–1936: Paymaster-Commander Ernest Dudley Gordon Colles

===== Deputy Treasurer to His Majesty =====
- 1923–1936: Ralph Endersby Harwood, Esq. (Financial Secretary to the King from 1935)

==== Private Secretaries to His Majesty ====
- 1910–1913: The Lord Knollys
- 1910–1931: Lt-Col. Sir Arthur John Bigge
- 1931–1936: Col. Sir Clive Wigram (also Keeper of His Majesty's Privy Purse from 1935)

===== Assistant Private Secretaries to His Majesty =====
- 1910–1914: Lt-Col. Frederick Edward Grey Ponsonby
- 1910–1931: Brevet Maj. Clive Wigram
- 1916–1920: Rowland Thomas Baring, The Viscount Errington (later Earl of Cromer)
- 1920–1936: Lt the Hon. Alexander Henry Louis Hardinge (also Assistant Keeper of His Majesty's Privy Purse from 1935)
- 1931–1936: Frank Herbert Mitchell, Esq.
- 1935–1936: Alan Frederick Lascelles, Esq.

=== Lord Steward's Department ===
(Board of Green Cloth, Buckingham Palace)

==== Lord Steward of His Majesty's Household ====
- May–June 1910: William, Earl Beauchamp
- 1910–1915: Edwyn Francis, Earl of Chesterfield
- 1915–1922: Horace Farquhar, 1st Viscount Farquhar (later Earl Farquhar)
- 1922–1936: Anthony Ashley-Cooper, 9th Earl of Shaftesbury

==== Master of His Majesty's Household ====
- 1910–1912: Lieutenant-Colonel Sir Charles Arthur Frederick
- 1913–1936: The Hon. Sir Derek William George Keppel

===== Deputy Master of His Majesty's Household =====
- 1910–1911: Harry Lloyd Verney, Esq.
- 1913–1914: Captain the Lord Arthur John Hamilton
- 1918–1921: the Hon. Henry Julian Stonor
- 1921–1924: Lord Claud Nigel Hamilton
- 1929–1936: Brigadier General Sir Smith Hill Child, Bt.

==== Gentleman of the Cellars to His Majesty ====
- 1910–1919: Thomas Arthur FitzHardinge Kingscote, Esq.
- 1919–1922: Major Edric Thomas Kingscote

==== Coroner to His Majesty's Household ====
- 1910–1934: Arthur Walter Mills, Esq.
- 1934–1936: Lt-Col. William Hilgrove Leslie McCarthy

==== Paymaster of the Household ====
- 1910: Lt-Col. The Right Hon. Sir Fleetwood Isham Edwards
- 1911–1915: the Hon. Sidney Robert Greville
- 1915–1924: Col. the Hon. Sir Harry Legge

=== Lord Chamberlain's Department ===
(Lord Chamberlain's Office, Stable Yard, St James's Palace)

==== Lord Chamberlain ====
- 1910–1912: Charles Spencer, 6th Earl Spencer (Viscount Althorp until August 1910)
- 1912–1921: William Mansfield, 1st Viscount Sandhurst
- 1921–1922: John Stewart-Murray, 8th Duke of Atholl
- 1922–1936: Rowland Baring, 2nd Earl of Cromer

==== State Chamberlain ====
- 1920–1924: Brig.-Gen. Sir Douglas Frederick Rawdon Dawson

==== Comptroller, Lord Chamberlain's Department ====
- 1910–1920: Col. Sir Douglas Frederick Rawdon Dawson
- 1920–1936: Maj. The Hon. George Arthur Charles Crichton (Comptroller of the Ceremonial Department, 1920–1925; Comptroller, the Lord Chamberlain's Office 1925–1936)

===== Assistant Comptroller of the Lord Chamberlain's Department =====
- 1910–1920: Maj. The Hon. George Arthur Charles Crichton
- 1925–1936: Major Colin Lindsay Gordon

==== Lords in Waiting in Ordinary to His Majesty ====
- 1910–1921: Luke, 3rd Lord Annaly (Lord of the Bedchamber in Waiting) (Permanent)
- 1910–1915: Granville George, Earl Granville
- 1910–1911: Gavin George, Lord Hamilton of Dalzell
- 1910–1915: Richard Maximilian, Lord Acton
- 1910–1911: Edward Arthur, Lord Colebrooke
- 1910–1919: Richard Farrer, Lord Herschell
- 1910–1911: Dudley Churchill, Lord Tweedmouth
- 1911–1913: Freeman, Lord Willingdon
- 1911–1916: Wentworth Canning Blackett, Viscount Allendale
- 1911–1914: Edward Douglas, Lord Loch
- 1913–1915: Ivor Churchill, Baron Ashby St. Ledgers
- 1914–1922: George Arthur Maurice, Baron Stanmore
- 1915–1921: Major-General John Fielden, Baron Ranksborough
- 1915–1918: Hylton George Hylton, Baron Hylton
- 1915–1924: Arthur, Viscount Valentia
- 1916–1919: Lloyd, Baron Kenyon
- 1918–1924: Savile Brinton, Baron Somerleyton
- 1919: George Henry Robert Child, Earl of Jersey
- 1919–1924: Orlando, Earl of Bradford
- 1919–1920: Richard William Alan, Earl of Onslow
- 1920–1924: George Charles, Earl of Lucan
- 1921–1922: George Herbert Hyde, Earl of Clarendon
- 1922–1924: James Edward, Earl of Malmesbury
- 1922–1924: Arnold Allan Cecil, Earl of Albemarle
- 1924: Kenneth Augustus, Baron Muir Mackenzie
- 1924: Herbrand Edward Dundonald Brassey, Earl De La Warr
- 1924–1936: Thomas Walter, Viscount Hampden (non-political)
- 1924–1936: Edward Arthur, Baron Colebrooke (non-political)
- 1924–1929: Richard Farrer, Baron Herschell (non-political)
- 1924–1929: George Charles, Earl of Lucan
- 1924–1929: Henry Rainald, Viscount Gage
- 1924–1926: Arthur Herbert Tennyson, Baron Somers
- 1926–1929: David Lyulph Gore Wolseley, Earl of Airlie
- 1929: Arthur Claud Spencer, Baron Templemore
- 1929–1930: Kenneth Augustus, Baron Muir Mackenzie
- 1929–1931: Herbrand Edward Dundonald Brassey, Earl De La Warr
- 1930–1931: Dudley Leigh, Baron Marley
- 1930–1936: Alexander Edward, Earl of Dunmore (non-political)
- 1931–1934: Arthur Claud Spencer, Baron Templemore
- 1931–1936: Henry Rainald, Viscount Gage
- 1931–1932: Wentworth Henry Canning, Viscount Allendale
- 1932–1936: Geoffrey William Richard Hugh, Earl of Munster
- 1934–1936: Charles William Slingsby, Earl of Feversham

===== Extra Lord in Waiting =====
- 1910–1915: Horace Brand, Lord Farquhar

==== Master of the Ceremonies ====
- 1910–1920: The Hon. Arthur Henry John Walsh

Renamed Marshal of the Diplomatic Corps in 1920

- 1920–1934: Sir John Hanbury-Williams
- 1934–1936: Lt-Gen. Sir George Sidney Clive

===== Marshal of the Ceremonies =====
- 1910–1913: The Honourable Richard Charles Moreton
- 1913–1933: Charles Hubert Montgomery, Esq. (Vice-Marshal of the Diplomatic Corps from 1920)

===== Assistant Marshals of the Diplomatic Corps =====
- 1920–1936: John Berkeley Monck, Esq.
- 1933–1936: Captain Sir John Lindsay Dashwood, Bt.

==== Gentlemen Ushers ====
- 1910–1915: The Rt Hon. Sir Spencer Cecil Brabazon Ponsonby-Fane
- 1910–1925: Maj. the Hon. Arthur Hay
- 1910–1911: Capt. the Hon. Otway Frederick Seymour Cuffe
- 1910–1936: The Hon. Henry Julian Stonor
- 1910–1912: Lt-Col. Arthur Collins
- 1910–1928: Lionel Henry Cust, Esq.
- 1910–1919: Henry David Erskine, Esq. (Gentleman Usher to the Robes)
- 1910–1919: Arnold Royle, Esq.
- 1910–1913: Maj.-Gen. Sir John Ramsay Slade
- 1910–1919: Brook Taylor, Esq.
- 1910–1925: Horace Charles George West, Esq.
- 1910–1927: Percy Armytage, Esq.
- 1910–1916: Rear-Adm. Charles Windham
- 1910–1919: Thomas Kingscote, Esq.
- 1910–1919: Capt. Gerald Montagu Augustus Ellis
- 1910–1919: Col. Henry Fludyer
- 1910–1911: Captain the Hon. Seymour John Fortescue
- 1910 (Honorary), 1911–1924: Colonel Lord William Cecil
- 1911–1936: Montague Charles Eliot, Esq.
- 1912–1927: Maj. John Chaytor Brinton
- 1913–1915: Col. William Leslie Davidson
- 1915–1936: Captain Charles Alexander Lindsay Irvine
- 1919–1936: Rear-Adm. Philip Nelson-Ward
- 1919–1922: Capt. the Hon. Charles Joseph Thaddeus Dormer
- 1919–1932: Capt. Edmund Moore Cooper Cooper-Key
- 1919–1936: Brig.-Gen. Gerald Frederic Trotter
- 1919–1927: Brig.-Gen. Montagu Grant Wilkinson
- 1919–1931: Maj. Berkeley John Talbot Levett
- 1919–1928: Henry Peter Hansell, Esq.
- 1922–1934: Paymaster Rear-Admiral Sir Hamnet Holditch Share
- 1924–1936: Wing Cdr Louis Greig
- 1925–1936: Edmund Vivian Gabriel, Esq.
- 1925–1936: Captain Humphrey Clifford Lloyd
- 1927–1936: Lt-Col. Henry Valentine Bache de Satgé
- 1927–1936: Brig.-Gen. Sir Smith Hill Child, Bart.
- 1927–1936: Rear-Adm. Arthur Bromley
- 1928–1936: Col. the Hon. George Sidney Herbert
- 1928–1936: Lt-Col. Sir Arthur D'Arcy Gordon Bannerman
- 1931–1936: John Coldbrook Hanbury-Williams, Esq.
- 1932–1936: Maj. John Lamplugh Wickham
- 1934–1936: Lt-Col. Frederick Edward Packe

===== Gentleman Usher of the Black Rod =====
- 1910–1919: Adm. Sir Henry Frederick Stephenson
- 1920–1936: Lt-Gen. Sir William Pulteney Pulteney

===== Gentleman Usher to the Sword of State =====
- 1910–1919: The Rt Hon. Sir Spencer Cecil Brabazon Ponsonby-Fane
- 1919–1924: The Rt Hon. Sir William Edward Goschen, Bart
- 1924–1933: Sir Reginald Herbert Brade
- 1933–1936: Gen. Sir Lewis Stratford Tollemache Halliday

===== Extra Gentlemen Ushers =====
- 1919–1923: Brook Taylor, Esq.
- 1919–1936: Thomas Arthur Fitzhardinge Kingscote, Esq.
- 1919–1936: Maj. Gerald Montagu Augustus Ellis
- 1919–1920: Col. Henry Fludyer
- 1919–1921: Sir Henry David Erskine
- 1924–1936: Col. Lord William Cecil
- 1925–1932 Maj. the Hon. Arthur Hay
- 1927–1936: Brig.-Gen. Montagu Grant Wilkinson
- 1927–1934: Percy Armytage, Esq.
- 1928–1929: Lionel Henry Cust, Esq.
- 1928–1936: Henry Peter Hansell, Esq.
- 1931–1936: Maj. Berkeley John Talbot Levett
- 1932–1933: Capt. Edmund Moore Cooper Cooper-Key
- 1934–1936: Paymaster Rear-Admiral Sir Hamnet Holditch Share

==== Sergeants-at-Arms ====
- 1910–1921: Richard Edgcumbe, Esq.
- 1910–1914: Edward Hamilton Anson, Esq.
- 1910–1912: Capt. Sir William Goldsmith, R.N.
- 1910–1911: Sir Richard Rivington Holmes
- 1910–1929: Maj. James Evan Baillie Martin
- 1910–1936: Capt. Ernest Beachcroft Beckwith Towse
- 1914–1916: Capt. George Alexander Broad, R.N.
- 1916–1926: Walter Matthew Gibson, Esq.
- 1921–1922: Sir Daniel Alfred Anley Tupper
- 1922–1931: Sir Francis Morgan Bryant
- 1926–1935: Harry Clifford Longden, Esq.
- 1929–1936: Frederic Stanley Osgood, Esq.
- 1931–1936: Maj. Henry Hudson Fraser Stockley
- 1935–1936: George David Field, Esq.

===== Sergeant-at-Arms, House of Lords =====
- 1910: Maj.-Gen. Sir Stanley de Astel Clarke
- 1910–1936: Capt. the Hon. Sir Seymour John Fortescue

===== Sergeant-at-Arms, House of Commons =====
- 1910–1915: Henry David Erskine, Esq.
- 1915–1935: Vice-Adm. Sir Colin Richard Keppel
- 1935–1936: Brig. Charles Alfred Howard

==== Grooms of the Bedchamber in Waiting to His Majesty ====
- 1910–1916: Capt. Walter Douglas Somerset Campbell
- 1910–1911: Capt. the Hon. Seymour John Fortescue
- 1910–1917: Cdr Charles Elphinstone Fleeming Cunninghame Graham
- 1910–1911: The Hon. Sidney Robert Greville
- 1910–1936: Col. the Hon. William Lambton
- 1910–1936: The Hon. Henry Julian Stonor
- 1910–1932: Edward William Wallington, Esq.
- 1911–1931: Harry Lloyd Verney, Esq
- 1911–1936: Capt. Philip Hunloke
- 1916–1932: Col. the Hon. Claude Henry Comaraich Willoughby
- 1917–1933: Rear-Adm. Henry Hervey Campbell
- 1919–1936: Maj. the Hon. Richard Frederick Molyneux
- 1920–1927: The Hon. Sir Sidney Robert Greville
- 1931–1936: the Hon. Gerald Henry Crofton Chichester
- 1932–1936: Col. Sir Victor Audley Falconer Mackenzie, Bt.
- 1932–1936: Adm. Sir Henry Tritton Buller
- 1933–1936: Brig. Gen. George Camborne Beauclerk Paynter

===== Extra Grooms of the Bedchamber in Waiting to His Majesty =====
- 1910–1918: Adm. Sir John Reginald Thomas Fullerton
- 1910–1919: Sir Donald Mackenzie Wallace
- 1916–1919: Sir Walter Douglas Somerset Campbell
- 1924–1936: The Hon. Montague Charles Eliot
- 1931–1936: Sir Harry Lloyd Verney

==== Librarian to His Majesty at Windsor Castle ====
- 1910–1926: The Hon. John William Fortescue
- 1926–1936: Owen Frederick Morshead, Esq

==== Surveyor of The King's Pictures and Works of Art ====
- 1910–1928: Lionel Henry Cust, Esq.

===== Surveyor of His Majesty's Pictures =====
- 1928–1934: Charles Henry Collins Baker, Esq.
- 1934–1936: Kenneth McKenzie Clark, Esq.

===== Surveyor of His Majesty's Works of Art =====
- 1928–1936: Sir Cecil Harcourt-Smith

==== Keeper of The King's Armoury ====
- 1910–1919: Guy Francis Laking, Esq.
- 1920–1928: Frederick Arthur Harman Oates, Esq

No further appointments were made after 1928; the duties of the post devolved upon the Surveyor of His Majesty's Works of Art.

==== Master of the Music in Ordinary to His Majesty ====
- 1910–1924: Sir Walter Parratt
- 1924–1934: Sir Edward Elgar
- 1934–1936: Sir Henry Walford Davies

==== Poet Laureate ====
- 1910–1913: Alfred Austin, Esq.
- 1913–1930: Robert Bridges, Esq.
- 1930–1936: John Masefield, Esq.

==== Marine Painter in Ordinary to the King ====
- 1910–1912: Edward de Martino, Esq.

==== Constable and Governor of Windsor Castle ====
- 1910–1914: John Douglas Sutherland, Duke of Argyll
- 1914–1927: Lt-Col. His Highness the Duke of Teck (afterwards Marquess of Cambridge)
- 1928–1931: the Rt Hon. Reginald Baliol, Viscount Esher
- 1931–1936: Maj.-Gen. the Rt Hon. Alexander Augustus Frederick William Alfred George, Earl of Athlone

===== Deputy Constable and Lieutenant-Governor of Windsor Castle =====
- 1910–1928: Reginald Baliol, Viscount Esher
- 1928–1936: The Rt Hon. Sir Frederick Edward Grey Ponsonby

==== Keeper of the Jewel House, Tower of London ====
- 1910–1911: Gen. Sir Robert Cunliffe Low
- 1911–1917: Gen. Sir Arthur Singleton Wynne
- 1917–1936: Maj.-Gen. Sir George John Younghusband

==== Keeper of the Cottage, Virginia Water ====
- 1910–1912: Capt. Sir David Nairne Welch
- 1912–1917: Capt. George Alexander Broad

Redesignated 'Keeper of Virginia Water' from 1919

- 1919–1925: Paymaster Rear-Adm. Sir John Henry George Chapple
- 1925–1936: Paymaster Rear-Adm. Henry Horniman

=== Master of the Horse's Department ===
(Royal Mews, Buckingham Palace)

==== His Majesty's Master of the Horse ====
- 1910–1915: Bernard Forbes, 8th Earl of Granard
- 1915–1922: Edwyn Scudamore-Stanhope, 10th Earl of Chesterfield
- 1922–1924: Thomas Thynne, 5th Marquess of Bath
- 1924–1936: Bernard Forbes, 8th Earl of Granard

==== Crown Equerry to His Majesty ====
- 1910: Maj.-Gen. Sir Henry Ewart, Bart.
- 1910–1924: Capt. Sir William Charles Wentworth-FitzWilliam
- 1924–1936: Lt-Col. Arthur Erskine

==== Honorary Equerry to His Majesty ====
- 1910–1918: Hon. General The Duke of Grafton

==== Equerries in Ordinary to His Majesty ====
- 1910—1931: Cdr Sir Charles Leopold Cust, Bart.
- 1910–1913: The Hon. Derek William George Keppel
- 1910–1915: Col. The Hon. Henry Charles Legge
- 1910–1914: Lt-Col. Frederick Edward Grey Ponsonby
- 1910–1936: Capt. Bryan Godfrey Godfrey-Faussett, RN
- 1910–1914: Capt. The Lord Charles George Francis Petty Fitzmaurice
- 1910–1931: Brevet Maj. Clive Wigram
- 1913–1915: Rear Adm. Sir Colin Richard Keppel
- 1916–1936: Maj. Reginald Henry Seymour
- 1916–1920: Rowland Thomas Baring, The Viscount Errington (later Earl of Cromer)
- 1919–1924: Lt-Col. Arthur Erskine
- 1920–1936: Lt the Hon. Alexander Henry Louis Hardinge
- 1924–1936: Capt. Lord Claud Nigel Hamilton
- 1927–1930: Col. George Camborne Beauclerk Paynter
- 1930–1936: Lt-Col. Lord Alastair Robert Innes-Ker

===== Extra Equerries to His Majesty =====
- 1910–1914: Maj.-Gen. Sir Stuart Brownlow Beatson
- 1910–1922: The Lord Marcus Talbot de la Poer Beresford
- 1910–1931: Lt-Col. Sir Arthur John Bigge
- 1910–1914: Col. James Henry Bor
- 1910–1911: Col. Sir Edward Ridley Coleborne Bradford, Bart.
- 1910–1925: Lt-Col. Charles Ferguson Campbell
- 1910–1914: Lt-Col. The Hon. Sir William Henry Peregrine Carington
- 1910–1911: Maj.-Gen. Sir Stanley de Aste Calvert Clarke
- 1910–1914: Capt. The Viscount Crichton
- 1910–1922: Col. Sir Arthur Davidson
- 1910–1925: Lt-Col. Frank Dugdale
- 1910: Lt-Col. The Rt Hon. Sir Fleetwood Isham Edwards
- 1910–1928: Major-General Sir Henry Peter Ewart, Bart.
- 1910–1925: Capt. The Hon. William Charles Wentworth-FitzWilliam
- 1910–1936: Capt. The Hon. Seymour John Fortescue
- 1910–1913: Lt-Col. Sir Charles Arthur Andrew Frederick
- 1910–1936: Col. Albert Edward Wilfred, Count Gleichen
- 1910–1916: Lt-Col. Rollo Estouteville Grimston
- 1910–1929: Lt-Col. The Hon. Alwyn Henry Fulke Greville
- 1910–1926: Lt-Col. George Lindsay Holford
- 1910–1913, 1915-1936: Rear-Adm. Sir Colin Richard Keppel
- 1910–1929: Vice-Adm. The Hon. Sir Hedworth Lambton
- 1910–1936: Vice-Adm. Sir Archibald Berkeley Milne, Bart.
- 1910–1924: Gen. The Rt Hon. Sir Dighton Macnaghten Probyn
- 1910–1919: Adm. Sir Henry Frederick Stephenson
- 1910–1936: Col. Henry Streatfeild
- 1910–1936: The Hon. John Hubert Ward
- 1910–1936: Lt-Col. Harry Davis Watson
- 1910–1933: Capt. Rosslyn Erskine Wemyss
- 1910–1925: Lt-Col. Arthur Balfour Haig
- 1911–1931: Sir Edward Richard Henry (Commissioner of Police)#
- 1913–1936: The Hon. Derek William George Keppel
- 1914–1936: Lt-Col. Sir Frederick Edward Grey Ponsonby
- 1915–1924: Col. the Hon. Sir Harry Legge
- 1920–1933: Brig.-Gen. Sir Douglas Frederick Rawdon Dawson
- 1922–1936: Rear-Adm. the Hon. Sir Hubert George Brand
- 1922–1924: Capt. Lord Claud Nigel Hamilton
- 1923–1931: Maj. Frederick Howard Wingfield Fetherstonhaugh
- 1930–1936: Brig.-Gen. George Camborne Beauclerk Paynter
- 1931–1936: Adm. Sir Henry Tritton Buller
- 1931–1936: Col. Sir Clive Wigram
- 1932–1936: Brig. Henry Archdale Tomkinson
- 1934–1936: Maj.-Gen. Sir John Hanbury Williams
- 1934–1936: Adm. the Hon. Sir Herbert Meade-Fetherstonhaugh
- 1935–1936: Col. The Hon. Sir George Arthur Charles Crichton
- 1935–1936: Maj. Sir Edward Seymour

==== Superintendent of the Royal Mews, Buckingham Palace ====
- 1910–1912: Capt. John Nicholas
- 1913–1936: Capt. Andrew Benbow

==== Superintendent of the Royal Mews, Windsor Castle ====
- 1910–1924: Capt. Daniel Hickey
- 1924–1936: Ernest H. Lucking, Esq.

==== Honorary Veterinary Surgeon to His Majesty ====
- 1912–1936: Mr (later Sir) Frederick Hobday
- 1918–1936: Mr. John Willett

=== Medical Department ===
==== Physicians in Ordinary to His Majesty ====
- 1910–1914: Sir Francis Henry Laking, Bart.
- 1910–1923: Sir James Reid, Bart.
- 1910–1925: Sir Richard Douglas Powell, Bart.
- 1914–1936: Sir Bertrand Dawson
- 1923–1932: Sir Humphry Davy Rolleston
- 1932–1936: Sir Edward Farquhar Buzzard, Bt.

===== Physicians Extraordinary to His Majesty =====
- 1910–1936: Sir Thomas Barlow, Bart.
- 1910–1912: Sir William Henry Allchin
- 1910–1914: Bertrand Dawson, Esq.
- 1910–1925: Sir Alan Reeve Manby
- 1923–1932: Edward Farquhar Buzzard, Esq.
- 1932–1936: Sir Humphry Davy Rolleston, Bt.
- 1932–1936: Maurice Alan Cassidy, Esq.

===== Physician to His Majesty's Household =====
- 1910–1919: Sir Robert William Burnet
- 1919–1930: Herbert French, Esq.
- 1930–1932: Maurice Alan Cassidy, Esq.
- 1932–1936: John Alfred Ryle, Esq.

==== Sergeant-Surgeons to His Majesty ====
- 1910–1923: Sir Frederick Treves, Bart.
- 1910–1928: Sir Richard Havelock Charles
- 1928–1932: Sir Hugh Mallinson Rigby
- 1932–1936: Wilfred Trotter, Esq.

===== Honorary Sergeant-Surgeon to His Majesty =====
- 1928–1936: Sir Richard Havelock Charles

===== Honorary Surgeons in Ordinary to His Majesty =====
- 1910–1925: Rickman John Godlee
- 1910–1929: Anthony Alfred Bowlby
- 1910–1932: Sir William Watson Cheyne, Bart.
- 1910–1930: Sir Alfred Downing Fripp
- 1917–1928, 1932–1936: Sir Hugh Mallinson Rigby, Bt.
- 1928–1932: Wilfred Trotter, Esq.
- 1930–1936: Thomas Peel Dunhill, Esq.

===== Surgeon to His Majesty's Household =====
- 1910–1928: Hugh Mallinson Rigby, Esq.
- 1928–1930: Thomas Peel Dunhill, Esq.
- 1930–1936: Albert James Walton, Esq.

==== Surgeon Apothecary to His Majesty and to His Majesty's Household ====
- 1910–1914: Sir Francis Henry Laking, Bart.
- 1914–1936: Frederick Stanley Hewitt, Esq.

==== Surgeon-Oculist to His Majesty ====
- 1910–1925: Sir George Anderson Critchett, Bart.
- 1925–1936: Sir Richard Robert Cruise

===== Surgeon Oculist Extraordinary to His Majesty =====
- 1918–1925: Richard Robert Cruise, Esq.

===== Surgeon Oculist to His Majesty's Household =====
- 1919–1936: Col. William Tindall Lister

==== Laryngologist to His Majesty's Household ====
- 1910–1936: Milsom Rees, Esq.

==== Bacteriologist to His Majesty's Household ====
- 1910–1915: Harold Robert Dacre Spitta, Esq.

==== Surgeon-Dentist to His Majesty ====
- 1918–1926: Sir Harry Baldwin
- 1926–1936: Guy Capper Birt, Esq.

===== Honorary Surgeon-Dentist to His Majesty =====
- 1926–1931: Sir Harry Baldwin

===== Surgeon-Dentist to His Majesty's Household =====
- 1910–1924: Charles Edwin Truman, Esq.
- 1924–1936: Francis Desmond Donovan, Esq.

==== Anaesthetist to His Majesty ====
- 1910–1916: Frederick William Hewitt, Esq.

===== Anaesthetist to His Majesty's Household =====
- 1916–1932: Harold Low, Esq

==== Chemist and Druggist to His Majesty ====
- 1910–1919: Mr. Peter Wyatt Squire.

==== Surgeons-Apothecary to His Majesty's Household at Windsor ====
- 1910–1929: William Fairbank, Esq.
- 1910–1917: William A. Ellison, Esq.
- 1918–1936: Capt. Henry Linnington Martyn

==== Surgeon-Apothecary to His Majesty's Household at Sandringham ====
- 1910–1924: Sir Alan Reeve Manby
- 1924–1936: Frederick Jeune Willans, Esq.

==== Surgeon-Apothecary to His Majesty's Household at Balmoral ====
- 1910–1931: Alexander Hendry, Esq.
- 1932–1936: George Proctor Middleton, Esq.

==== Honorary Physicians in Ordinary to His Majesty in Scotland ====
- 1910–1920: Sir Thomas Richard Fraser, M.D.
- 1910–1923: David W. Finlay, Esq.
- 1920–1925: Sir James Mackenzie
- 1923–1936: Sir Robert William Philip
- 1925–1936: John Cowan, Esq
- 1928–1936: Ashley Watson Mackintosh, Esq.

==== Honorary Surgeons to His Majesty in Scotland ====
- 1910–1929: Alexander Ogston, Esq.
- 1910–1924: Sir William Macewen
- 1924–: Sir Harold Jalland Stiles
- 1928–1935: John Marnoch, Esq.
- 1928–1936: John Fraser, Esq.
- 1935–1936: James Rognvald Learmonth, Esq.

===== Extra Surgeon to His Majesty in Scotland =====
- 1935–1936: Sir John Marnoch

==== Honorary Surgeon-Oculist to His Majesty in Scotland ====
- 1910–: George Andreas Berry, Esq.
- 1928–1936: Arthur Havens Sinclair, Esq.

==== Honorary Surgeon-Dentist to His Majesty in Scotland ====
- 1922–1931: John Herbert Gibbs, Esq.
- 1931–1936: Leslie Charles Broughton-Head, Esq.

==== Surgeon Apothecary to His Majesty's Household at Holyrood Palace ====
- 1910–1923: William Black Alexander, Esq.
- 1923–1929: Lieutenant-Colonel David James Graham
- 1929–1930: William Macrae Taylor, Esq.
- 1930–1936: Norman Scott Carmichael, Esq.

==== Honorary Physicians in Ordinary to His Majesty in Ireland ====
- 1910–1912: Sir Francis Cruise
- 1910–1916: James Little, Esq.
- 1912–1922: Sir John William Moore
- 1917–1922: Sir William Whitla

==== Honorary Surgeons to His Majesty in Ireland ====
- 1910–1916: Sir Charles Bent Ball
- 1910–1922: Sir Thomas Myles
- 1916–1922: Charles Yelverton Pearson, Esq.

==== Honorary Surgeon Oculist to His Majesty in Ireland ====
- 1910–1916: Charles Edward Fitzgerald, Esq.
- 1916–1922: John B. Story, Esq.

=== Royal Almonry ===
==== High Almoner to His Majesty ====
- 1910–1933: the Very Reverend Joseph Armitage Robinson (Dean of Westminster)
- 1933–1936: the Most Reverend Cosmo Gordon Lang (Archbishop of Canterbury)

===== Sub-Almoner to His Majesty =====
- 1910–1921: The Reverend Canon Edgar Sheppard

=== College of Chaplains ===
==== Clerk of the King's Closet ====
- 1910–: The Bishop of Ripon (The Rt Revd William Boyd Carpenter)

===== Deputy Clerks of the Closet =====
- 1910–1921: The Reverend Canon Edgar Sheppard
- 1910–: The Reverend Canon John Neale Dalton

==== Chaplains in Ordinary ====
After 1918, appointees were gazetted as 'Chaplain to the King', there no longer being a distinction made between those formerly appointed as Chaplains in Ordinary and Honorary Chaplains.

- 1910–1911: The Reverend Canon Robinson Duckworth
- 1910–1911: The Reverend Canon T. Teignmouth Shore
- 1910: The Reverend Canon F. A. J. Hervey
- 1910–1936: The Reverend J. H. J. Ellison
- 1910–1921: The Reverend Canon Clement Smith
- 1910–1921: The Reverend Canon The Hon. L. F. Tyrwhitt
- 1910–1936: The Reverend F. A. S. Ffolkes
- 1910–1920: The Reverend Canon W. Sanday
- 1910–1929: The Reverend Mortimer Egerton Kennedy
- 1910–1911: The Reverend F. P. Farrar
- 1910–1918: The Reverend Canon Frederick B. Westcott
- 1910–1936: The Venerable Archdeacon H. S. Wood
- 1911–1918: The Reverend Henry Gee
- 1911–1921: The Reverend Canon Edward Russell Bernard
- 1912–1918: The Reverend Henry Montagu Butler
- 1912–1917: The Reverend Archibald Boyd Boyd-Carpenter
- 1917: The Reverend Canon Albert Victor Baillie
- 1918–1936: The Reverend Professor Alan England Brooke
- 1918–1920: The Reverend Andrew Ewbank Burn
- 1918–1919: The Venerable Archdeacon Ernest Harold Pearce
- 1918–1920: The Reverend Arthur William Thomson Perowne
- 1918–1936: The Reverend Travers Guy Rogers
- 1919–1933: The Reverend Clifford Salisbury Woodward
- 1919–1936: The Reverend Frederick Ingall Anderson
- 1920–1934: The Reverend Canon George Ernest Newsom
- 1920–1936: The Reverend Bertram Keir Cunningham
- 1920–1930: The Reverend Prebendary Herbert Priestley Cronshaw
- 1920–1929: The Reverend Geoffrey Anketell Studdert-Kennedy
- 1920–1934: The Reverend Harry William Blackburne
- 1920–1936: The Reverend Edward Keble Talbot
- 1920–1936: The Reverend Edward Mewburn Walker
- 1920–1936: The Reverend Charles Earle Raven
- 1921–1922: The Reverend Percy Mark Herbert
- 1921–1933: The Reverend Cyril Argentine Alington
- 1921–1935: The Venerable Archdeacon the Honourable Kenneth Francis Gibbs
- 1921–1936: The Reverend Thomas Heywood Masters
- 1921–1936: The Reverend Charles John Shebbeare
- 1921–1929: The Reverend Frederick Waldegrave Head
- 1922–1936: The Reverend Thomas Wentworth Pym
- 1922–1923: The Reverend Arthur Cayley Headlam
- 1923–1931: The Reverend Walter Robert Matthews
- 1923–1932: The Reverend Bertram Fitzgerald Simpson
- 1925–1936: The Reverend Alfred Charles Eustace Jarvis
- 1926–1936: The Reverend Clarence Haselwood Hamilton
- 1926–1936: The Reverend Canon Arthur Rowland Harry Grant
- 1926–1936: The Reverend Wallace Harold Elliott
- 1926–1933: The Reverend Richard Henry Malden
- 1926–1935: The Reverend Joseph Wellington Hunkin
- 1927–1936: The Reverend Frederic Athelwold Iremonger
- 1928–1936: The Reverend William Patrick Glyn McCormick
- 1929–1936: The Reverend Canon Frederick Homes Dudden
- 1929–1931: The Reverend Mervyn George Haigh
- 1929–1930: The Reverend Canon Robert Andrew Mitchell
- 1929–1935: The Reverend Canon Spencer Cecil Carpenter
- 1930–1936: The Reverend Frank Russell Barry
- 1930–1936: The Venerable Alfred Edward John Rawlinson
- 1931–1936: The Venerable Frederick Brodie Macnutt
- 1931–1934: The Reverend Canon Alwyn Terrell Petre Williams
- 1932–1936: The Reverend Harold Costley-White
- 1933–1936: The Reverend Canon William John Telia Phythian-Adams
- 1933–1936: The Reverend Canon John Charles Halland How
- 1933–1936: The Reverend Canon Oliver Chase Quick
- 1933–1935: The Reverend Canon Alfred Carey Wollaston Rose
- 1934–1936: The Reverend Canon Frank Partridge
- 1934–1936: The Reverend Canon Anthony Charles Deane
- 1934–1936: The Reverend Alan Campbell Don
- 1935–1936: The Reverend Canon Richard Brook
- 1935–1936: The Reverend Canon Cuthbert Carroll Thicknesse
- 1935–1936: The Reverend Canon Hugh Richard Lawrie Sheppard
- 1935–1936: The Reverend Ernest Hayford Thorold

===== Honorary Chaplains =====
- 1910–1920: The Reverend and Hon. J. S. Northcote
- 1910–1911: The Reverend Canon Edward Russell Bernard
- 1910–1914: The Venerable Archdeacon Owen Evans
- 1910–1926: The Reverend J. C. Cox-Edwards
- 1910–1923: The Reverend J. H. Berry
- 1910–: The Reverend E. H. Goodwin
- 1910–1919: The Reverend William Henry Bliss
- 1910–1912: The Reverend A. B. Boyd-Carpenter
- 1910–1920: The Reverend Canon John Erskine Clarke
- 1910–1916: The Reverend J. L. Davies
- 1910–1914: The Venerable Archdeacon W. Donne
- 1910–1911: The Reverend Lord Charles FitzRoy
- 1910–1914: The Reverend Prebendary McCormick
- 1910–1912: The Reverend A. L. B. Peile
- 1910–1916: The Reverend David Robertson
- 1910–1917: The Venerable Archdeacon Sinclair
- 1910–1912: The Reverend F. M. Stopford
- 1910–1920: The Reverend Edmond Warre
- 1910: The Venerable Archdeacon C. T. Wilkinson
- 1910–1926: The Reverend W. S. Harris
- 1910–1915: The Reverend R. Tahourdin
- 1910–1917: The Reverend Lord William Gascoyne-Cecil
- 1911–1917: The Reverend Henry Barclay Swete
- 1911–1928: The Reverend Canon Arthur Mason
- 1911–1918: The Reverend Henry Gamble
- 1912–1920: The Reverend Canon Hardwicke Drummond Rawnsley
- 1912–1913: The Reverend Prebendary John Storrs
- 1912–1922: The Reverend George Fossick Wilson
- 1912–1921: The Venerable Henry Armstrong Hall
- 1912–1933: The Venerable William John Wickins
- 1914–1929: The Reverend Ernest Morell Blackie
- 1914–1936: The Reverend Canon Peter Green
- 1915–1920: The Reverend Joseph Gough McCormick
- 1915–1921: The Reverend William Temple
- 1916–1929: The Reverend Hugh Richard Lawrie Sheppard
- 1916–1936: The Reverend Samuel Bickersteth
- 1917–1927: The Reverend Ernest Neville Lovett
- 1917–1921: The Reverend Edward Arthur Burroughs

==== Chaplains in Ordinary in Scotland ====
- 1910–1916: The Very Reverend Donald Macleod
- 1910–1913: The Very Reverend J. Cameron Lees
- 1910: The Very Reverend James MacGregor
- 1910–1914: The Reverend J. R. Mitford Mitchell
- 1910–1926: The Reverend A. Wallace Williamson
- 1910–1936: The Reverend S. J. Ramsay Sibbald
- 1910–1924: The Right Reverend Pearson M'Adam Muir
- 1913–1934: The Reverend Robert H. Fisher
- 1914–1925: The Reverend Alexander Miller Maclean
- 1916–1936: The Reverend Professor William Paterson Paterson
- 1924–1936: The Reverend John White
- 1925–1936: The Reverend Archibald Main
- 1926–1936: The Reverend Norman MacLean
- 1929–1936: The Reverend Alexander Martin
- 1929–1936: The Reverend Robert J. Drummond
- 1929–1933: The Reverend Donald Fraser
- 1933–1936: The Very Reverend Sir George Adam Smith
- 1934–1936: The Very Reverend Charles Laing Warr

===== Extra Chaplains in Ordinary in Scotland =====
- 1910–1922: The Reverend Professor Malcolm C. Taylor
- 1926–1934: The Reverend Charles Laing Warr

=== Chapels Royal ===
==== Dean of the Chapels Royal ====
- 1910–: The Bishop of London

===== Sub-Dean of the Chapels Royal =====
- 1910–1921: The Reverend Canon Edgar Sheppard

==== Priests in Ordinary ====
- 1910–: The Reverend H. D. Macnamara
- 1910–: The Reverend L. J. Percival
- 1910–: The Reverend T. R. Hine-Haycock
- 1910–1915: The Reverend George Grey Wilkinson
- 1915–1916: The Reverend Hugh Richard Lawrie Sheppard

===== Deputy Priests =====
- 1910–: The Reverend D. Aiken Sneath
- 1910–1915: The Reverend Hugh Richard Lawrie Sheppard

===== Honorary Priests =====
- 1910–: The Reverend H. Aldrich Cotton
- 1910–: The Reverend E. W. Kempe
- 1910–: The Venerable Archdeacon Edwin Price
- 1910–: The Reverend H. G. Daniell-Bainbridge

==== Domestic Chaplains ====
- 1910–1936: The Dean of Windsor
- 1910: The Reverend Canon Frederick Alfred John Hervey
- 1910–1921: The Reverend Canon Edgar Sheppard
- 1910–1931: The Reverend Canon John Neale Dalton
- 1911: The Reverend Frederic Percival Farrar
- 1912–1926: The Reverend Arthur Rowland Harry Grant
- 1923–1936: The Reverend Prebendary Launcelot Jefferson Percival
- 1926–1936: The Reverend Arthur Rose Fuller

===== Chaplain at Hampton Court Palace =====
- 1910–1926: The Reverend A. G. Ingram
- 1926–1936: The Reverend Walter Kelly Firminger

==== Domestic Chaplain to His Majesty in Scotland ====
- 1920–1936: The Reverend John Stirton

== Household of Queen Mary 1910–1953 ==
=== Mistress of the Robes ===
- 1910–1953: The Duchess of Devonshire
- 1916–1921: The Duchess of Sutherland (during the absence of the Duchess of Devonshire in Canada)

=== Ladies of the Bedchamber ===
- 1910–1913: The Countess of Shaftesbury
- 1911–1936: The Countess of Minto
- 1911–1953: The Lady Ampthill
- 1911–1916, 1924–1936: The Lady Desborough
- 1913–1924: The Countess Fortescue
- 1916–1953: The Countess of Airlie

==== Extra Ladies of the Bedchamber ====
- 1910–1916: The Countess of Airlie
- 1910–1936: The Countess of Bradford
- 1910–1944: The Lady Lamington
- 1913–1953: The Countess of Shaftesbury
- 1916–1924, 1936–1952: The Lady Desborough
- 1924–1929: The Countess Fortescue
- 1936–1940: The Dowager Countess of Minto

=== Women of the Bedchamber ===
- 1910–1936: The Lady Eva Dugdale
- 1910–1927: The Lady Mary Trefusis
- 1910–1920: The Lady Katherine Coke
- 1910–1935: The Lady Bertha Dawkins
- 1914–1920: The Lady Isobel Gathorne-Hardy
- 1920–1936: The Lady Joan Verney
- 1920–1924: Lady Elizabeth Dawson
- 1923–1953: Lady Cynthia Colville
- 1924–1936: The Lady Elizabeth Hesketh-Prichard
- 1927–1930: The Lady Katharine Hamilton
- 1930–1937: Lady Victoria Alexandrina Weld-Forester
- 1935–1938: the Hon. Jean Hamilton Bruce
- 1937–1953: Lady Constance Milnes-Gaskell
- 1938–1951: The Hon. Margaret Blanche Wyndham
- 1951–1953: Lady Cecily Kathleen Vesey

==== Extra Women of the Bedchamber ====
- 1930–1953: The Lady Katharine Seymour (née Hamilton)
- 1935–1943: The Lady Bertha Dawkins
- 1936–1940: The Lady Eva Dugdale
- 1936–1951: The Lady Joan Verney
- 1936–1953: The Lady Elizabeth Motion (formerly Hesketh-Prichard)
- 1937–1953: Lady Victoria Forester
- 1938–1939: the Hon. Jean Hamilton Bruce
- 1951–1953: The Hon. Margaret Blanche Wyndham

=== Maids of Honour ===
- 1911–1912: the Hon. Sybil Brodrick
- 1911–: the Hon. Venetia Baring
- 1911–: Miss Katherine Villiers
- 1911–1920: Miss Mabel Gye
- 1912–1927: Miss Ursula Lawley
- 1914–1917: the Hon. Sibyl Cadogan (Extra)
- 1927–1935: the Hon. Jean Hamilton Bruce

=== Lord Chamberlain to the Queen ===
- 1910–1922: The Earl of Shaftesbury
- 1922–1947: Charles Paget, 6th Marquess of Anglesey
- 1947–1953: vacant

==== Vice- Chamberlain ====
- 1910–1912: The Lord Wenlock

=== Treasurer to the Queen ===
- 1910–19: the Hon. (later Sir) Alexander Hood
- 1919–: Sir Edward William Wallington
- 1932–35: Sir Harry Lloyd Verney (Treasurer and Private Secretary)
- 1936–1953: Capt. the Lord Claud N. Hamilton (Comptroller, Treasurer and Extra Equerry)

=== Private Secretary to the Queen ===
- 1910–1919: Edward William Wallington, Esq.
- 1919–35: Harry Lloyd Verney, Esq.
- 1935–39: the Hon. (later Sir) Gerald Chichester

=== Equerries to the Queen ===
- 1910–1925: Lt-Col. Frank Dugdale
- 1936–1938: Lt-Col. Sir Reginald Seymour
- 1936–1940: Capt. Arthur Paget
- 1938–1953: Maj. the Hon. John Spencer Coke

==== Extra Equerries ====
- 1936–1953: Capt. the Lord Claud Hamilton
- 1936–1953: Maj. the Hon. Sir Richard Molyneux
- 1940–1953: Capt. Arthur Paget

== See also ==
- Royal Households of the United Kingdom
- Household of Edward VII and Alexandra
- Household of George VI and Elizabeth
