= List of knights commander of the Royal Victorian Order appointed by George V =

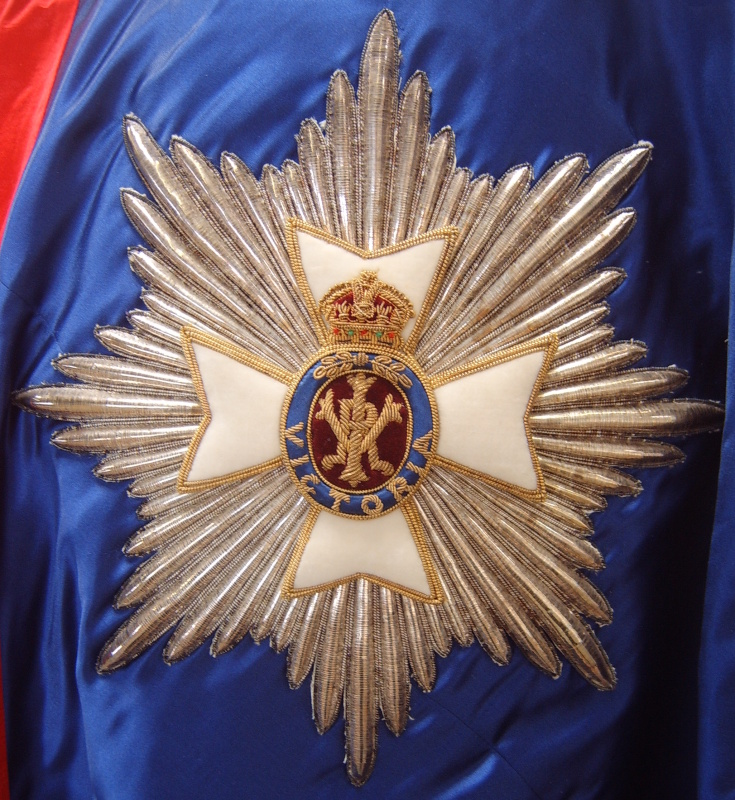
The star of a Knight or Dame Grand Cross of the Royal Victorian Order

The Royal Victorian Order is an order of knighthood awarded by the sovereign of the United Kingdom and several Commonwealth realms. It is granted personally by the monarch and recognises personal service to the monarchy, the Royal Household, royal family members, and the organisation of important royal events. The order was officially created and instituted on 23 April 1896 by letters patent under the Great Seal of the Realm by Queen Victoria. It was instituted with five grades, the two highest of which were Knight Grand Cross (GCVO) and Knight Commander (KCVO), which conferred the status of knighthood on holders (apart from foreigners, who typically received honorary awards not entitling them to the style of a knight). Women were not admitted until Edward VIII altered the statutes of the order in 1936; those receiving the highest two awards were styled dames and those grades, when conferred on women, are Dame Grand Cross and Dame Commander (DCVO).

No limit was placed on the number of appointments which could be made. King George V appointed 289 Knights Commander between his accession to the throne on 6 May 1910 and his death on 20 January 1936.

== Knights commander appointed by George V ==
The list below is ordered by date of appointment. Full names, ranks and titles are given where applicable, as correct at the time of appointment to the order. Branch of service or regiment details are given in parentheses to distinguish them from offices. Where applicable, the occasion is given that was listed either with the notices or in published material elsewhere, in which case that material is cited.

Name	Date	Notes
Prince Alexander of Battenberg	3 June 1910	
Hon. Henry Charles Legge, CVO	3 June 1910	Equerry to the King and Registrar and Secretary of the Order of Merit
Frederick Edward Grey Ponsonby, CVO, CB	3 June 1910	Assistant Private Secretary and Equerry to the Queen
George Lindsay Holford, CVO, CIE	3 June 1910	Extra Equerry to the King and Equerry to the Queen
Walter Douglas Somerset Campbell, CVO	3 June 1910	Groom in Waiting and Deputy Ranger, Windsor Great Park
Hon. Seymour John Fortescue, CVO, CMG	14 June 1910	Equerry to the King
James Kingston Fowler	26 October 1910	For medical services to Prince Francis of Teck
Alfred Pearce Gould	26 October 1910	For medical services to Prince Francis of Teck
Henry Jenner Scobell, CVO, CB	7 November 1910	General Officer Commanding Cape of Good Hope District. Appointed on the occasion of the visit of the Duke of Connaught to South Africa for the opening of the first Parliament of the Union
Sir William Henry Milton, KCMG	21 November 1910	Administrator of South Rhodesia. Appointed on the occasion of the visit of the Duke of Connaught.
Prince Leopold of Battenberg	19 June 1911	Appointed on the occasion of the Coronation of George V and Queen Mary
Prince Maurice of Battenberg	19 June 1911	Appointed on the occasion of the Coronation of George V and Queen Mary
Hon. William Charles Wentworth Fitzwilliam	19 June 1911	Crown Equerry to the King. Appointed on the occasion of the Coronation of George V and Queen Mary
Sir Charles Leopold Cust, Bt, CB, CMG, CIE, MVO	19 June 1911	Equerry to the King. Appointed on the occasion of the Coronation of George V and Queen Mary
Sir Alfred Scott Scott-Gatty, CVO	19 June 1911	Garter Principal King of Arms. Appointed on the occasion of the Coronation of George V and Queen Mary
Sir Rufus Daniel Isaacs, KC, MP	19 June 1911	Attorney-General. Appointed on the occasion of the Coronation of George V and Queen Mary
Sir John Allsebrook Simon, KC, MP	19 June 1911	Solicitor-General. Appointed on the occasion of the Coronation of George V and Queen Mary
Rev. Canon John Neale Dalton, CVO, CMG	19 June 1911	Domestic Chaplain and Deputy Clerk of the Closet. Appointed on the occasion of the Coronation of George V and Queen Mary
Henry David Erskine, CVO	19 June 1911	Gentleman Usher to the King and to the Robes. Appointed on the occasion of the Coronation of George V and Queen Mary
Alfred Edward Codrington, CVO, CB	19 June 1911	General Officer Commanding London District. Appointed on the occasion of the Coronation of George V and Queen Mary
William Patrick Byrne, CB	19 June 1911	Assistant Under Secretary of State, Home Office. Appointed on the occasion of the Coronation of George V and Queen Mary
Edwin Frederick Wodehouse, CB	19 June 1911	Assistant Commissioner, Metropolitan Police. Appointed on the occasion of the Coronation of George V and Queen Mary
Bertrand Edward Dawson	19 June 1911	Physician Extraordinary to the King. Appointed on the occasion of the Coronation of George V and Queen Mary
Ailwyn Edward Fellowes	29 June 1911	Appointed on the occasion of the King's visit to the Royal Agricultural Society Show in Norwich.
Sir James Brown Dougherty, KCB, CVO	12 July 1911	Under Secretary to the Lord Lieutenant of Ireland. Appointed on the occasion of the King's visit to Ireland.
Sir George John Scott Warrender, Bt, CVO, CB	12 July 1911	Commanding Second Cruiser Squadron. Appointed on the occasion of the King's visit to Ireland
Sir Neville Francis Fitzgerald Chamberlain, KCB	12 July 1911	Inspector General, Royal Irish Constabulary. Appointed on the occasion of the King's visit to Ireland.
Sir John Foster George Ross of Bladensburg, KCB	12 July 1911	Chief Commissioner, Dublin Metropolitan Police. Appointed on the occasion of the King's visit to Ireland.
Charles Henry Coke	12 July 1911	Senior Naval Officer on the Coast of Ireland. Appointed on the occasion of the King's visit to Ireland.
Lord Herbert Lionel Henry Vane-Tempest	15 July 1911	Appointed on the occasion of the King's visit to Wales.
Sir William Henry Mackinnon, KCB, CVO	15 July 1911	General Officer Commanding, Western Command.
Sir Bruce Meade Hamilton, KCB	20 July 1911	General Officer Commanding, Scottish Command. Appointed on the occasion of the King's visit to Edinburgh.
Hon. Derek William George Keppel, CVO, CMG, CIE	24 July 1911	Master of the Household. Appointed on the occasion of the Coronation of King George V and Queen Mary
Sir Thomas Vezey Strong	8 November 1911	Lord Mayor of London
James Alexander Bell	27 November 1911	Political Resident of Aden and General Officer Commanding, Aden Brigade. Appointed on the occasion of the King and Queen's visit to Aden.
Edward Lee French	12 December 1911	Inspector General of Police, Punjab. Appointed on the occasion of the King and Queen's visit to India.
Rollo Estouteville Grimston, CIE	12 December 1911	Military Secretary to the King. Appointed on the occasion of the King and Queen's visit to India.
Nawab Sir Muhammad Aslam Khan, KCIE, ADC	12 December 1911	Honorary Aide-de-Camp attached to the King's suite. Appointed on the occasion of the King and Queen's visit to India.
Sir Edmond John Warre Slade, KCIE, MVO	12 December 1911	Commander-in-Chief, East Indies Station. Appointed on the occasion of the King and Queen's visit to India.
The Nawab of Pahasu, KCIE, CSI	12 December 1911	Chief Member of Council, Jaipur State. Appointed on the occasion of the King and Queen's visit to India.
Bhim Shamsher Jang (Rana Bahadur of Nepal)	24 December 1911	Commander-in-Chief. Appointed on the occasion of the King and Queen's visit to Nepal.
Hon. Sidney Robert Greville, CVO, CB	1 January 1912	Paymaster of the Household
Hon. Arthur Henry John Walsh, CVO	1 January 1912	Master of the Ceremonies to the King
The Nawab of Murshidabad, KCSI	4 January 1912	Chairman, Pageant Committee, Calcutta. Appointed on the occasion of the King and Queen's visit to India.
Sir Arthur Arnold Barrett, KCB	4 January 1912	Adjutant-General, India. Appointed on the occasion of the King and Queen's visit to India.
Bryan Thomas Mahon, CB, DSO	4 January 1912	Commanded Proclamation Parade, Calcutta. Appointed on the occasion of the King and Queen's visit to India.
Gerald Charles Kitson, CVO, CB, CMG	4 January 1912	Quartermaster-General, India. Appointed on the occasion of the King and Queen's visit to India.
Sir Frederick Evans, KCMG, CVO	31 January 1912	Colonial Secretary, Gibraltar. Appointed on the occasion of the King and Queen's visit.
The Lord Annaly, CVO	4 February 1912	Lord of the Bedchamber. Appointed on the occasion of the King and Queen's visit to India.
Sir Stuart Brownlow Beatson, KCB, KCSI	4 February 1912	Acting Private Secretary to the Queen. Appointed on the occasion of the King and Queen's visit to India.
Christopher George Francis Maurice Cradock, CB, MVO	28 February 1912	Commanding, Fourth Cruiser Squadron. For services to the Princess Royal on the occasion of the wreck of the SS Delhi in December 1911.
The Lord Michelham	2 April 1912	
William Boyd Carpenter	18 April 1912	Clerk of the Closet to the King. Appointed on the confirmation of Prince Albert.
Professor Alexander Ogston	14 June 1912	Honorary Surgeon to the King in Scotland
The Earl Fitzwilliam, DSO	12 July 1912	Appointed on the occasion of the King and Queen's visit to the West Riding of Yorkshire.
Charles Crutchley, MVO	1 January 1913	Lieutenant-Governor, Royal Hospital, Chelsea.
Hon. Richard Charles Moreton, CVO	3 June 1913	Marshal of the Ceremonies of the King, 1887–1912.
Sir Edward John Poynter, Bt	3 June 1913	President of the Royal Academy of Arts
George Edwin Patey, MVO	30 June 1913	In command of the King's Fleet. On the King's visit to Portsmouth to inspect HMS Australia.
William Robert Robertson, CVO, CB, DSO	26 September 1913	In attendance on the King during his visit to Althorp for a British Army Exercise.
Sir Rickman John Godlee, Bt	1 January 1914	Honorary Surgeon in Ordinary to the King
Sir Henry Hugh Oldham, CVO	1 January 1914	Lieutenant, Honourable Corps of Gentlemen-at-Arms
Sir William Job Collins	1 January 1914	Honorary Secretary to the League of Mercy
Sir Aston Webb, CVO, CB	1 January 1914	President of the Royal Academy.
Herbert Acton Blake	25 May 1914	Deputy Master, Trinity House. Appointed on the occasion of the 400th anniversary of its foundation.
Rev. Canon Edgar Sheppard, CVO	22 June 1914	Domestic Chaplain to the King, Canon of St George's, Deputy Clerk of the Closet and Sub-Dean of the Chapels Royal
Frederick Spencer Robb, CB, MVO	22 June 1914	In charge of Administration at the Aldershot Command
Thomas Herbert Warren	13 November 1914	President of Magdalen College, Oxford, where the Prince of Wales was in residence.
Arthur Foley Winnington Ingram	17 April 1915	Lord Bishop of London and Dean of the King's Chapels Royal
The Lord Acton, MVO	1 January 1916	Lord in Waiting to the King
Sir James Robert Dunlop Smith, KCSI, CIE	1 January 1916	Political Aide-de-Camp to the Secretary of State for India
Sir Anthony Alfred Bowlby, KCMG	1 January 1916	Honorary Surgeon in Ordinary to the King
Sir Thomas Little Heath, KCB	3 June 1916	Joint Permanent Secretary to the Treasury and Auditor of the Civil List
Malcolm Donald Murray, CVO, CB	3 June 1916	Comptroller to the Duke of Connaught
Edward William Wallington, CVO, CMG	3 June 1916	Groom in Waiting to the King and Private Secretary to the Queen
Henry Streatfeild, CVO, CB	3 June 1916	Private Secretary to Queen Alexandra and Extra Equerry to the King
Sir David Beatty, KCB, MVO, DSO	17 June 1916	Commander-in-Chief, Battle Cruiser Squadron. Appointed on the occasion of the King's visit to the Grand Fleet.
Sir Henry Seymour Rawlinson, Bt, KCB, CVO	15 August 1916	Appointed on the occasion of the King's visit to his army in the field.
Sir Reginald Hugh Spencer Bacon, KCB, CVO, DSO	15 August 1916	Commanding, Dover Patrol. Appointed on the occasion of the King's visit to his army in the Field.
Prince George of Battenberg	15 November 1916	Appointed on the occasion of his marriage.
The Lord Herschell, CVO	1 January 1917	Lord in Waiting to the King
Hon. John Hubert Ward, CVO	1 January 1917	Extra Equerry to the King and Equerry to Queen Alexandra
Hon. Alexander Nelson Hood, CVO	1 January 1917	Treasurer to the Queen
Sir Robert William Burnet	1 January 1917	Physician to the Royal Household
Sir Maurice Bonham-Carter, KCB	4 June 1917	Formerly Private Secretary to the Earl of Oxford and Asquith
Sir William Christopher Pakenham, KCB, MVO	25 June 1917	Commanding Battle Cruiser Force. Appointed on the occasion of the King's visit to the Grand Fleet.
Osmond de Beauvoir Brock, CB, CMG	25 June 1917	Chief of Staff. Appointed on the occasion of the King's visit to the Grand Fleet.
General Sir Hubert de la Poer Gough, KCB	14 July 1917	Commander, 5th Army. Appointed on the King's visit to his army in the field.
Sir Arthur Thomas Sloggett, KCB, KCMG	14 July 1917	Director-General, Army Medical Services. Appointed on the King's visit to his army in the field.
Joseph John Asser, CB	14 July 1917	General Officer Commanding, Lines of Communications Area, British Expeditionary Force. Appointed on the King's visit to his army in the field.
Sir William Eliot Peyton, KCB, CVO, DSO	14 July 1917	Military Secretary and General Headquarters. Appointed on the King's visit to his army in the field.
Hugh Mallinson Rigby	22 December 1917	Surgeon to the King.
Sir Charles Edward Troup, KCB	1 January 1918	Permanent Under Secretary, Home Office.
Lord Marcus de la Poer Beresford, CVO	3 June 1918	Manager of the King's Racing and Breeding Stud.
Sir Alan Reeve Manby, MVO	3 June 1918	Physician Extraordinary to the King and Surgeon Apothecary at Sandringham
Sir Luke Fildes	3 June 1918	Painter of the Coronation Portrait of the King
Sir Edward Scott Worthington, CMG, MVO	3 June 1918	For services to the Duke of Connaught as Governor-General of Canada
Thomas Dacres Butler, CVO	3 June 1918	Yeoman Usher of the Black Rod and Secretary to the Lord Great Chamberlain
William Llewellyn	3 June 1918	Painter of the Queen's coronation portrait
Sir John William Nott-Bower, CVO	6 July 1918	Commissioner, City of London Police. Appointed on the King and Queen's visit to Guildhall to mark their silver wedding anniversary
Sir William Pulteney Pulteney, KCB, KCMG, DSO	10 September 1918	Appointed on the occasion of Prince Arthur of Connaught's mission to Japan
Sir David Henderson, KCB, DSO	10 December 1918	Military Counsellor, British Embassy in Paris. Appointed on the occasion of the King's visit.
Sir Roger John Brownlow Keyes, KCB, CMG, CVO, DSO	10 December 1918	Vice-Admiral, Dover Patrol. Appointed on the King's visit to the army in the field.
George Dixon Grahame, MVO	10 December 1918	Minister at Parish. Appointed on the King's visit to his army in the field.
Lionel Arthur Montagu Stopford, CB	1 January 1919	Commandant, Royal Military College, while Prince Henry was a cadet there.
Sir George Anderson Critchett, Bt, CVO	1 January 1919	Surgeon-Oculist in Ordinary to the King
Henry Farnham Burke, CB, CVO	22 February 1919	Garter King of Arms
Sir Douglas Romilly Lothian Nicholson, KCMG	24 April 1919	For services in command of the Royal Yachts.
Sir Francis John Davies, KCB, KCMG	3 June 1919	Military Secretary of State for War
Sir William Henry Weldon	3 June 1919	Clerenceux King of Arms
Bryan Godfrey Godfrey-Faussett, CMG, CVO	3 June 1919	Equerry to the King
Frederick Morris Fry, CVO	3 June 1919	Honorary Secretary, King Edward's Hospital Fund for London
George John Marjoribanks	3 June 1919	Partner in Messrs Coutts and Company
Joseph Oliver Skevington	3 June 1919	Senior Surgeon, King Edward VII Hospital, Windsor
Sir William George Tyrrell, KCMG, CB	1 December 1919	Minister at Washington. Appointed on the Prince of Wales' visit to Canada and the United States
Morgan Singer, CB	1 December 1919	Commander-in-Chief, North America and West Indies Station. Appointed on the occasion of the Prince of Wales' visit to Canada and the United States.
Sir Lionel Halsey, KCMG, CB	1 December 1919	Chief of the Prince of Wales' Staff. Appointed on his visit to Canada and the United States.
Sir Horace Brookes Marshall	1 January 1920	Lord Mayor of London
Sir Geoffrey Percy Thynne Feilding, KCB, CMG, DSO	21 February 1920	General Officer Commanding, London District
Sir Edward Walter Clervaux Chaytor, KCMG, CB	21 May 1920	Commandant, New Zealand Defence Force. Appointed on the occasion of the Prince of Wales' visit to Australia and New Zealand.
Sir William Fraser	21 May 1920	Minister of Mines. Appointed on the occasion of the Prince of Wales' visit to Australia and New Zealand.
William Fry, CB, CVO	23 July 1920	Lieutenant-Governor, Isle of Man. Appointed on the King's visit.
Sir Cyril Brudenell Bingham White, KCMG, CB, DSO	18 August 1920	Chief of the General Staff, Australian Forces. Appointed on the Prince of Wales' visit to Australia and New Zealand.
Edmund Percy Fenwick George Grant, CB	18 August 1920	First Naval Member, Royal Australian Naval Board. Appointed on the Prince of Wales' visit to Australia and New Zealand.
Sir Allan Frederic Everett, KCMG, CB	2 October 1920	Commanding Cruiser Squadron, North America and West Indies Station
Edward William Macleay Grigg, CMG, CVO, DSO, MC	11 October 1920	Private Secretary to the Prince of Wales. Appointed on the Prince of Wales' visit to Australia and New Zealand.
Bertram Pollock, CVO	1 January 1921	Lord Bishop of Norwich
Herbert Edward Ryle, CVO	1 January 1921	Dean of Westminster. For services in connection with the King's visit to the Abbey.
Hon. Sir Charles Russell, Bt	1 January 1921	For professional services to the King.
Sir Lionel Earle, KCB, CMG	1 January 1921	Permanent Secretary, Office of Works
Frederick Stanley Hewett, MVO	1 January 1921	Surgeon Apothecary to the King and Apothecary to the Royal Household
Sir Walter Parratt, CVO	10 February 1921	Master of the Music
John Loader Maffey, CSI, CIE	27 February 1921	Attached to the Duke of Connaught during his visit to India
Ernest de la Rue	7 May 1921	Honorary Treasurer, Royal Albert Hall. Appointed on the King's visit to mark the hall's jubilee.
Robert Alfred McCall, KC	4 June 1921	Attorney General of the Duchy of Lancaster
Sir Nevile Rodwell Wilkinson, CVO	22 June 1921	Ulster King of Arms. Appointed on the occasion of the King's visit to Belfast to open Parliament
Sir John Edward Capper, KCB	11 July 1921	Lieutenant-Governor of Guernsey. Appointed on the occasion of the King's visit to the Channel Islands
Sir William Douglas Smith, KCB	12 July 1921	Lieutenant-Governor of Jersey. Appointed on the occasion of the King's visit to the Channel Islands
Edgar Bertram Mackennal, MVO	20 July 1921	Sculptor of the statue for the King Edward VII Memorial, London
Sir Hugh Henry Darby Tothill, KCMG, CB	23 November 1921	Commander-in-Chief, East Indies Station. Appointed on the occasion of the Prince of Wales' visit to India.
The Lord Colebrooke, CVO	2 January 1922	Captain of the Honourable Corpos of Gentlemen at Arms and Lord in Waiting
Hon. Sir Hubert George Brand, KCMG, CB, CVO	2 January 1922	Commanding, Royal Yachts
Hon. Henry Julian Stonor, CVO	2 January 1922	Groom in Waiting and Gentleman Usher to the King
William Rose Smith, CB, CSO	2 January 1922	Clerk of the Council, Duchy of Lancaster
Percy Coleman Simmons	2 January 1922	Chairman of the London County Council
Sir John Barry Wood, KCIE, CSI	21 February 1922	Political Secretary to the Government of India. Appointed on the occasion of the Prince of Wales' visit to India.
Geoffrey Fitzhervey de Montmorency, CIE, CBE	16 March 1922	Chief Secretary to the Punjab Government. Appointed on the occasion of the Prince of Wales' visit to India.
Nawab of Bahawalpur	17 March 1921	Appointed on the occasion of the Prince of Wales' visit to India.
Maharaja of Jodhpur	17 March 1921	Appointed on the occasion of the Prince of Wales' visit to India.
Maharaja of Dholpur, KCSI	17 March 1921	Appointed on the occasion of the Prince of Wales' visit to India.
Maharaja of Dhar, KCSI, KBE	17 March 1921	Appointed on the occasion of the Prince of Wales' visit to India.
Maharaja of Ratlam, KCSI	17 March 1921	Appointed on the occasion of the Prince of Wales' visit to India.
Nawab of Palanpur, KCIE	17 March 1921	Appointed on the occasion of the Prince of Wales' visit to India.
Sir Hari Singh Raja of Kashmir, KCIE	17 March 1921	Appointed on the occasion of the Prince of Wales' visit to India.
Lewis Clinton-Baker, CB, CBE	21 March 1922	Commander-in-Chief, East Indies Station. Appointed on the occasion of the Prince of Wales' visit to India.
Sir Alexander Ludovic Dugg, KCB	8 April 1922	Commander-in-Chief, China Station. Appointed on the occasion of the Prince of Wales' visit to India.
Sir Fabian Arthur Goulstone Ware, KCB, CB, CMG	13 May 1922	Vice-Chairman, Imperial War Graves Commission.
Sir Rajeendra Nath Mukharji, KCIE	3 June 1922	Head of Martin and Co., Contractors of All-India Victoria Memorial Hall in Calcutta
Sir Alexander Campbell Mackenzie	3 June 1922	Principal, Royal Academy of Music
Richard Robert Cruise, CVO	3 June 1922	Surgeon-Oculist to the King
Lord Louis Francis Albert Victor Nicholas Mountbatten, MVO	18 July 1922	On the occasion of his marriage
Gerald Francis Talbot, CMG, OBE	14 December 1922	For services rendered to Prince Andrew of Greece
Sir Herbert James Creedy, KCB, CVO	1 January 1923	Permanent Under Secretary of State for War
Sir William Jameson Soulsby, CB, CIE, CVO	1 January 1923	For servinces in connection with the King Edward Memorial
Sir John Milsom Rees	1 January 1923	Laryngologist to the King and Queen
Henry Bertram Pelly, CB, MVO	1 January 1923	Senior Naval Officer, Gibraltar. Appointed on the occasion of the Prince of Wales' visit to India and the East
Hon. Odo William Theophilus Villiers Russell, CB, CVO	14 May 1923	Minister on special mission to the Vatican. Appointed on the occasion of the King's visit to Rome
The Viscount Valentia, CB, MVO	2 June 1923	Lord in Waiting to the King
Arthur Reginald Bankart, CVO	13 August 1923	Honorary Physician to the King
The Lord Blythewood, MVO	1 January 1924	Honorary Colonel, 81st Welsh Brigade, Royal Field Artillery of the Territorial Army
Sir James Humphreys Harrison, CVO	1 January 1924	Honorary Secretary, League of Mercy
Sir Warren Roland Crook-Lawless, CB, CIE, OBE	1 January 1924	House Governor of Osborne
George Darell Jeffreys, CB, CMG	1 January 1924	General Office Commanding, London District
Hon. George Arthur Charles Crichton, CVO	3 June 1924	Comptroller, Lord Chamberlain's Office
Sir Arthur Leetham, CMG	3 June 1924	Secretary, Royal United Service Institution
Walter Peacock, CVO	3 June 1924	Resident Councillor and Keeper of the Records, Duchy of Cornwall
William Fairbank, CVO, OBE	3 June 1924	Surgeon-Apothecary to the Royal Household at Windsor
Sir Frederick Morton Radcliffe	1 January 1925	For services in connection with the construction of Liverpool Cathedral
Henry John Forbes Simson	1 January 1925	For professional services to Princess Mary
Henry Tritton Buller, CB, CVO	22 April 1925	Commanding the Royal Yachts. Appointed during the King's cruise in the Mediterranean.
Hubert Murray Burge	3 June 1925	Lord Bishop of Oxford, Clerk of the Closet and Chancellor of the Order of the Garter
Bernard Edward Halsey Bircham	3 June 1925	Solicitor to the King
Joseph Henry Greer	3 June 1925	Director of the National Stud
John Francis Burn-Murdoch, CB, CMG, CBE	11 June 1925	Appointed to mark the presentation of a new guidon to the 1st Royal Dragoons
Sir Thomas Jeeves Horder, Bt	10 July 1925	For professional services to the Princess Royal
Maurice Swynfen FitzMaurice, CB, CMG	29 July 1925	Commander-in-Chief, Africa Stations. Appointed on the occasion of the Prince of Wales' visit to Africa
Sir Godfrey John Vignoles Thomas, Bt, CSI, CVO	16 October 1925	Private Secretary to the Prince of Wales. Appointed on the occasion of the Prince of Wales' visit to Africa
Lord Carnegie	1 January 1926	
Sir James Balfour Paul, CVO	1 January 1926	Lyon King of Arms
Andrew Wallace Williamson, CVO	18 February 1926	Dean of the Thistle and the Chapel Royal in Scotland
Hon. John William Fortescue, CVO	16 June 1926	Librarian, Windsor Castle
Victor George Seymour Corkran, CVO	3 July 1926	Comptroller to the Princess Beatrice
John Murray, CVO	3 July 1926	Publisher of Queen Victoria's letters
Herbert Edward Mitchell, CVO	3 July 1926	Clerk of the Council, Duchy of Lancaster
The Earl of Denbigh and Desmond, CVO	1 January 1927	Colonel Commandant, Honourable Artillery Company
Sir Arthur Stockdale Cope	1 January 1927	
Ernest Frederick Orby Gascoigne, CMG, DSO	1 January 1927	Comptroller of the Union Jack Club and Harbinger of the Honourable Corps of Gentlemen at Arms
Ernest Beachcroft Beckwith Towse, VC, CBE	1 January 1927	Chairman, National Institute for the Blind
Sir Robert Heaton Rhodes, KBE	18 March 1927	Vice-President, Executive Council of the Commonwealth of Australia
George Foster Pearce	9 May 1927	Minister of Defence, Australia
The Earl of Eltham	3 June 1927	
Sir Francis Bernard Dicksee	3 June 1927	President of the Royal Academy
Harry Lloyd Verney, CVO	3 June 1927	Groom in Waiting to the King and Private Secretary to the Queen
Edward Farquhar Buzzard	3 June 1927	Extra Physician to the King and Regius Professor of Medicine at the University of Oxford
Harry Fagg Buttersbee, CMG, CVO	27 June 1927	Political Secretary to the Duke of York
Lionel Henry Cust, CVO	17 December 1927	Surveyor of the King's Pictures and Extra Gentleman Usher to the King
Sir Edward Elgar, OM	2 January 1928	Master of the King's Music
Sir Frank Baines, CVO, CBE	2 January 1928	Director of Works, Office of Works
Clive Wigram, CB, CSI, CVO	2 January 1928	Assistant Private Secretary and Equerry to the King
Arthur D'Arcy Gordon Bannerman, CIE, CVO	2 January 1928	Political Aide-de-Camp at the India Office and Extra Gentleman Usher to the King
Sir Hugh Percy Allen, CVP	4 June 1928	Director, Royal College of Music
Sir Charles John Holmes	4 June 1928	Director, National Gallery
John Marnoch, CVO	4 June 1928	Honorary Surgeon to the King in Scotland
Philip Hunloke, CVO	4 June 1928	Groom in Waiting to the King
The Earl of Airlie, MC	10 May 1929	Attached to the Duke of Gloucester during his Garter mission to Japan
Hon. Herbert Meade, CB, CVO, DSO	10 May 1929	Attached to the Duke of Gloucester during his Garter mission to Japan
Sir Hugh Jamieson Elles, KCMG, CB, DSO	10 May 1929	Attached to the Duke of Gloucester during his Garter mission to Japan
Gordon Carter, CVO	3 June 1929	Secretary to the King's Comptroller at Ascot
Francis Edward Shipway	3 June 1929	For professional services during the Queen's illness
Henry Hervey Campbell, CB, CVO	1 January 1930	Groom in Waiting to the King
Colin John Davidson, CIE, CVO	1 January 1930	British Consul, Tokyo
Russell Facey Wilkinson, MVO	1 January 1930	For professional services to the Princess Royal
Leonard Lionel Cohen	1 January 1930	Joint Honorary Secretary, King Edward's Hospital Fund for London
The Lord Stanmore, CVO	3 June 1930	Treasurer, St Bartholomew's Hospital
Sir Charles Hubert Montgomery, KCMG, CB, CVO	3 June 1930	Vice-Marshal of the Diplomatic Corps
George Robert Mansell, CBE, MVO	3 June 1930	Honorary Treasurer, King George's Fund for Sailors
Harold Augustus Wernher	3 June 1930	Honorary Secretary, King Edward's Hospital Fund for London
William Ralph Inge, CVO	25 June 1930	Dean of St Paul's
Sir Sidney Barton, KBE, CMG	30 October 1930	Minister, Addis Ababa. Appointed on the occasion of the Duke of Gloucester's visit for the coronation of the Emperor of Ethiopia.
Sir Arthur Wellesley Clarke, KBE	1 January 1931	Deputy Chairman, King George's Fund for Sailors
Harold Brakspear	1 January 1931	Architect, restoration of St George's Chapel, Windsor
Ashley Watson Mackintosh	1 January 1931	Extra Physician to the King in Scotland
Henry Linnington Martyn, CVO	8 May 1931	Surgeon-Apothecary to the Royal Household at Windsor
Sir Samuel Guise Guise-Moores, KCB, CMG	3 June 1931	House Governor of Osnorne
Ralph Endersby Harwood, CB, CVO, CBE	3 June 1931	Deputy Treasurer and Financial Secretary to the King
Arthur Edward Erskine, CVO, DSO	3 June 1931	Crown Equerry to the King
Alexander Hendry, CVO	26 September 1931	Surgeon-Apothecary to the Royal Household at Balmoral
Albert Victor Baillie, CVO	1 January 1932	Dean of Windsor and Domestic Chaplain to the King
Hon. Hew Hamilton Dalrymple	1 January 1932	Chairman, Trustees of the National Galleries of Scotland
Sir Malcolm Delevingne, KCB	1 January 1932	Permanent Deputy Under Secretary, Home Office
Charles Edward Corkran, CB, CMG	1 January 1932	General Officer Commanding, London District
Sir Cecil Bingham Levita, CBE, MVO	1 January 1932	King George Hospital, East London
John Weir, CVO	1 January 1932	Physician to the King
Hon. Alexander Robert Maule Ramsay, DSO	3 June 1932	
Sir Charles Wallis King, CB, CMG, CVO	3 June 1932	Honorary Secretary and Manager, Royal Tournament
Francis Noel Curtis-Bennett, CVO	3 June 1932	Secretary, National Playing Fields Association
John Murray, DSO	3 June 1932	Publisher of Queen Victoria's letters
Joseph Armitage Robinson	3 June 1932	Lord High Almoner, Dean of Wells and Chaplain in Ordinary to the King
Edward Denny Bacon, CVO	21 December 1932	Curator, Philatelic Collection
Sir Philip Horace Freeman, KBE	2 January 1933	Solicitor to Queen Alexandra's Memorial Fund
Frederic Jeune Willans, CVO	2 January 1933	Surgeon-Apothecary to the Royal Household at Sandringham
Basil Vernon Brooke, CVO	3 June 1933	Treasurer to the Queen, Groom in Waiting and Extra Equerry to the King
Stewart Blakeley Agnew Patterson, CSI, CIE	3 June 1933	Political Aide-de-Camp to the Secretary of State for India
Thomas Peel Dunhill, CMG	3 June 1933	Surgeon in Ordinary to the King
Morton Smart, CVO, DSO, RD	3 June 1933	Manipulative Surgeon to the King
Sir Richard Tetley Glazebrook, KCB	1 January 1934	Member, Royal Commission for the Exhibition of 1851
Sir William Tindall Lister, KCMG	1 January 1934	Consulting Surgeon-Oculist to the King.
Sir Cecil Harcourt-Smith, CVO	1 January 1934	Surveyor of the King's Works of Art
Edward Seymour, CVO, DSO, OBE	1 January 1934	Comptroller to Princess Victoria and Extra Equerry to the King
Sir Reginald Ward Edward Lane Poole	4 June 1934	For services to the Grand Duchess Zenia of Russia
Hon. Montague Charles Eliot, CVO, OBE	4 June 1934	Groom in Waiting, Groom of the Robes and Gentleman Usher to the King
Maurice Alan Cassidy, CB	4 June 1934	Physician to the King
William Foxley Norris, CVO	29 November 1934	Dean of Westminster during the wedding of the Duke and Duchess of Kent
Hon. Charles William Clanan Marr, DSO, MC, VD	10 December 1934	Commonwealth Minister in Charge, Duke of Gloucester's tour of Australia
Charles John Cecil Grant, CB, DSO	12 December 1934	General Officer Commanding, London District
George Redston Warner, CMG	14 December 1934	For services at the Foreign Office
Sir Gerald Woods Wollaston, MVO	1 January 1935	Garter Principal King of Arms
Sir Robert Arthur Johnson, KBE, TD	1 January 1935	Deputy Master and Comptroller of the Royal Mint
Reginald Henry Seymour, CVO	1 January 1935	Equerry to the Queen
Percy Robert Laurie, CBE, DSO	1 January 1935	Appointed on the occasion of the wedding of the Duke and Duchess of Kent
William Reid Dick	1 January 1935	Sculptor of the bust of the King
Edmund Ivens Spriggs	1 January 1935	For professional services to Princess Victoria
Hon. James Alexander Young	21 January 1935	Appointed on the occasion of the Duke of Gloucester's visit to New Zealand
Arthur Randolph Wormeley Curtis, CMG, CVO, MC	28 March 1935	Private Secretary to the Duke of Gloucester
Sir Stephen Henry Molyneux Killik	3 June 1935	Lord Mayor of London
Sir Robert Vaughan Gower, OBE, MP	3 June 1935	Chairman, Royal Society for the Prevention of Cruelty to Animals
Francis James Grant, CVO	3 June 1935	Lord Lyon King of Arms
Walter Robert Matthew	3 June 1935	Dean of St Paul's
Thomas John Spence Lyne, CB, DSO	3 June 1935	Meritorious service in the Royal Navy
Hon. Richard Frederick Molyneux, CVO	3 June 1935	Goom in Waiting to the King and Extra Equerry to the Queen
Frederick Albert Minter, CVO	3 June 1935	For services to the restoration of St George's Chapel, Windsor
James Albert Walton	3 June 1935	Surgeon to the King
Lancelot Edward Barrington-Ward	3 June 1935	Surgeon to the King
Harry Robert Boyd, CVO, CBE	19 July 1935	Ceremonial and Reception Secretary to the Home Secretary
Walter John Tapper	23 July 1935	Surveyor of Westminster Abbey
Launcelot Jefferson Percival, CVO	1 January 1936	Precentor, Chapels Royal, and Deputy Clerk of the Closet
Sir James Milne, CSI	1 January 1936	General Manager, Great Western Railway
Louis Francis Roebuck Knuthsen, CVO, OBE	1 January 1936	Physician in Ordinary to the Princess Royal
Henry Lennox Hopkinson	1 January 1936	Vice-President of the Council of the Royal Albert Hall
