= Bryan Faussett (disambiguation) =

Bryan Faussett (1720–1776) was an English antiquary.

Bryan Faussett may also refer to:

- Bryan Godfrey-Faussett (1863–1945), British naval officer
- Brian Fawcett (1944–2022), Canadian writer
