= George Paynter (British Army officer) =

British Army general and courtier (1880–1950)

Brigadier-General Sir George Paynter KCVO CMG DSO*
- Born: 2 August 1880; London, England
- Died: 15 August 1950 (aged 70); Grantham, England
- Military career
- Allegiance: United Kingdom
- Branch: British Army
- Rank: Brigadier-General
- Units: Lincolnshire Regiment; Scots Guards
- Commands: 172nd (2/1st South Lancashire) Brigade
- Conflicts: First World War
- Awards: Knight Commander of the Royal Victorian Order, Companion of the Order of St Michael and St George, Distinguished Service Order and Bar, Mentioned in Dispatches

Brigadier-General Sir George Camborne Beauclerk Paynter KCVO, CMG, DSO* (2 August 1880 – 15 August 1950) was a British Army officer and courtier in the Household of King George V and Queen Mary.

== Early life ==
Paynter was born in London, the son of Major George Paynter (grandson of Samuel Paynter) and Frances Maria Janetta Beauclerk (granddaughter of William Beauclerk, 8th Duke of St Albans). He was educated at the Royal Military College, Sandhurst.

== Military career ==
He joined the British Army and was commissioned into the 4th (Militia) Battalion, Lincolnshire Regiment on 23 March 1898. He transferred to the Scots Guards, where he received a regular commission as a second lieutenant on 18 October 1899. Following the outbreak of the Second Boer War in late 1899, the 2nd battalion Scots Guards were posted to South Africa as reinforcements in April 1900. Paynter served there with the battalion until the end of the war, and took part in operations in the Orange River Colony from May to November 1900, including the actions at Biddulphsberg (May 1900) and in the Wittebergen (July 1900). He was promoted to lieutenant on 16 March 1901. The war ended with the Peace of Vereeniging in June 1902, and Paynter left Port Natal with other men of the 2nd Battalion Scots Guards on the SS Michigan in late September 1902, arriving at Southampton in late October, when the battalion was posted to Aldershot.

He served in the First World War. Paynter was awarded the Distinguished Service Order for his leadership of the 2nd Battalion, Scots Guards in fighting on 24 October 1914. On 25 August 1916 he became commanding officer of the 172nd (2/1st South Lancashire) Brigade and was promoted to temporary brigadier-general. He was awarded a bar to his DSO for gallant command of his brigade in October 1918. He was injured on 4 October 1918 and was sent to Highclere Castle in Berkshire to recover. While staying at the castle Paynter had a relationship with one of the nurses, who was subsequently fired by Almina Herbert, Countess of Carnarvon. He returned to his brigade on 25 October. On 2 June 1919 he was promoted to the substantive rank of lieutenant-colonel. He was promoted to full colonel in 1922 and invested as a Companion of the Order of St Michael and St George.

== Courtier ==
On 1 December 1927 Paynter was appointed as an equerry to George V. In 1930, by which time he was a brigadier-general, he resigned and became an extra equerry, a position he still held in July 1936. On 3 August 1937 he became Groom in Waiting. On 12 November 1943 he took retired pay and was granted the honorary rank of brigadier-general. He was appointed Lord Lieutenant of Sutherland on 6 March 1945. On 8 June 1950 he was invested as a Knight Commander of the Royal Victorian Order.

== Marriage ==
He married Alberta Diana Hunloke, daughter of Major Sir Philip Hunloke (a great-grandson of King William IV) and Sylvia Heseltine (daughter of John Postle Heseltine), on 5 February 1921 at St George's, Hanover Square.

He was the grandfather of Scottish socialite and heiress Anna Wallace —daughter of wealthy landowner Hamish Wallace— who had a high-profile, serious relationship with Prince Charles (now King Charles III) in 1979 and 1980, that proposed twice, but she turned him down.

Paynter lived at Eaton Grange, at Eaton, Leicestershire.
