= 1910 Birthday Honours =

Awards given in honor of King Edward VII

The 1910 Birthday Honours for the British Empire were announced on 24 June, to mark the occasion of the day set apart to celebrate the birthday of the late King Edward VII, who had died on 6 May. In the circumstances, the list was notably shorter than in preceding years.

The recipients of honours are displayed here as they were styled before their new honour, and arranged by honour, with classes (Knight, Knight Grand Cross, etc.) and then divisions (Military, Civil, etc.) as appropriate.

== The Most Honourable Order of the Bath ==
=== Knight Grand Cross of the Order of the Bath (GCB) ===
Military Division

- General Sir Ian Standish Monteith Hamilton, K.C.B., D.S.O., Colonel, The Queen's Own Cameron Highlanders, Adjutant-General to the Forces (2nd Military Member, Army Council).

Civil Division

- The Right Honourable Sir Charles Hardinge, G.C.M.G., G.C.V.O., C.B., I.S.O.

=== Knight Commander of the Order of the Bath (KCB) ===
Military Division

- Inspector-General of Hospitals and Fleets James Porter, C.B., M.D., K.H.P.
- Vice-Admiral Sir Percy Moreton Scott, K.C.V.O., C.B.
- Vice-Admiral George Le Clerc Egerton, C.B.
- Vice-Admiral Sir George Astley Callaghan, K.C.V.O., C.B.
- Rear-Admiral Sir Henry Bradwardine Jackson, K.C.V.O., F.R.S.
- Major-General Wykeham Leigh Pemberton, C.B., Colonel Commandant, The King's Royal Rifle Corps.
- Major-General Sir Stuart Brownlow Beatson, K.C.S.I., C.B., Indian Army, Extra Equerry to His Majesty The King.
- Major-General Frederick William Benson, C.B., Colonel, 21st Lancers.
- Lieutenant-General Alfred Robert Martin, C.B., Indian Army, Commander, 2nd (Rawalpindi) Division.

Civil Division

- Engineer Vice-Admiral Henry John Oram, C.B., Engineer-in-Chief of the Fleet.
- Honorary Colonel Sir Thomas Charlton Meyrick, Bart., C.B., Honorary Colonel of the 3rd Battalion, The King's (Shropshire Light Infantry).
- Honorary Colonel William Watts, C.B., Honorary Colonel of the 1st Cadet Battalion, The King's Royal Rifle Corps, late Lieutenant-Colonel commanding 3rd Battalion, Welsh Regiment.
- Colonel Robert Henry Anstice, C.B., late 1st Aberdeen Royal Engineers (Volunteers).
- The Right Honourable Sir James Brown Dougherty, C.V.O., C.B.
- Sir Edward Richard Henry, K.C.V.O., C.S.I.
- Lawrence Nunns Guillemard, Esq., C.B.
- John Struthers, Esq., C.B.

=== Companion of the Order of the Bath (CB) ===
Military Division

- Major-General Gerald Charles Kitson, C.V.O., C.M.G., Quartermaster-General in India.
- Surgeon-General Arthur Thomas Sloggett, C.M.G., Principal Medical Officer, India.
- Major-General Edward Charles William Mackenzie-Kennedy, Indian Army, Brigade Commander, Belgaum Brigade.
- Major-General Hamilton Bower, Indian Army, Brigade Commander, Assam Brigade.
- Surgeon-General Owen Edward Pennefather Lloyd, V.C., Principal Medical Officer, South Africa.
- Major-General Arthur Pole Penton, C.V.O., Commanding Royal Artillery, Malta.
- Colonel Hugh Montgomerie Sinclair, Chief Engineer, Scottish Command.
- Colonel Arthur Edmund Sandbach, D.S.O., Half-pay.
- Colonel Cooper Penrose, Chief Engineer, Coast Defences, Southern Command.
- Colonel James Reginald Maitland Dalrymple-Hay, D.S.O., Half-pay.
- Colonel (temporary Brigadier-General) Frederick Campbell, D.S.O., Indian Army, Brigade Commander, Garhwal Brigade.
- Colonel Henry Fuller Maitland Wilson, General Staff Officer, 1st Grade, India.
- Colonel (temporary Brigadier-General) Thompson Capper, D.S.O., Commandant, Staff College, India.
- Colonel (temporary Brigadier-General) Frederick Crofton Heath, Inspector of Royal Engineers.
- Colonel Frederick William Nicholas McCracken, D.S.O., General Staff Officer, 1st Grade, India.
- Colonel Alexander John Godley, Half-pay.
- Colonel (temporary Brigadier-General) William Lewis White, Inspector of Royal Garrison Artillery.
- Colonel Walter Robert Butler Doran, D.S.O., General Staff Officer, 1st Grade, 5th Division, Irish Command.
- Colonel (temporary Brigadier-General) Norman Bruce Inglefield, D.S.O., Officer Commanding South Irish Coast Defences.
- Colonel Francis Becon Longe, Surveyor General of India.
- Colonel (temporary Brigadier-General) Richard Cyril Byrne Hairing, Brigadier-General, General Staff, Southern Command.
- Colonel Fitzgerald Wintour, General Staff Officer, 1st Grade, Northern Command.
- Colonel Edward Charles Ingouville-Williams, D.S.O., Commandant, School of Mounted Infantry, Longmoor.
- Colonel Charles Prideaux Triscott, D.S.O., Half-pay.
- Colonel John Philip Du Cane, General Staff Officer, 1st Grade, War Office.
- Colonel William Henry Rycroft, Half-pay.
- Colonel Michael William Kerin.
- Colonel Charles Delme-Radcliffe, C.V.O., C.M.G., Military Attache (General Staff Officer, 2nd Grade) Rome and Berne.

Civil Division

- Thomas Sims, Esq., assistant director of Works.
- Lieutenant-Colonel and Honorary Colonel Mackay John Graham Scobie, Commanding 1st Battalion, The Herefordshire Regiment.
- Lieutenant-Colonel and Honorary Colonel John William Robinson Parker, Commanding 3rd Battalion, The East Lancashire Regiment.
- Colonel Edward Satterthwaite, Brigade Commander, Kent Brigade, Territorial Force.
- Frederick Atterbury, Esq.
- Colin George Campbell, Esq.
- Edward Crabb, Esq.
- Joshua Albert Flynn, Esq.
- Richard Tetley Glazebrook, Esq., F.R.S.
- Ronald Graham, Esq.
- Henry Charles Millar Lambert, Esq.
- Oswyn Alexander Ruthven Murray, Esq.
- William Payne Perry, Esq.

== Order of the Star of India ==
=== Companion of the Order of the Star of India (CSI) ===
- Robert Warrand Carlyle, Esq., C.I.E., Indian Civil Service, Secretary to the Government of India in the Department of Revenue and Agriculture, and an Additional Member of the Council of the Governor-General for making Laws and Regulations.
- Surgeon-General Charles Pardey Lukis, M.D., F.R.C.S., Honorary Surgeon to the Viceroy, Director-General, Indian Medical Service, and an Additional Member of the Council of the Governor-General for making Laws and Regulations.
- Duncan Colvin Baillie, Esq., Indian Civil Service, Member, Board of Revenue, and a Member of the Council of the Lieutenant-Governor of the United Provinces for making Laws and Regulations.
- Walter Francis Rice, Esq., Indian Civil Service, Chief Secretary to the Government of Burma, and a Member of the Council of the Lieutenant-Governor of Burma for making Laws and Regulations.
- Alexander Gordon Cardew, Esq., Indian Civil Service, Secretary to the Government of Madras, Revenue Department, and an Additional Member of the Council of the Governor of Fort St. George for making Laws and Regulations.
- Frederick William Duke, Esq., Indian Civil Service, Chief Secretary to the Government of Bengal.
- Havilland LeMesurier, Esq., C.I.E., Indian Civil Service, Chief Secretary to the Government of Eastern Bengal and Assam.
- Claude Hamilton Archer Hill, Esq., C.I.E., Indian Civil Service, Agent to the Governor in Kathiawar.
- Cecil Edward Francis Bunbury, Esq., Indian Civil Service, Judicial Commissioner, North-West Frontier Province.

== Order of Saint Michael and Saint George ==
=== Knight Grand Cross of the Order of St Michael and St George (GCMG) ===
- Sir Arthur Henry Hardinge, K.C.B., K.C.M.G., His Majesty's Envoy Extraordinary and Minister Plenipotentiary to His Majesty the King of the Belgians.

=== Knight Commander of the Order of St Michael and St George (KCMG) ===
- Colonel Eric John Eagles Swayne, C.B., Governor and Commander-in-Chief of the Colony of British Honduras.
- Lieutenant-Colonel the Honourable Newton James Moore, C.M.G., Premier and Colonial Treasurer of the State of Western Australia.
- The Honourable William Hall-Jones, High Commissioner in London for the Dominion of New Zealand.
- Frederick James Mirrielees, Esq., of Messrs Donald Currie and Company.
- William Chauncy Cartwright, Esq., C.M.G., Chief Clerk of the Financial Department of the Foreign Office.
- Sir William Ward, Kt, C.V.O., His Majesty's Consul-General at Hamburg.
- Arthur Chitty, Esq., C.M.G., late Adviser to the Ministry of the Interior at Cairo.

=== Companion of the Order of St Michael and St George (CMG) ===
- Robert Norman Bland, Esq., Resident Councillor, Penang, Straits Settlements.
- Atlee Arthur Hunt, Esq., Secretary of the Department of External Affairs, Commonwealth of Australia.
- John Gunion Rutherford, Esq., Veterinary Director-General and Live Stock Commissioner, Department of Agriculture of the Dominion of Canada.
- Thomas Laurence Roxburgh, Esq., Administrator of the Presidency of Saint Christopher and Nevis.
- Aubrey Dallas Percival Hodges, Esq., M.D., Principal Medical Officer, Uganda Protectorate; in recognition of services in the suppression of Sleeping-Sickness.
- Colonel John Edmond Gough, V.C., A.D.C.; in recognition of services in Somaliland.
- Colonel Nicola Grech-Biancardi, C.V.O., Collector of Customs of the Island of Malta.
- The Honourable Robert Henry Brand; in recognition of services as Secretary to the Central South African Railways Board.
- John Mensah Sarbah, Esq., Barrister-at-Law, Unofficial Member of the Legislative Council of the Gold Coast Colony.
- Tannatt William Edgeworth David, Esq., F.R.S., Professor of Geology and Physical Geography in the University of Sydney.
- Harry Harling Lamb, Esq., His Majesty's Consul-General at Salonica.
- Edward Charles Blech, Esq., His Majesty's Consul-General at Port Said.
- James William Jamieson, Esq., His Majesty's Consul-General at Canton.
- Murdoch Macdonald, Esq., M.Inst.C.E., Director-General of Reservoirs in Egypt.
- Commodore Cecil Fiennes Thursby, Commanding the Royal Naval Barracks, Chatham.

== Order of the Indian Empire ==
=== Knight Grand Commander of the Order of the Indian Empire (GCIE) ===
- Maharaja Peshkar Sir Kishan Parshad, K.C.I.E., Yamin-us-Sultanat, Minister to His Highness the Nizam of Hyderabad.

=== Knight Commander of the Order of the Indian Empire (KCIE) ===
- Major-General Robert Irvin Scallon, C.B., C.I.E., D.S.O., Indian Army, Secretary to the Government of India in the Army Department, and an Additional Member of the Council of the Governor-General for making Laws and Regulations.
- John David Rees, Esq., C.V.O., C.I.E., M.P.

=== Companion of the Order of the Indian Empire (CIE) ===
- Joseph John Mullaly, Esq., M.I.C.E., Chief Engineer and Secretary to the Government of the Punjab, Public Works Department, Irrigation Branch.
- William Didsbury Sheppard, Esq., Indian Civil Service, lately Municipal Commissioner for the City of Bombay.
- Colonel Roderick Macrae, M.B., Indian Medical Service (retired), lately Inspector-General of Civil Hospitals, Bengal.
- Lieutenant-Colonel Victor Reginald Brooke, D.S.O., 9th Lancers, Military Secretary to His Excellency the Viceroy.
- Oswald Vivian Bosanquet, Esq., Indian Civil Service, Resident at Baroda.
- Tanjore Madava Rao Ananda Rao, Esq., Dewan of Mysore.
- John Hubert Marshall, Esq., Director-General of Archaeology in India.
- William Arthur Johns, Esq., Officiating Manager, Oudh and Rohilkhand Railway, Lucknow.
- Charles Michie Smith, Esq., B.Sc., F.R.A.S., F.R.S.E., Director of the Kodaikanal and Madras Observatories.
- Marc Aurel Stein, Esq., M.A., Ph.D., Inspector-General of Education and Archaeological Surveyor, North-West Frontier Province.
- Lieutenant-Colonel Arthur Grey, lately Commandant, Punjab Light Horse.

== Royal Victorian Order ==
=== Member of the Royal Victorian Order, 4th class ===
- Joseph Hillier Hillier, Esq.

=== Member of the Royal Victorian Order, 5th class ===
- Francis Reginald Engelbach, Esq.
- George Bathurst Long, Esq.

== Imperial Service Order ==
- Bloomtield Wilson Baber, Esq., Colonial Engineer, Public Works Department of the Colony of British Honduras.
- John D'Aeth, Esq., M.Inst.C.E., assistant director of Public Works of the Island of Jamaica.
- Lieutenant-Colonel Edward Campbell Davies, Factory Engineer, Public Works Department, Island of Ceylon.
- Alfred Edward Eames, Esq., Controller, Central Telegraph Office, General Post Office.
- Achille Frechette, Esq., Chief of the Translation Branch, House of Commons of the Dominion of Canada.
- William Gallagher, Esq., Assistant Chief Inspector, Customs and Excise.
- Arthur Middleton Gilbert, Esq., Clerk in Charge of Accounts, Board of Education.
- Robert Rowan Purdon Hickson, Esq., M.Inst.C.E., President of the Sydney Harbour Trust Commission.
- John William Israel, Esq., Auditor-General for the Commonwealth of Australia.
- James Juleff, Esq., Comptroller of Accounts and Stores, Prison Commission.
- John Christopher Lewis, Esq., lately Postmaster of San Fernando, Trinidad.
- John Henry Mclllree, Esq., Assistant Commissioner, Royal North-West Mounted Police Force, Dominion of Canada.
- Colonel Lewis George Madley, Commissioner of Police of the State of South Australia..
- Francis William Major, Esq., Chief of Customs, East Africa Protectorate.
- John Kenneth Murray Ross, Esq., Collector of Customs of the Colony of Fiji.
- Arthur William Norman, Esq., Assistant-Secretary, Estate Duty Office, Inland Revenue.
- William John Ptolemy, Esq., Deputy Provincial Treasurer of the province of Manitoba.
- Frederick Shaw, Esq., Chief Superintendent, Mercantile Marine Offices, Cardiff and Newport.
- Harry Tomlinson, Esq., Principal Clerk, Pay Office.
- Charles Owen Waterhouse, Esq., Assistant Keeper, British Museum.
- Frederick Benjamin Wood, Esq., His Majesty's Consul, Patras.
