= Victorian Mounted Rifles =

Regiment in the Second Boer War

The Victorian Mounted Rifles (VMR) was a regiment composed of Australian forces that served in the Second Boer War. It was first raised by Colonel Tom Price in the mid-1880s, composed of voluntary forces. It was composed of several contingents, the most notable being the 5th Victorian Mounted Rifles.

== Composition ==
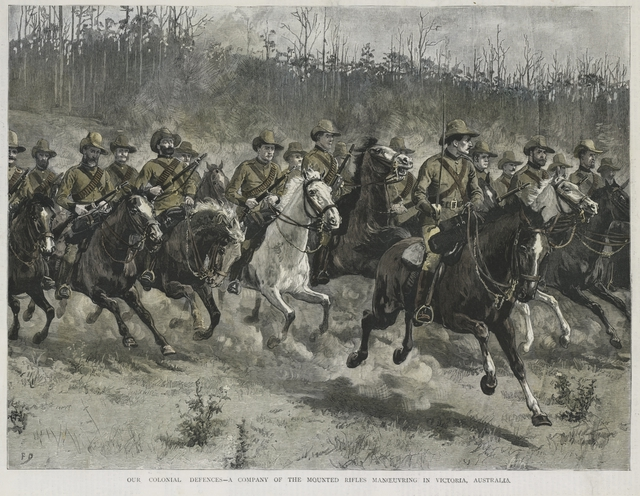
A Company of the Victorian Mounted Rifles on manoeuvres in Victoria in 1889.

=== 2nd Victorian Mounted Rifles ===
This was led by Colonel Thomas Price in the Second Boer War.

=== 5th Victorian Mounted Rifles ===
The 5th contingent enrolled for the Second Boer War in February 1901, leaving for South Africa in mid-February. The regiment was mobilised at Pretoria between 24 March and 4 April 1901. It saw considerable action during the Second Boer War when it was used to combat the guerilla warfare tactics of the Boers. Leslie Cecil Maygar was awarded the Victoria Cross for gallant acts during the Second Boer War whilst enlisted in 5 VMR.

The Regiment came into controversy after an attack on their camp at Wilmansrust. The 5th saw heavy casualties with the Regimental surgeon, and 18 NCOs and men killed; five officers and 36 NCOs and men were wounded. The Officer in Charge of the column, Major-General Sir Stuart Brownlow Beatson, K.C.B., K.C.S.I., K.C.V.O. (1854–1914), was not satisfied with the actions of the Victorian Mounted Rifles and was quoted as saying: "I tell you what I think. The Australians are a damned fat, round shouldered, useless crowd of wasters . . . In my opinion they are a lot of white-livered curs . . . You can add dogs too." He charged three men—Troopers James Steele (1142), Arthur Richards (1272) and Herbert Henry Parry (1335).—of the VMR for inciting mutiny and after a summary Court Martial, he sentenced them to death. This sentence was commuted by General Kitchener who was in charge of all allied forces. The reduced sentences were debated in both the Australian and British Parliaments and were eventually commuted.

When the 5th VMR departed from South Africa, Lord Kitchener sent the CO this telegram:

"11 March 1902,
Cape Town,
Please Convey to your Australians my warm appreciation of their gallant and arduous service in this country. In the name of the Army in South Africa, I wish them good luck and God speed."
