= Thomas Price (soldier) =

- Born: 21 October 1842; Hobart, Van Diemen's Land
- Died: 3 July 1911 (aged 68); Warrnambool, Victoria
- Burial place: Melbourne General Cemetery
- Military career
- Allegiance: United Kingdom
- Branch: British Indian Army; Victoria Military Force
- Service years: 1861–1883; 1885–1904
- Rank: Colonel
- Commands: Victorian Mounted Rifles; Victorian Rangers
- Conflicts: Second Boer War
- Awards: Companion of the Order of the Bath; Mentioned in Despatches

Thomas Caradoc Rose Price CB (21 October 1842 – 3 July 1911), often known as Colonel Tom Price, was an Australian soldier, and acting commandant of the Commonwealth Military Forces in Victoria in 1902. Joining the British Indian Army in his early years, he served 20 years in India before returning to Australia. In 1885, he raised the Victorian Mounted Rifles, and was instrumental in establishing the concept of light horse units within the Australian Army. In 1900, he led a Victorian contingent during the Second Boer War, and was the only Australian officer during that war to command a force of British regulars. He remained in the Australian military after the war, serving in Queensland until 1904 when he was medically discharged. He retired to Victoria again and died in 1911 at the age of 68.

== Early life ==
Price was born in Hobart, Tasmania, on 21 October 1842. He was the fourth son of John Price, a police magistrate and convict superintendent, who was the fourth son of Cornish Australian Sir Rose Price, 1st Baronet of the Price Baronets. He received some basic education in Hobart and from 1854 was educated at Scotch College, Melbourne. In December 1859, he entered the East India Military College, in Addiscombe, England, and was commissioned in 1861 into the Madras Infantry.

== Military career ==
Price undertook twenty years of service in India with several different regiments, during which time he was also seconded as a police superintendent. He retired from the army in 1883 with the rank of lieutenant colonel and returned to Australia, securing a plot of farm land around Heidelberg, Victoria. In 1885, he was appointed to the Victorian Military Forces, taking up a commission as an officer in its small permanent force. He subsequently formed the Victorian Mounted Rifles, an early light horse unit that helped establish the concept within the Australian military, which was raised from volunteers recruited from men based in rural Victoria. In establishing his new unit, Price obtained permission to dress them in khaki, instead of the red or blue uniforms that had been common at the time. He also instituted the slouch hat as an item of their uniform, which subsequently became a defining icon of the modern Australian Army. In 1888, he briefly took command of the Victorian Rangers, commanding them until 1889. During a civil disturbance in Melbourne in 1890 when maritime workers went on strike, Price's unit was called out to aid civilian police. The orders that he gave to his men to fire on the strikers if necessary later led to him being criticised by Premier Duncan Gillies and appearing before a court of inquiry. In the end, his actions were upheld and ultimately the strike was resolved peacefully.

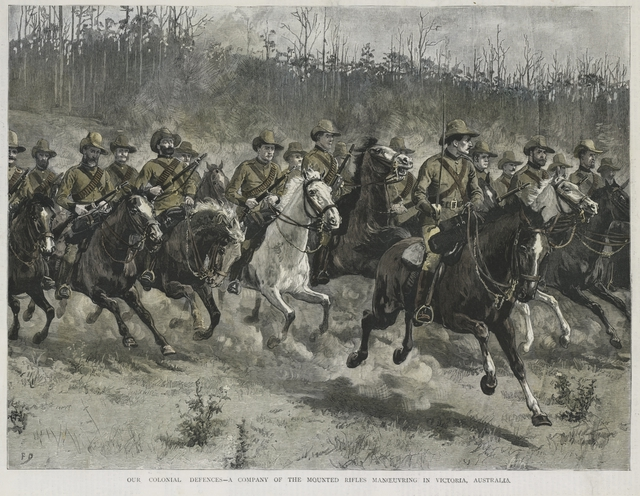
A Company of the Victorian Mounted Rifles on manoeuvres in Victoria in 1889.

In 1900, Price saw action in South Africa in the Second Boer War in command of the second Victorian contingent and was mentioned in despatches. He also commanded a force that included British regulars during the conflict, the only Australian commander to do so during the war. After his return from South Africa, he was briefly assigned the position of State commandant of the Victorian forces. This was the second highest position available to an officer at the time in Australia. He held the position between March and July 1902, before relinquishing the position to assume the same role in Queensland. He served there until he retired, medically unfit, in August 1904.

== Later life ==
Following his discharge, Price retired to Warrnambool, Victoria, his health having been affected by his services in India and South Africa. He lived there until his death on 3 July 1911. He was buried with military honours in the Melbourne General Cemetery. He married twice, firstly in 1874 to Mary, daughter of Thomas Baillie, who died in 1899, and secondly in 1902 to Emeline Shadforth, daughter of the Robert Reid. Emeline survived him with three sons; Price's daughter from his first marriage also survived him. He was appointed a Companion of the Order of the Bath in 1900. One of his sons died on active service with the Royal Navy during World War I, while another reached the rank of brigadier in the British Army.
