= Sir Charles Leopold Cust, 3rd Baronet =

Royal Navy officer and courtier

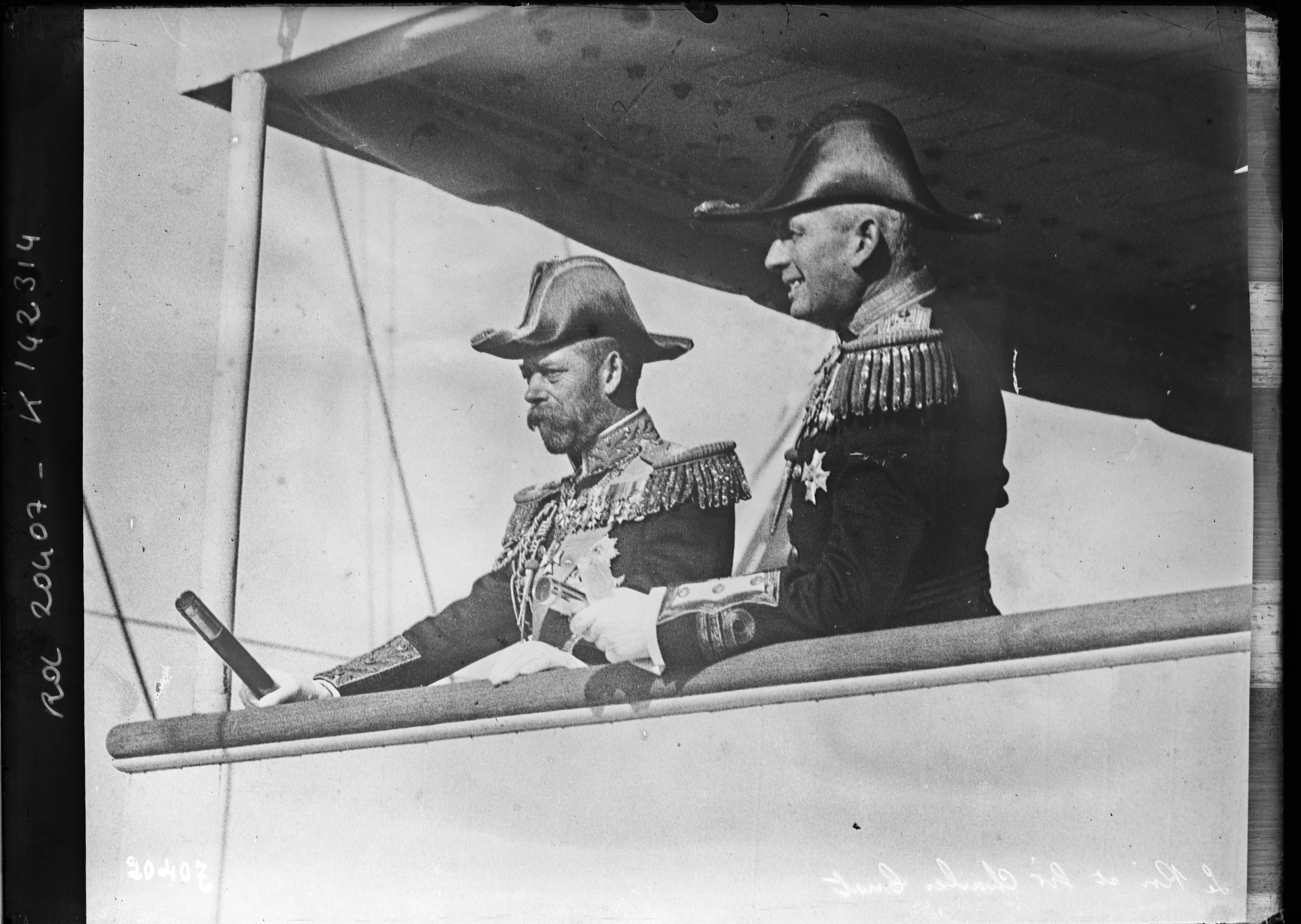
Sir Charles Cust (right) photographed at the 1912 Weymouth naval review alongside George V

Captain Sir Charles Leopold Cust, 3rd Baronet GCVO CB CMG CIE (27 February 1864 – 19 January 1931) was a British Royal Navy officer and long-serving courtier in the Household of George V and Mary.

== Biography ==
Cust was born in Shropshire, the son of Sir Leopold Cust, 2nd Baronet (1831–1878) and Charlotte Sobieski Isabel Bridgeman (d.1914), daughter of Vice-Admiral Hon. Charles Orlando Bridgeman. He was the brother of Aleen Cust. In 1878, he succeeded to his father's baronetcy.

He entered the Royal Navy in 1877, joining the cadet training ship HMS Britannia at Dartmouth, Devon. As a midshipman he saw action in the Anglo-Egyptian War in 1882, for which he was awarded the Egypt Medal and the Khedive's Star. In 1886 Cust was commissioned as a sub-lieutenant. In the navy he became a close personal friend of the young Duke of York, who was his contemporary on Britannia. He served subsequently on the warships on HMS Minotaur, HMS Alexandra and HMS Thunderer. In 1889, Cust was appointed to serve on the royal yacht, HMY Osborne. In 1892, he was appointed equerry in waiting to the Duke of York, and in 1901 he resigned his commission to serve full-time at court.

As a trusted courtier, he accompanied the future George V on multiple imperial tours, including the 1901 voyage to Australia to open the first federal Parliament, and a tour of India in 1905–6. Following that visit, in 1906 he was made a Companion of the Order of the Indian Empire. Cust compiled an extensive collection of photographs of the four-month tour of India, including photos of key locations, the Prince and Princess of Wales, local people, Royal Household staff, hunts and various other activities. He retained his position in the royal household upon the accession of George V to the throne in 1910, and continued to be among the king's closest and most trusted companions. Cust was appointed a Knight Commander of the Royal Victorian Order in the 1911 Coronation Honours. He was promoted to Knight Grand Cross in the 1919 New Year Honours.

Cust was a Fellow of the Royal Institution and a fellow of the Royal Geographical Society, the Zoological Society of London and the Royal Horticultural Society. He died without heirs at the age of 66 in 1931, at which point his baronetcy became extinct. He is buried in the churchyard of St Peter and St Paul's Church, Belton.

His portrait, by John Mansfield Crealock, is in the collection at Belton House, the former family seat of Cust's relations, the Barons Brownlow. Cust features in many photographs of the royal household held by the Royal Collection.

Baronetage of the United Kingdom
Preceded by Leopold Cust	Baronet (of Leasowe Castle); 1878–1931	Extinct
