= Montagu Grant Wilkinson =

UK soldier in Africa (1857–1943)

- Born: 13 March 1857; Bombay
- Died: 28 November 1943 (aged 86); Bracknell
- Military career
- Allegiance: United Kingdom
- Branch: British Army
- Rank: Brigadier-General
- Conflicts: Nile Expedition; Suakin Expedition; Mahdist War; Second Boer War; First World War
- Awards: CB CMG MVO

Montagu Grant Wilkinson CB CMG MVO (1857–1943) was a soldier, who served in Africa during the Mahdist War and Second Boer War, and on the Western Front as Commander of the 15th (Scottish) Division during World War One. He later served as a Gentleman Usher to King George V until 1927, then an Extra Gentleman Usher to George V, King Edward VII and King George VI.

== Early life ==
Born in Bombay on 13 March 1857., the son of Montagu C. Wilkinson D.L, and educated at Harrow and the Royal Military College. Whilst at Harrow Wilkinson played cricket for the school, including opening the batting for Harrow in the 1875 Eton v Harrow match at Lord's.

== Early military service ==
After being gazetted as a Second Lieutenant on 30 January 1878 into the 2nd Battalion, King's Own Scottish Borderers, Wilkinson was gazetted as a Lieutenant on 17 April 1879 and appointed a probationer for the Indian Staff Corps.

After taking part in the Nile Expedition of 1884-85 as Transport Officer where his service earned the Khedive's Star, Wilkinson served as Adjutant in the Suakin Expedition and took part in the action at Gemaizah and was mentioned in dispatches afterwards being gazetted as Adjutant to the 3rd Battalion on 15 August 1889. Whilst a Major in 1899, Wilkinson reported, and was then called to give evidence at the subsequent court case, involving an incident of cruelty to a horse. Wilkinson was praised as "doing a great public service" after the resulting conviction

== Second Boer War ==
Remaining with the regiment, Wilkinson served as Assistant Provost marshal on the staff of General Thomas Kelly-Kenny in the Second Boer War and was involved in the Relief of Kimberley, the Battle of Paardeberg, the Battle of Poplar Grove and the Battle of Driefontein , before commanding the 1st Battalion King's Own Scottish Borderers in Transvaal during April and May 1902.

== Interwar years ==
After the end of the war Wilkinson reverted to half-pay and was appointed as commandant of the School of Musketry in South Africa, before being appointed as commandant of the Queen Victoria School in Dunblane, Scotland, on 1 July 1908 a post he held until 1914, and inducted into the Royal Victorian Order (Fourth Class) on 4 October 1909 by which time he had risen to the rank of colonel. During this time he also served as district inspector of musketry in Scotland, the Home District and on Salisbury Plain.

== First World War service ==
After retiring in March 1914 Wilkinson rejoined the army on the outbreak of war and was appointed as brigade commander of the 44th brigade, 15th Scottish Division and was granted the temporary rank of brigadier general on 24 September while employed in this role. The Division landed in France in July 1915, with Wilkinson leading the 44th Brigade in the Battle of Loos. He was made Second Class in the Royal Victorian Order on 14 January 1916 and invalided back to England on 21 April 1916. After returning to England, Wilkinson married Lina Dick at St Michael's Church, Chester Square in Belgravia in November 1916 and served with the Home Counties Reserve Brigade. He would later contribute an essay on the history of the King's Own Scottish Borderers to a book written by Sir Herbert Maxwell, 7th Baronet, published in 1918 and was gazetted as President of the Area Quartering Committee on 16 April 1918

== Royal service ==
Having risen further to Brigadier-general Wilkinson was appointed as a Gentleman Usher to the King on 1 April 1919, becoming an Extra Gentleman Usher on 22 April 1927. He held this role under the reign of King Edward VIII and King George VI. In later life he also served as chairman of the Central Committee of the Regimental Agency, a charity with royal patronage.

== Honours ==
Wilkinson was appointed a Companion of the Order of St Michael and St George (CMG) in the 1919 Birthday Honours of King George V, and later appointed Commander of the Royal Victorian Order (CVO) in the 1927 Birthday Honours list.

== Death ==
Wilkinson died at the age of 86 in Bracknell, Berkshire on 28 November 1943. His private papers are held at the Imperial War Museum
