= Edward Wallington (courtier) =

English cricketer, colonial administrator, Royal Household member

Personal information
- Full name: Edward William Wallington
- Born: 7 December 1854; Oakley, Hampshire, England
- Died: 12 December 1933 (aged 79); Widcombe, Somerset, England
- Batting: Right-handed
- Bowling: Right-arm underarm slow

Domestic team information
- Years: Team
- 1875–1877: Oxford University
- 1885: Marylebone Cricket Club

Career statistics
Competition	First-class
Matches	6
Runs scored	100
Batting average	12.50
100s/50s	–/–
Top score	38
Catches/stumpings	3/–
- Source: Cricinfo, 6 June 2020

Sir Edward William Wallington GCVO CMG (7 December 1854 – 12 December 1933) was an English first-class cricketer, colonial administrator in Australia and a member of the British Royal Household.

The son of Sir John Wallington, he was born in December 1854 at Oakley, Hampshire. He was educated at Sherborne School, before going up to Oriel College, Oxford. While studying at Oxford, he played first-class cricket for Oxford University, making his debut against the Marylebone Cricket Club (MCC) in 1875. He did not feature for Oxford in 1876, but did play a further four matches in 1877, including in that years University Match. He scored 100 runs in his five matches for Oxford, at an average of 14.28 and with a high score of 38. Wallington later played a single first-class match for the MCC against Oxford University in 1885, in addition to playing minor matches for Wiltshire. He was described as a cricketer by Scores and Biographies as “a good batsman with steady defence, a slow under-hand bowler and fields well, generally taking point, cover-point or short leg.”

Entering into the Civil Service from Oxford, Wallington later served as private secretary to Lord Carrington, the Governor of New South Wales, from 1885 to 1889, before serving as private secretary from 1889–96 to both Lord Hopetoun and Lord Brassey during their terms as Governor of Victoria. He then served in the same capacity from 1896 to 1900 for Sir Thomas Buxton and Lord Tennyson during their terms as Governor of South Australia. In 1901, he served Lord Hopetoun when he was appointed the first Governor-General of Australia, while in the same year he was made a Companion to the Order of St Michael and St George in 1901.

Returning to the United Kingdom, he was appointed Groom of the Bedchamber to the Prince of Wales (later King George V) on 2 February 1903, serving his son Prince Edward, a position within the Royal household he would hold until 1910. From 1910, he served in the Royal Household as Groom of the Bedchamber in Waiting to King George V, alongside serving as private secretary and treasurer to the Queen during the same period. He retired from his duties with the Royal Household in 1932, during which time he was honoured as a Commander of the Royal Victorian Order in the 1910 Birthday Honours, which was elevated to Knight Commander in the 1916 Birthday Honours, and Knight Grand Cross of the Royal Victorian Order in the 1929 Birthday Honours. Wallington died a year after retiring from the Royal Household, in December 1933 at Widcombe, Somerset.
