= Milsom Rees =

Welsh surgeon

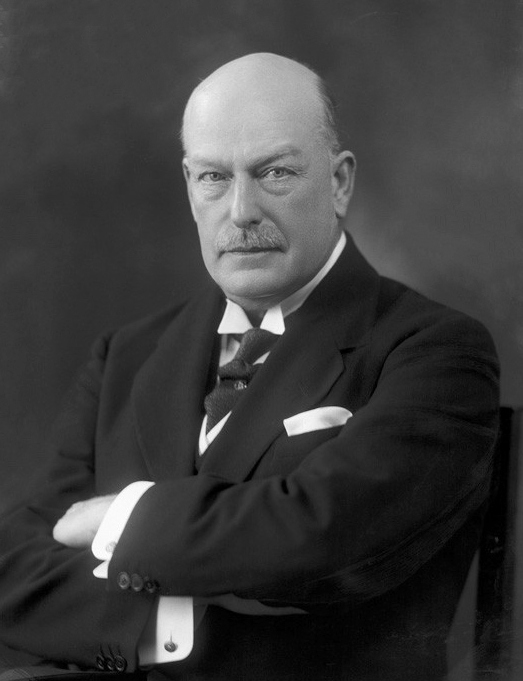
Milsom Rees in 1931

Sir John Milsom Rees GCVO (20 April 1866 – 25 April 1952) was a Welsh surgeon and a specialist in laryngology.

Born in Neath in 1866, he studied medicine at St Bartholomew's Hospital in London. After qualifying as a Fellow of the Royal College of Surgeons (FRCS) at Edinburgh, he obtained the post of surgeon in the Ear, Nose and Throat Department at the Prince of Wales General Hospital in Tottenham.

He also practised privately at 18 Upper Wimpole Street and was employed as a consultant by the Royal Opera House, Covent Garden. The singers he attended included Adelina Patti, Nellie Melba, and Kirsten Flagstad.

Appointed Laryngologist to His Majesty's Household in 1910, Rees also treated King George V of the United Kingdom as well as several other members of the royal family. He was knighted in 1916 and created Knight Commander of the Royal Victorian Order (KCVO) in 1923 and Knight Grand Cross (GCVO) in 1934 for his services to the royal household. In 1931 the University of Wales awarded him the honorary degree of Doctor of Science.

== Personal life ==
After retirement, Rees resided in Broadstairs, Kent, England where he died in 1952.

=== Legacy ===
A memorial plaque at 18 Upper Wimpole Street was unveiled by Donald Harrison, president of the Royal Society of Medicine, in 1996.
