= Richard Cruise =

English ophthalmic surgeon (1876–1946)

Portrait by Walter Stoneman, 1922

Sir Richard Robert Cruise, GCVO, FRCS (27 October 1876 – 24 December 1946) was an English ophthalmic surgeon. He was Surgeon-Oculist to George V and Queen Mary.

== Early life ==
Cruise was born in Purneah in the British Raj, to Francis Cruise (died 1879) and his wife Frideswide, daughter of Edward Kellet of Waterstown in county Meath. He was educated at Harrow School.

== Career ==
Cruise trained at St Mary's Hospital and qualified as a Member of the Royal College of Surgeons and Licentiate of the Royal College of Physicians in 1900. He became an ophthalmologist and worked as a senior clinical assistant in that specialism at St Mary's. He was also the Chief Clinical Assistant at the Royal London Ophthalmic Hospital. In 1903, he was elected a Fellow of the Royal College of Surgeons. He worked as a surgeon at the Bristol Eye Hospital and the Royal Eye Hospital. In 1909, he was appointed to the Royal Westminster Ophthalmic Hospital, where he became a consulting surgeon. He was also appointed to that position at King Edward VII's Hospital in London. During the First World War, he was an officer in the Royal Army Medical Corps and invented a chain mail visor for soldiers (to protect them from being blinded by shrapnel) which was put into use in late 1917. Though they improved safety, the helmets were unpopular with soldiers, who found them distracting; Cruise developed a second model to address some of the complaints, though it is not clear that it was distributed during the war.

Cruise was ophthalmic surgeon to George V (reigned 1910–36); he was appointed a Commander of the Royal Victorian Order in 1917 and in 1918 he was appointed Surgeon-Oculist Extraordinary to the King. In 1922, he was promoted to Knight Commander. On the king's death in 1936, Cruise was appointed Surgeon-Oculist to Queen Mary, in which office he served till he died. He was promoted to Knight Grand Cross in 1936.

== Family and death ==
Twice married, Cruise's first wife was Margery Woolcombe-Boyce and his second was Eileen Greenlees; he had three children. Cruise died on 24 December 1946.

== Likenesses ==
The National Portrait Gallery, London houses eight portraits of Cruise.

== Publications ==
- Cruise, Richard R. (18 May 1940). "Visor for the Prevention of War Blindness". British Medical Journal. 1 (4141): 53–58. ISSN 0007-1447. PMC 2177268. PMID 2177268.
