= Bryan Godfrey-Faussett =

Captain Sir Bryan Godfrey-Faussett GCVO CMG
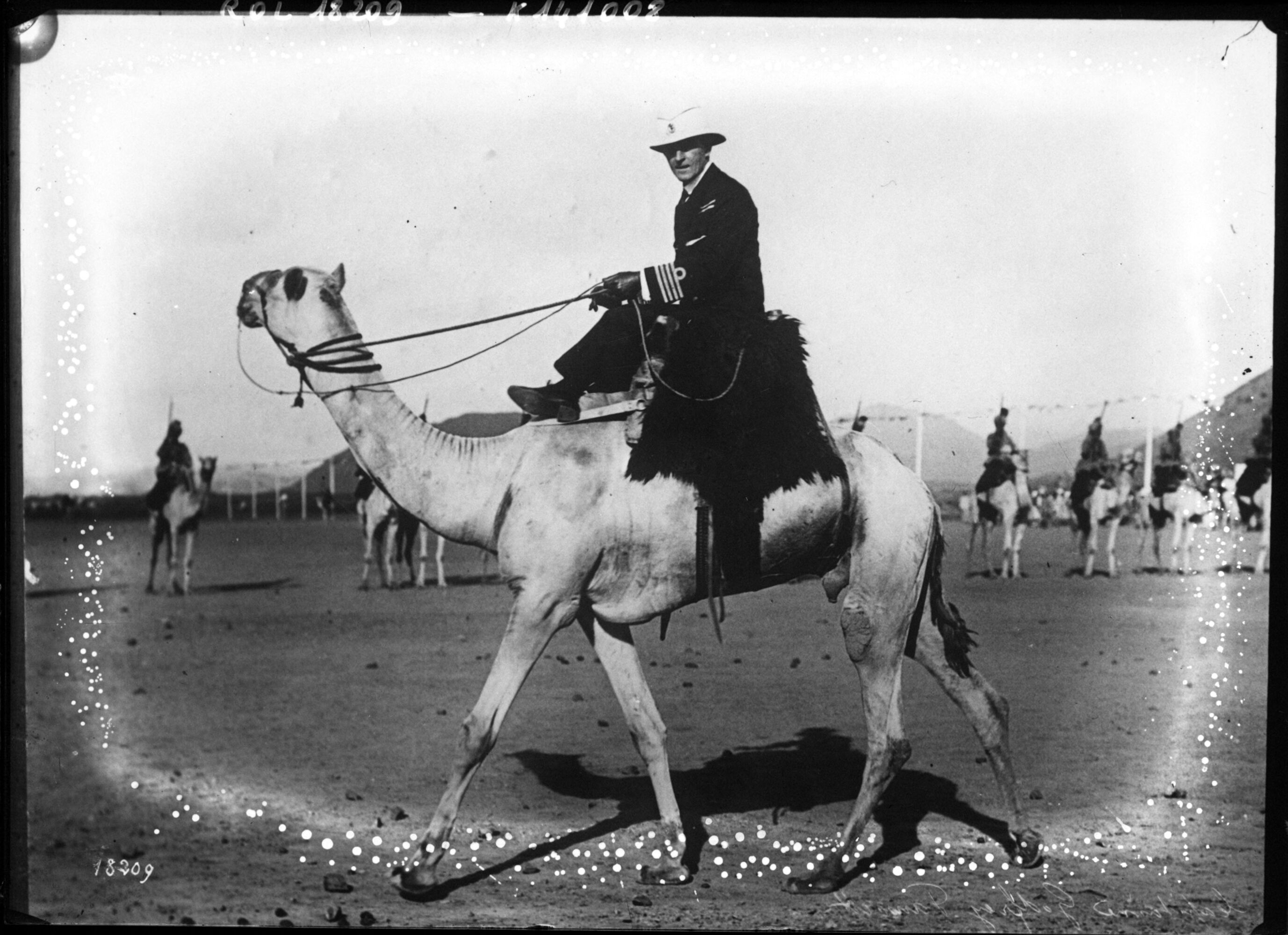
- Godfrey-Faussett photographed riding a camel in India in 1912
- Born: 30 October 1863
- Died: 20 September 1945 (aged 81)
- Spouse: Eugénie Fanny Eveline Dudley Ward
- Relatives: Rev. Bryan Faussett
- Military career
- Allegiance: British
- Branch: Navy
- Rank: Captain

Captain Sir Bryan Godfrey Godfrey-Faussett GCVO CMG (30 October 1863 – 20 September 1945) was a British naval officer and courtier. He was a friend of King George V, and served as aide-de-camp to the King.

== Early life and naval career ==
Godfrey-Faussett, a descendant of the archaeologist Rev. Bryan Faussett, was born in Waterford. He began his Royal Navy training aboard HMS Britannia in 1877, and subsequently became a midshipman in 1879 and a lieutenant in 1887. Aside from studies at the Royal Naval College, Greenwich and the Royal Naval College, Dartmouth from 1883 to 1884, he was at sea for much of this time in both home and foreign waters. Shortly after his promotion to lieutenant, he transferred to HMS Dolphin, but contracted a serious fever and was sent home from Port Said. He returned to the West Indies in 1889, after a year's convalescence, aboard HMS Bellerophon.

== Association with George V ==
In 1890, Godfrey-Faussett acted as unofficial aide-de-camp to the then Prince George of Wales, at the time still on active service with the Navy, during a visit to Canada. His naval career continued, briefly serving as an instructor on HMS Britannia, and including a posting to HMY Osborne, the royal yacht, from 1896 until 1897. He was promoted commander on 13 July 1899, but was soon after to be attached to Prince George's entourage again.

Godfrey-Faussett again served as aide-de-camp to the prince, now the Duke of Cornwall and York, during his tour of the British Empire from March–October 1901. Upon George's appointment as Prince of Wales in November 1901, Godfrey-Faussett was made his Equerry-in-Ordinary and accompanied the Prince and Princess on their visit to India from 1905 to 1906. In the latter year, he was promoted captain, made an MVO on 11 March 1906, and retired from active service on 31 October 1906 to attend the Prince.

In 1907, he married Eugénie Fanny Eveline Dudley Ward, by whom he had two sons: George Bryan (b. 1909) and David Frederick (b. 1913). Prince George and his wife were the godparents of the former, and their son Edward, then Prince of Wales, was the godfather of the latter, indicating Godfrey-Faussett's intimacy with the royal family. On 11 August 1908, he was made a CMG. Upon George's accession as George V, Godfrey-Faussett was made an Equerry-in-Ordinary to the King, travelled to India with the royal pair for their Delhi Durbar. On 19 June 1911, he was promoted a CVO.

== First World War and after ==
During the First World War, Godfrey-Faussett returned to active service in command of the auxiliary yacht 'Thistle' in 1914, and served as naval aide-de-camp to the King from 1915 until 1918, as well as a brief stint in the Paravane Department in 1917. This period brought him into contact with Admiral Beatty, made C-in-C in 1916 after the Battle of Jutland. Unfortunately, Beatty's marriage was failing disastrously at the time, and the result was to be a decade-long love affair between Beatty and Eugénie. After the war, in 1919, Godfrey-Faussett was promoted KCVO.

Godfrey-Faussett continued to serve as Equerry-in-Ordinary to King George until the monarch's death in 1936, receiving a promotion on 1 January 1932 to GCVO. During the reign of Edward VIII, he left his post as Equerry-in-Ordinary to become an Extra Equerry, on 21 July 1936. He remained an Extra Equerry to Edward VIII and George VI until his death in 1945.

He was survived by his elder son George; his younger son, David, one of the Swordfish pilots who attacked the Bismarck, was killed in 1942 when he flew into the sea during a night flight.
