= Walter Douglas Somerset Campbell =

Captain Sir Walter Douglas Somerset Campbell, KCVO (16 June 1840 – 17 April 1919) was a British soldier and courtier who served as Groom in Waiting to three British sovereigns and as Deputy Ranger of Windsor Great Park.

== Life ==
Walter Douglas Somerset Campbell was born on 16 June 1840, the son of Walter Frederick Campbell (1798–1855), of Islay and Woodhall, Lanark, MP, JP, DL, and his second wife Catherine, daughter of Stephen Thomas Cole and his wife, Lady Elizabeth Stanley. (Note: Sources disagree over the date of his birth: his entry in Who's Who gives the year 1853, and other works cite this year too; but Burke's Peerage give June 1840, a date used by Massue in The Plantagenet Roll and in family histories of the Campbells. His own gravestone gives 16 June 1840, and that is used in this article.) The Campbells were noted and well-connected land-owners in the Scottish highlands; the elder Walter Campbell inherited the lairdship of Islay from his grandfather in 1816 and sat as a Member of Parliament for Argyll; his first wife, Lady Eleanor Charteris (1796–1832), was the daughter of the 7th Earl of Wemyss and their son, John Francis, is remembered as a noted folklorist. Walter Frederick Campbell was nonetheless forced to sell Islay in 1847 to pay off enormous debts accrued during improvements to the island.

After schooling at Charterhouse, Campbell purchased a commission as an ensign in the 79th Foot in June 1860 and within a month was transferred to the 72nd Foot. He returned to his original regiment and in 1864 was promoted to lieutenant, this time without purchase; in 1877, he was promoted to captain. Three years later, Campbell was appointed an aide-de-camp to the lieutenant-general and governor-general of Ireland. Later that year, Queen Victoria appointed him one of her grooms-in-waiting, in succession to his elder brother, John Francis, who had resigned the post. The appointment was renewed by the Queen's son and successor, Edward VII, in 1901, and again by his successor George V in 1910. He was also deputy ranger of Windsor Great Park until he resigned in 1916. That year, he was made an Extra Groom-in-Waiting. As well as several foreign honours, Campbell was appointed firstly commander (1901) and then Knight Commander (1910) of the Royal Victorian Order. He died on 17 April 1919.

== Likenesses ==
- Included in a group portrait, The Royal Shooting Party, published by Rotary Photographic Co. Ltd, 14 November 1907 (bromide postcard print; 3 1/2 in × 5 3/8 in, 89 mm × 137 mm). Purchased by the National Portrait Gallery, London, in 1990, and catalogued as NPG x45128.

Other offices
Preceded by John Francis Campbell	Groom in Waiting to the British Sovereign; 1880–1916	Succeeded by Col. Hon. Claude Henry Comaraich Willoughby
