= Derek Keppel =

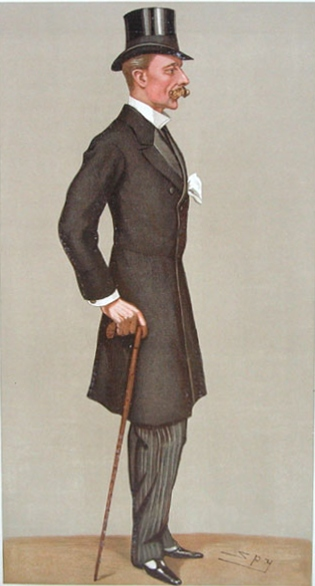
Sir Derek Keppel, by Leslie Ward.

Lieutenant Colonel Sir Derek William George Keppel GCVO KCB CMG CIE VD (7 April 1863 – 26 April 1944) was a member of the British Royal Household.

== Early life ==
Keppel was a son of the 7th Earl of Albemarle and was educated at Charterhouse School. He joined the army and rose to the rank of Lieutenant-Colonel in The Prince of Wales' Own Civil Service Rifles and served in India.

== Courtier ==
Keppel was appointed an equerry to the Duke of York in 1893, and was reappointed as such when the latter became Prince of Wales in 1901. On the Prince's accession as King George V in 1910, Keppel was appointed Deputy Master of the Household and in 1912 promoted to Master of the Household, serving in this post until the King's death in 1936. He continued as the only Master of the Household under King Edward VIII's short reign, and on the accession of King George VI he returned to being an equerry until his own death in 1944.

== Family ==
On 20 June 1898, he married Bridget Louisa Harbord, (later known as Lady Keppel), a daughter of the 5th Baron Suffield, and they had three daughters.

- Victoria Mary Joan Keppel (1899-1899) died in infancy
- Anne Keppel (1901-1951) married 1st Philip Mainwaring Broadmead, 1st Secretary in HM Diplomatic Service 14 Apr 1931 married secondly 2nd Col. Beresford Clayton Lockhart-Jervis in Apr 1936
- Victoria Winifred Keppel (1905-1976)

== Honours ==
British decorations

- CMG : Companion of the Order of St Michael and St George - 26 November 1901 - after accompanying the Prince of Wales on his 1901 Commonwealth tour
- CIE : Commander of the Order of the Indian Empire
- KCB : Knight Commander of the Order of the Bath
- GCVO: Knight Grand Cross of the Royal Victorian Order

Foreign decorations

- Czechoslovakia: Order of the White Lion

Preceded by Sir Charles Frederick	Master of the Household; 1913–1936	Succeeded by Sir Smith Child, 2nd Baronet
