= Philip Hunloke =

Sailor

Medal record

Sailing

Representing Great Britain

Olympic Games
Bronze medal – third place	1908 London	8 Metre

Major Sir Philip Hunloke GCVO (born Philip Perceval, 26 November 1868 – 1 April 1947) was a British sailor and courtier.

He was the son of Captain Philip Perceval of the Royal Horse Guards but changed his name in 1905. He was a crew member of the British boat Sorais, which won the bronze medal in the 8-metre class in the 1908 Summer Olympics.

He served as a Groom in Waiting to King George V from 1911 to 1936, to Edward VIII in 1936, and an extra groom-in-waiting to George VI from 1937 to 1947. He also served in the Boer War and First World War, reaching the rank of Major. He was Commodore of the Royal Yacht Club from 1943 until his death and was a Younger Brother at Trinity House.

He was the father of the Conservative MP Henry Hunloke. His maternal grandmother was Sophia Sidney, Baroness De L'Isle and Dudley, daughter of William IV of the United Kingdom.

Hunloke was appointed a Member (4th class) of the Royal Victorian Order (MVO) in 1916. promoted to Commander of the Order (CVO) in the 1921 New Year Honours, further promoted to Knight Commander of the Order (KCVO) in the 1928 Birthday Honours, and to Knight Grand Cross of the Order (GCVO) in 1936.
