= Stuart Brownlow Beatson =

UK soldier (1854–1914)

Sir Stuart Brownlow Beatson
- Born: 11 July 1854
- Died: 9 February 1914 (aged 59); Slaugham
- Military career
- Allegiance: United Kingdom
- Branch: British Army
- Rank: Major-general
- Conflicts: Jowaki Expedition; Third Anglo-Burmese War; Second Anglo-Afghan War; Anglo-Egyptian War; Siege of Malakand; Second Boer War
- Awards: KCB KCSI KCVO

Sir Stuart Brownlow Beatson KCB KCSI KCVO (1854–1914) was a soldier who served in India, Afghanistan and Africa across multiple campaigns and actions. When commanding a mobile column during the Second Boer War Beatson was involved in what became known as the Wilmansrust Incident after insulting the mentality of troops under his command. He later served as an Extra Equerry to the Prince of Wales and as a private secretary to Queen Mary during the 1911-12 tour of India.

== Early life ==
The son of Bengal Cavalry Captain William Stuart Beatson and Cornelia Brownlow, Beatson was born on 11 July 1854 and educated at Wellington College, Berkshire. Beatson was gazetted as a Sub-lieutenant in the 17th Foot on 9 October 1873.

== Early military service ==
After being gazetted as a second lieutenant Beatson progressed up the ranks quickly, and having been appointed to the Bengal Staff Corps as a lieutenant. After serving in the Jowaki Expedition, Beatson then took part in the Second Anglo-Afghan War with the 11th Bengal Lancers.

In 1882 he was appointed as an extra aide-de-camp to Sir Herbert Macpherson for the Anglo-Egyptian War. Returning to India, Beatson was appointed as military secretary to the Commander-in-Chief Madras in March 1886 and was mentioned in dispatches for his service in the Third Anglo-Burmese War where he was again mentioned in dispatches for his role in commanding the mounted infantry of the 11th Bengal Lancers in the Saigan district, by which time he had been promoted to major. He would also perform special duty in Syria for which he was awarded a medal and clasp.

Beatson was again mentioned in dispatches for reconnaissance work commanding the 11th Bengal Lancers at the Siege of Malakand.

== Second Boer War Service and the Wilmansrust Incident ==
Having again been mentioned in dispatches Beatson was appointed a Companion of the Order of the Bath in 1898 and promoted to lieutenant colonel. From 1900 Beatson was also appointed as Inspector-General of the Imperial Service Troops in India.

During the Second Boer War Beatson commanded a mobile column, which included the Australian 5th Victorian Mounted Rifles. Beatson split his force into two sections, with one of these, led by a Major Morris, engaged in a fierce confrontation which became known as the Wilmansrust Incident. Poor defensive measures led to the deaths of the regimental surgeon as well as 18 NCOs and men. Immediately following the incident, Beatson caused outrage in Australia after describing the 5th Victorian contingent as "a damned fat, round shouldered, useless crowd of wasters . . . In my opinion they are a lot of white-livered curs . . . You can add dogs too".

Shortly afterwards a trooper, James Steele, was overheard apparently refusing orders. Three men were arrested and sentenced to death for allegedly inciting mutiny. The convictions were commuted to penal servitude following appeal to Lord Kitchener with a subsequent appeal to Edward VII identifying that these lesser sentences had also not been carried out. Shortly afterwards Beatson was replaced by Theodore Stephenson but remained as Inspector-General of the Imperial Service Troops in India until 1907.

Despite the apparent controversy, Beatson was later appointed brevet colonel and major-general. He would then serve as an Extra Equerry to the Prince of Wales and, after being appointed K.C.B as a private secretary to Queen Mary during the 1911-12 tour of India.

== Polo ==
In 1889 Beatson was invited by Sir Pratap Singh to help raise a regiment of lancers , and was part of the Polo team which won the Rajputana Challenge Cup in 1893

== Family ==
Beatson married Edith Cecil, daughter of Lieutenant-general Sir William Kidston Elles in 1889, with the relationship resulting in a daughter who died young and a son, Major Charles Elles Stuart Beatson MC who died of wounds whilst serving with the 22nd Brigade Royal Field Artillery in the First World War.

== Death ==
Beatson died at the age of 59 at his home in Slaugham, Sussex.
