= List of knights and dames grand cross of the Royal Victorian Order appointed by Elizabeth II (2003–2022) =

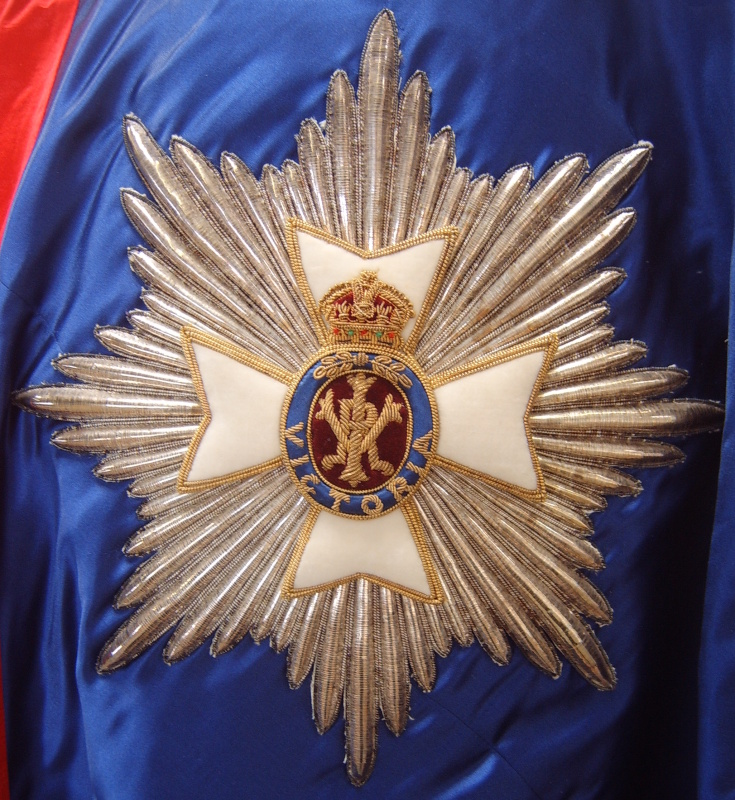
The star of a Knight or Dame Grand Cross of the Royal Victorian Order

The Royal Victorian Order is an order of knighthood awarded by the sovereign of the United Kingdom and several Commonwealth realms. It is granted personally by the monarch and recognises personal service to the monarchy, the Royal Household, royal family members, and the organisation of important royal events. The order was officially created and instituted on 23 April 1896 by letters patent under the Great Seal of the Realm by Queen Victoria. It was instituted with five grades, the two highest of which were Knight Grand Cross (GCVO) and Knight Commander (KCVO), which conferred the status of knighthood on holders (apart from foreigners, who typically received honorary awards not entitling them to the style of a knight). Women were not admitted until Edward VIII altered the statutes of the order in 1936; those receiving the highest two awards were styled dames and those grades, when conferred on women, are Dame Grand Cross and Dame Commander (DCVO).

No limit was placed on the number of appointments which could be made. Queen Elizabeth II appointed 23 Knights and 5 Dames Grand Cross between 2003 and her death on 8 September 2022.

== Knights and dames grand cross appointed by Elizabeth II ==
The list below is ordered by date of appointment. Full names, styles, ranks and titles are given where applicable, as correct at the time of appointment to the order. he details of the branch of service or regiment are given in parentheses to distinguish them from offices. Where applicable, the occasion is given that was listed either with the notices or in published material elsewhere, in which case that material is cited.

Name	Date	Notes	Ref.
Prince Michael of Kent KCVO	2 June 2003	On the occasion of the 50th anniversary of The Queen's coronation	
Sir John Eaton Holmes KBE CVO CMG	5 April 2004		
Sir Peter James Torry KCMG	2 November 2004		
Sir Walter Hugh Malcolm Ross KCVO OBE	7 December 2005	Comptroller of the Lord Chamberlain’s Office	
The Earl Peel	20 October 2006	Lord Chamberlain	
Sir Robin Berry Janvrin GCB KCVO	8 September 2007	Private Secretary to The Queen	
Donald Charles McKinnon ONZ	9 March 2009	Commonwealth Secretary-General	
The Countess of Wessex	20 January 2010	Royal Family	
Sir Hugh Ashley Roberts KCVO	20 April 2010	Director of the Royal Collection	
Sir Miles Garth Hunt-Davis KCVO CBE	14 December 2010	Private Secretary to The Duke of Edinburgh	
The Duke of York KG KCVO ADC	19 February 2011	On the occasion of his 51st birthday	
The Earl of Wessex KG KCVO ADC	10 March 2011	On the occasion of his 45th birthday	
Sir Michael Charles Gerrard Peat KCVO	17 October 2011	Principal Private Secretary to The Prince of Wales and The Duchess of Cornwall	
The Duchess of Cornwall	9 April 2012	On the occasion of her 7th wedding anniversary	
Sir Philip Alan Reid KCVO	13 September 2012	Keeper of the Privy Purse and Treasurer to The Queen	
The Hon. Dame Mary Anne Morrison DCVO	15 June 2013	Lady-in-Waiting to The Queen	
The Lady Hussey of North Bradley DCVO	15 June 2013	Lady-in-Waiting to The Queen	
Sir Peter Forbes Ricketts GCMG	7 June 2014		
Sir Christopher Edward Wollaston MacKenzie Geidt KCB KCVO OBE	5 October 2017	Private Secretary to The Queen	
The Duke of Edinburgh KG KT OM GBE PC ADC	20 November 2017	On the occasion of his 70th wedding anniversary	
Sir Stephen Mark Jeffrey Lamport KCVO	9 June 2018	Receiver-General, Westminster Abbey	
Lieutenant Colonel Sir Andrew Charles Ford KCVO	11 December 2018	Comptroller, Lord Chamberlain’s Office	
The Lord Vestey KCVO	12 December 2018	Master of the Horse	
The Duchess of Cambridge	29 April 2019	On the occasion of her 8th wedding anniversary	
Field Marshal The Lord Guthrie of Craigiebank GCB LVO OBE	14 June 2019	Gold Stick in Waiting to The Queen and Colonel of The Life Guards	
The Lord Chartres KCVO	18 July 2019	Dean of the Chapels Royal	
Sir William Richard Michael Oswald KCVO	28 December 2019	National Hunt Racing Adviser	
The Lord Parker of Minsmere KCB	14 April 2021	Lord Chamberlain	
The Duke of Norfolk	2 June 2022	Earl Marshal	

== See also ==
- List of knights and dames grand cross of the Royal Victorian Order appointed by Elizabeth II (1952–1977)
- List of knights and dames grand cross of the Royal Victorian Order appointed by Elizabeth II (1978–2002)
