= List of knights and dames grand cross of the Royal Victorian Order appointed by Charles III =

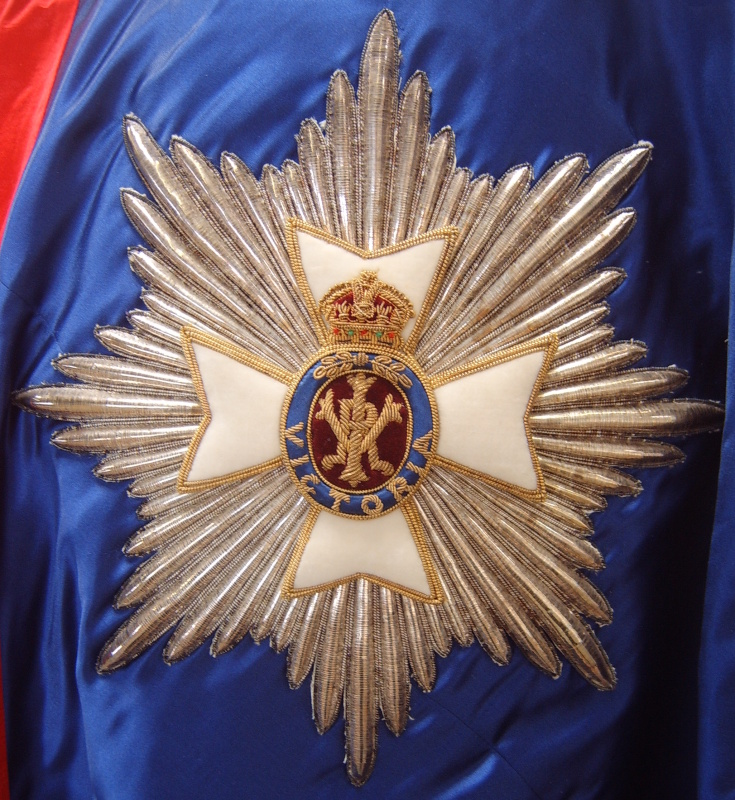
The star of a Knight or Dame Grand Cross of the Royal Victorian Order

The Royal Victorian Order is an order of knighthood awarded by the sovereign of the United Kingdom and several Commonwealth realms. It is granted personally by the monarch and recognises personal service to the monarchy, the Royal Household, royal family members, and the organisation of important royal events. The order was officially created and instituted on 23 April 1896 by letters patent under the Great Seal of the Realm by Queen Victoria. It was instituted with five grades, the two highest of which were Knight Grand Cross (GCVO) and Knight Commander (KCVO), which conferred the status of knighthood on holders (apart from foreigners, who typically received honorary awards not entitling them to the style of a knight). Women were not admitted until Edward VIII altered the statutes of the order in 1936; those receiving the highest two awards were styled dames and those grades, when conferred on women, are Dame Grand Cross (GCVO) and Dame Commander (DCVO).

No limit was placed on the number of appointments which could be made. King Charles III has appointed 10 Knights/Dames Grand Cross since his accession on 8 September 2022.

== Knights and dames grand cross appointed by Charles III ==
The list below is ordered by date of appointment. Full names, styles, ranks and titles are given where applicable, as correct at the time of appointment to the order. Branch of service or regiment details are given in parentheses to distinguish them from offices. Where applicable, the occasion is given that was listed either with the notices or in published material elsewhere, in which case that material is cited.

Name	Date	Notes	Ref.
The Marquess of Cholmondeley KCVO	25 March 2023	Lately Lord Great Chamberlain, on the death of Queen Elizabeth II	
The Earl of Dalhousie DL	25 March 2023	Lately Lord Steward of the Household, on the death of Queen Elizabeth	
Sir Edward Young KCVO	15 May 2023	Lately Joint Private Secretary to the Sovereign	
David John Conner KCVO	19 July 2023	Lately Dean of Windsor	
Justin Portal Welby	30 December 2023	Archbishop of Canterbury	
The Lord Benyon PC	4 November 2024	Lord Chamberlain of the Household	
Dame Annabel Whitehead DCVO	30 December 2024	Lady of the Household	
Sir Michael Stevens KCVO	3 June 2025	Keeper of the Privy Purse and Treasurer to the King	
Vice Admiral Sir Timothy Laurence KCVO CB CSM ADC FSA	21 August 2025	Royal Family	
The Duke of Buccleuch and Queensberry KT KBE CVO FSA FRSE FRSGS	30 December 2025	Chancellor of the Order of the Thistle and lately Lord Lieutenant of Roxburgh, Ettrick and Lauderdale	
