= List of knights and dames commander of the Royal Victorian Order appointed by Charles III =

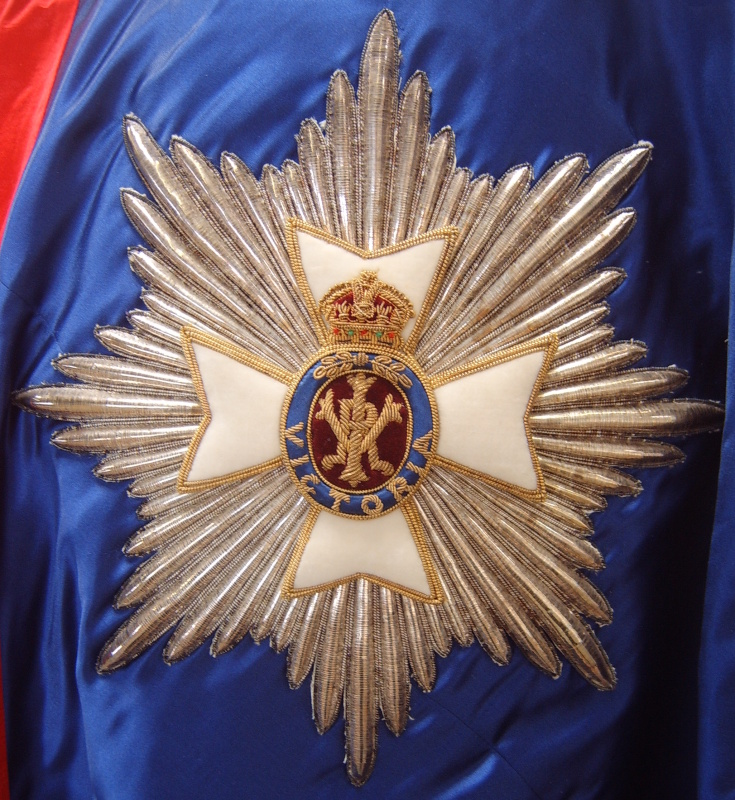
The star of a knight or dame grand cross of the Royal Victorian Order

The Royal Victorian Order is an order of knighthood awarded by the sovereign of the United Kingdom and several Commonwealth realms. It is granted personally by the monarch and recognises personal service to the monarchy, the Royal Household, royal family members, and the organisation of important royal events. The order was officially created and instituted on 23 April 1896 by Letters Patent under the Great Seal of the Realm by Queen Victoria. It was instituted with five grades, the two highest of which were Knight Grand Cross (GCVO) and Knight Commander (KCVO), which conferred the status of knighthood on holders (apart from foreigners, who typically received honorary awards not entitling them to the style of a knight). Women were not admitted until Edward VIII altered the statutes of the order in 1936; those receiving the highest two awards were styled dames and those grades, when conferred on women, are Dame Grand Cross and Dame Commander (DCVO).

No limit was placed on the number of appointments which could be made. King Charles III has appointed 13 Knights Commander and 7 Dames Commander since his accession in 2022.

== Knights and dames commander appointed by Charles III ==
The list below is ordered by date of appointment. Full names, ranks and titles are given where applicable, as correct at the time of appointment to the order. Branch of service or regiment details are given in parentheses to distinguish them from offices. The offices listed are those given in the official notice, printed in the London Gazette. Where applicable, the occasion is given that was listed either with the notices or in published material elsewhere, in which case that material is cited.

Name	Date	Notes	List	Reference
Sir Nicholas Hickman Ponsonby Bacon Bt OBE DL	31 December 2022	Lately Lord Warden of the Stannaries and Member of The Prince's Council, Duchy of Cornwall	2023 New Year Honours	
Jonathan Crow KC	31 December 2022	Barrister; lately Attorney General to HRH The Prince of Wales between 2006 - 2020.	2023 New Year Honours	
Helen Andrea Louise Cross CVO	25 March 2023	Lately Diary Secretary to Her Majesty Queen Elizabeth II	2023 Demise Honours	
Philippa de Pass CVO	25 March 2023	Lately Lady in Waiting to Her Majesty Queen Elizabeth II	2023 Demise Honours	
Jennifer Susan Gordon Lennox CVO	25 March 2023	Lately Lady in Waiting to Her Majesty Queen Elizabeth II	2023 Demise Honours	
The Very Reverend Dr David John Ison	30 May 2023	Upon relinquishing his appointment as Dean of St Paul's	2023 Special Honours	
Major General Christopher John Ghika CBE	28 June 2023	Upon relinquishing his appointment as Major-General Commanding the Household Division	2023 Special Honours	
The Right Reverend James William Scobie Newcome DL	15 November 2023	Upon relinquishing his appointment as Clerk of the Closet	2023 Special Honours	
Lieutenant Colonel Anthony Charles Richards CVO	28 November 2023	Lately Deputy Master of the Household and Equerry to Her Majesty Queen Elizabeth II	2023 Special Honours	
Rowena Jane Feilden CVO	30 December 2023	Lady in Waiting to The Princess Royal	2024 New Year Honours	
Colonel Edward Thomas Bolitho OBE	30 December 2023	Lord-Lieutenant of Cornwall	2024 New Year Honours	
The Very Reverend Dr David Michael Hoyle MBE	30 December 2023	Dean of Westminster Abbey, on the occasion of the Coronation of Their Majesties The King and Queen	2024 New Year Honours	
Her Grace Isobel Jane Miller, Duchess of Northumberland	15 June 2024	Lord Lieutenant of Northumberland	2024 Birthday Honours	
Lieutenant Colonel The Right Honourable Rupert Charles, 7th Baron de Mauley TD	15 June 2024	Master of the Horse	2024 Birthday Honours	
Captain Ian McNaught CVO	15 June 2024	Deputy Master, the Corporation of Trinity House	2024 Birthday Honours	
The Right Reverend Dr John Geoffrey Inge	13 November 2024	Upon relinquishing his appointment as Lord High Almoner	2024 Special Honours	
Sarah Rose Troughton	30 December 2024	Lord-Lieutenant of Wiltshire; One of the Queen's companions to Queen Camilla.	2025 New Year Honours	
Ian James Dudson CBE	30 December 2024	Lord-Lieutenant of Staffordshire	2025 New Year Honours	
Nathan James Thompson CVO	30 December 2024	Lately Clerk of the Council and Chief Executive, Duchy of Lancaster	2025 New Year Honours	
Robert Lowry Scott OBE	14 June 2025	Lord Lieutenant of Tyrone	2025 Birthday Honours	
Susan Snowdon	14 June 2025	Lord Lieutenant of Durham	2025 Birthday Honours	
Lieutenant Colonel Michael Vernon	1 July 2025	Upon relinquishing his appointment as Comptroller, Lord Chamberlain's Office	2025 Special Honours	
Celia Jane Innes CVO	30 December 2025	Senior Lady-in-Waiting to The Princess Royal	2026 New Year Honours	
Charlotte Elizabeth Manley CVO OBE	30 December 2025	Lately Chapter Clerk, College of St George, Windsor Castle	2026 New Year Honours	
Elizabeth Aline Clare Hunka CVO	13 June 2026	Director of Human Resources, Royal Household	2026 Birthday Honours	
Leona Mary Anson, Countess of Lichfield CVO	13 June 2026	Lady-in-Waiting to The Princess of Wales	2026 Birthday Honours	
Dr Michael David Dixon CVO OBE	13 June 2026	Head of the Royal Medical Household	2026 Birthday Honours	
David Vines White	13 June 2026	Garter Principal King of Arms	2026 Birthday Honours	
