= Royal Victorian Order =

British order of chivalry established in 1896

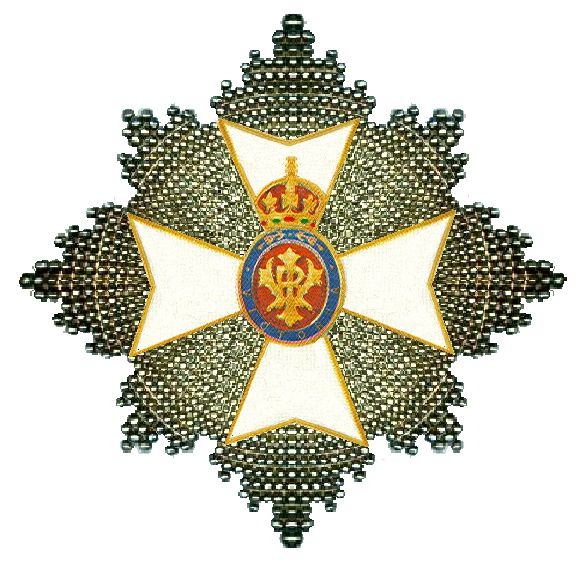
- Breast star of Knights/Dames Grand Cross

Awarded by Charles III
- Type: Dynastic order
- Established: 21 April 1896
- Motto: Victoria
- Awarded for: Personal service to the Sovereign
- Status: Currently constituted
- Founder: Victoria
- Sovereign: Charles III
- Grand Master: Anne, Princess Royal
- Chancellor: The Lord Benyon
- Grades: Knight/Dame Grand Cross (GCVO); Knight/Dame Commander (KCVO/DCVO); Commander (CVO); Lieutenant (LVO); Member (MVO)

Statistics
- First induction: 1896

Precedence
- Next (higher): Dependent on state
- Next (lower): Dependent on state
- Ribbon of an ordinary member of the order Ribbon of an honorary member of the order

The Royal Victorian Order (French: Ordre royal de Victoria) (Note: For use in Canada, in accordance with the country's policy of official bilingualism.) is a dynastic order of knighthood established in 1896 by Queen Victoria. It recognises distinguished personal service to the monarch, members of the royal family, or to any viceroy or senior representative of the monarch. The present monarch, King Charles III, is the sovereign of the order. The order's motto is Victoria. The order's official day is 20 June. (Note: 20 June 1837 was Victoria's Accession Day.) The order's chapel is the Savoy Chapel in London.

There is no limit on the number of individuals honoured at any grade. Admission is at the sole discretion of the monarch. Each of the order's five grades represent different levels of service, as does the medal, which has three levels of service. While all those honoured may use the prescribed styles of the order – the top two grades grant titles of knighthood, and all grades accord distinct post-nominal letters – the Royal Victorian Order's precedence amongst other honours differs from realm to realm and admission to some grades may be barred to citizens of those realms by government policy.

Appointments to the order are announced in The Gazette.

== History ==
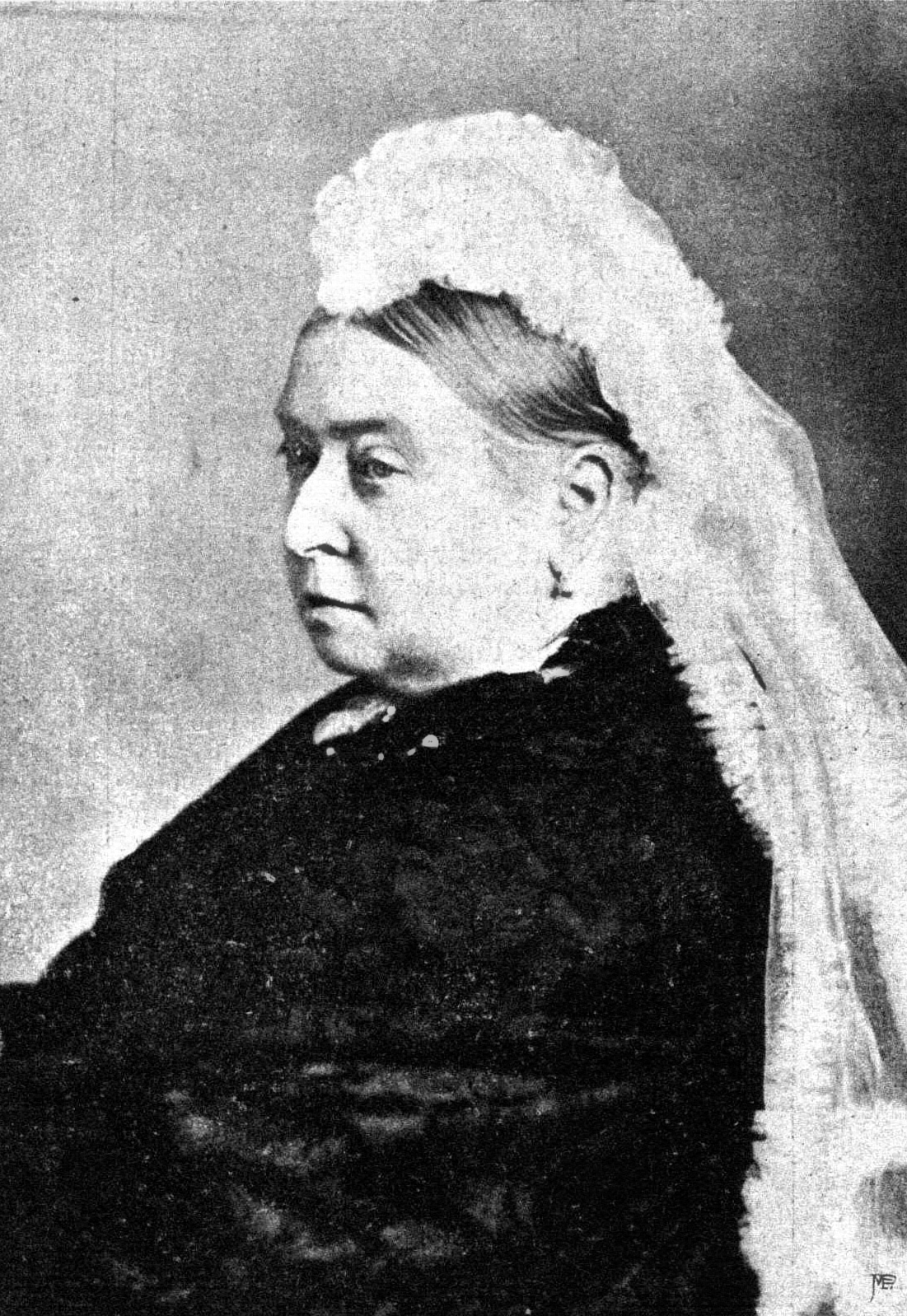
Queen Victoria in 1897, the year after she founded the Royal Victorian Order

Prior to the close of the 19th century, most general honours within the British Empire were bestowed by the sovereign on the advice of her British ministers, who sometimes forwarded advice from ministers of the Crown in the Dominions and colonies (appointments to the then most senior orders of chivalry, the Order of the Garter and the Order of the Thistle, had been made on ministerial advice since the 18th century and were not restored to the personal gift of the sovereign until 1946 and 1947, respectively). Queen Victoria thus established on 21 April 1896 the Royal Victorian Order as a junior and personal order of knighthood that allowed her to bestow directly to an empire-wide community honours for personal services. The organisation was founded a year before Victoria's Diamond Jubilee, so as to give the Queen time to complete a list of first inductees. The order's official day was made 20 June of each year, marking the anniversary of Queen Victoria's accession to the throne.

In 1902, King Edward VII created the Royal Victorian Chain "as a personal decoration for royal personages and a few eminent British subjects" and it was the highest class of the Royal Victorian Order. It is today distinct from the order, though it is officially issued by the chancery of the Royal Victorian Order.

The order was open to foreigners from its inception, with the Prefect of Alpes-Maritimes and the Mayor of Nice being the first foreigners to receive the honour in 1896. Commanders of the order had precedence immediately after knights bachelor and ahead of the companions of all the senior orders until 1917, when they were treated like the companions of senior orders and ranked after companions of the Order of the Indian Empire. The order was opened to women by King Edward VIII in 1936.

== Composition ==
The reigning monarch is at the apex of the Royal Victorian Order as its Sovereign, followed by the Grand Master; the latter position was created in 1937 and was occupied by Queen Elizabeth (later the Queen Mother) from that date until her death in 2002. Queen Elizabeth II then appointed her daughter, Anne, Princess Royal, to the position in 2007. Below the Grand Master are five officials of the organisation: the Chancellor, held by the Lord Chamberlain; the Secretary, held by the Keeper of the Privy Purse and Treasurer to the King; the Registrar, held by the Secretary to the Central Chancery of the Orders of Knighthood; the Chaplain, held by the Chaplain of the King's Chapel of the Savoy; and the Genealogist.

Thereafter follow those honoured with different grades of the order, divided into five levels: the highest two conferring accolades of knighthood and all having post-nominal letters and, lastly, the holders of the Royal Victorian Medal in gold, silver or bronze. Foreigners may be admitted as honorary members. There are no limits to the number of any grade, and promotion is possible. The styles of knighthood are not used by princes, princesses, or peers in the uppermost ranks of the society, save for when their names are written in their fullest forms for the most official occasions. Retiring Deans of the Royal Peculiars of St. George's Chapel, Windsor Castle and Westminster Abbey are customarily inducted as Knights Commander; clergymen appointed to the higher levels of the Royal Victorian Order do not use the associated styles, however, and honorary members are not permitted to hold them at all.

Prior to 1984, the grades of Lieutenant and Member were classified as Members (fourth class) and Members (fifth class), respectively, but both with the post-nominals MVO. On 31 December of that year, Queen Elizabeth II declared that those in the grade of Member (fourth class) would henceforth be Lieutenants with the post-nominals LVO.

Grades of the Royal Victorian Order
Grade	Knight Grand Cross	Dame Grand Cross	Knight Commander	Dame Commander	Commander	Lieutenant	Member	Royal Victorian Medal (Note: The Royal Victorian Medal does not make a person a member of the Order, but it is associated with the Order.)
Prefix	Sir	Dame	Sir	Dame	—	—	—	—
Post-nominals	GCVO		KCVO	DCVO	CVO	LVO	MVO	RVM
Insignia								

== Insignia and vestments ==
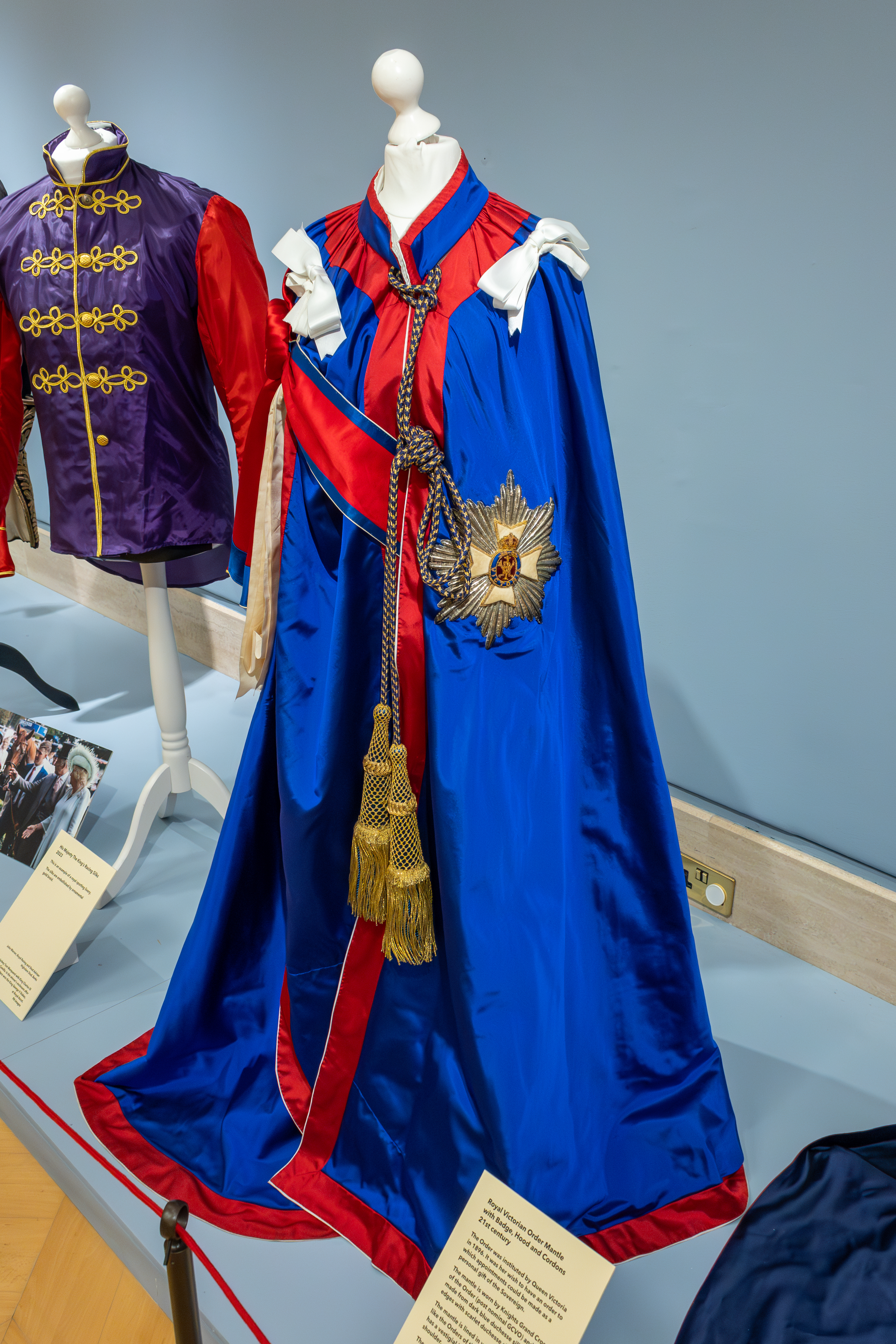
Mantle of the order bearing the star of a Knight Grand Cross

Upon admission into the Royal Victorian Order, members are given various insignia. Common for all members is the badge, which is a Maltese cross with a central medallion depicting on a red background the Royal Cypher of Queen Victoria surrounded by a blue ring bearing the motto of the order – victoria (victory) – and surmounted by a Tudor crown. However, there are variations on the badge for each grade of the order: Knights and Dames Grand Cross on certain formal occasions (see below) wear the badge suspended from the Order's collar (chain), but otherwise on a sash passing from the right shoulder to the left hip; Knights Commander and male Commanders wear the badge on a ribbon at the neck; male Lieutenants and Members wear the badge from a ribbon on the left chest; and women in all grades below Dame Grand Cross wear the badge on a bow pinned at the left shoulder. For Knights and Dames Grand Cross, Commanders, and Lieutenants, the Maltese cross is rendered in white enamel with gold edging, while that for Knights and Dames Commander (on the star) and Members (the badge itself) is in silver. Further, the size of the badge varies by rank, that for the higher classes being larger, and Knights and Dames Grand Cross and Knights and Dames Commander have their crosses surrounded by a star: for the former, an eight-pointed silver star, and for the latter, an eight-pointed silver Maltese cross with silver rays between each arm.

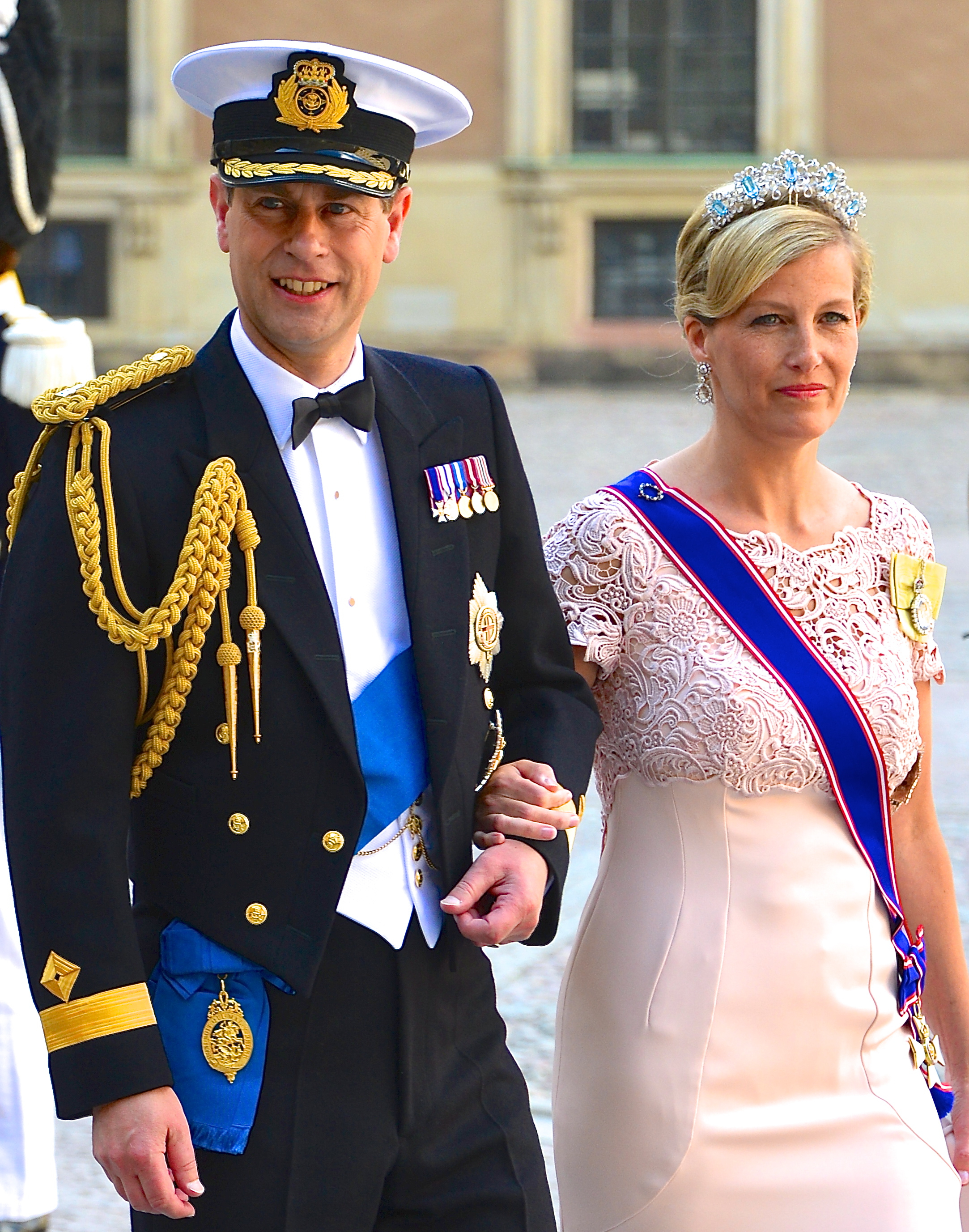
Sophie, Duchess of Edinburgh (in 2013, as the Countess of Wessex) wearing the riband of a Dame Grand Cross of the Order

The medal bears the effigy and name of the reigning sovereign at the time of its issue, as well as the phrase DEI • GRATIA • REX (or REGINA) • F.D. (by the grace of God, King (or Queen), Defender of the Faith), and on the reverse is the Royal Cypher upon an ornamental shield within a laurel wreath. Bars may be added to each class of medal for further services, and should recipients receive a higher level of medal or be appointed to a grade of the order itself, they may continue to wear their original medal along with the new insignia.

The order's ribbon is blue with red-white-red stripe edging, the only difference being that for foreigners appointed into the society, their ribbon bears an additional central white stripe. For Knights Grand Cross, the ribbon is 82.5 millimetres (3.25 in) wide, for Dames Grand Cross 57.1 millimetres (2.25 in), for Knights and Dames Commander 44.4 millimetres (1.75 in), and for all other members 31.7 millimetres (1.25 in).

At formal events, or collar days, of which there are 34 throughout the year, such as New Year's Day and royal anniversaries, Knights and Dames Grand Cross wear the Royal Victorian Order's livery collar, consisting of an alternating string of octagonal gold pieces depicting a gold rose on a blue field and gold oblong frames within which are one of four inscriptions: Victoria, Britt. Reg. (Queen of the Britains), Def. Fid. (fidei defensor, or Defender of the Faith), and Ind. Imp. (Empress of India). The chain supports a larger octagonal medallion with a blue enamel surface edged in red and charged with a saltire, over which is an effigy of Queen Victoria; members of the order suspend from this medallion their insignia as a badge apendant. Though after the death of a Knight or Dame Grand Cross their insignia may be retained by their family, the collar must be returned. Knights and Dames Grand Cross also wear a mantle of dark blue satin edged with red satin and lined with white satin, bearing a representation of the order's star on the left side.

== Chapel ==
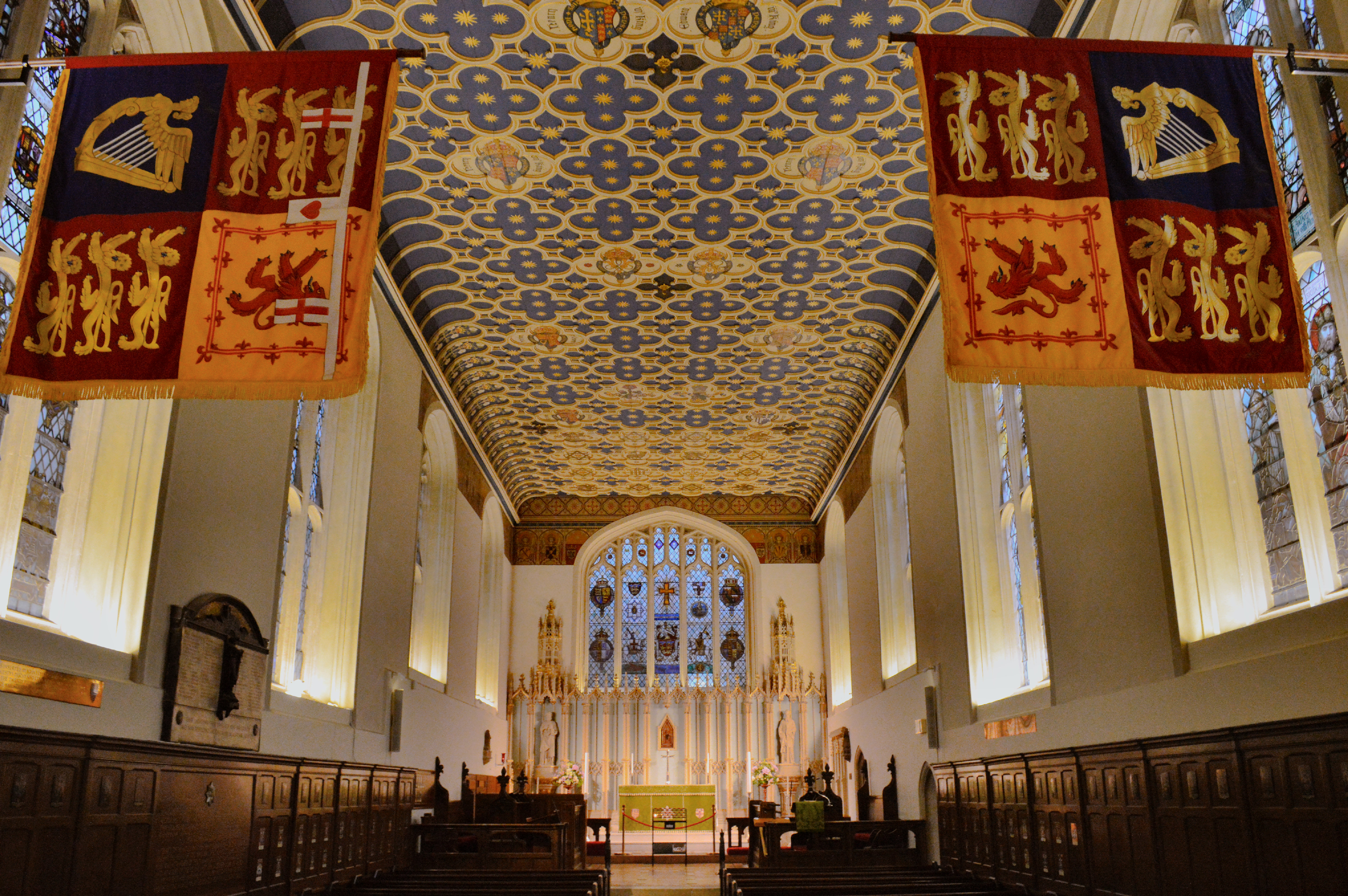
The King's Chapel of the Savoy, which acts as the chapel of the Royal Victorian Order (photographed in 2020). The banners are those of the Sovereign (right) and of the Grand Master (left) of the Order as they were then in office.

Since 1938, the chapel of the Royal Victorian Order has been the King's Chapel of the Savoy, in central London, England. However, the population of the order has grown to the point that the Savoy chapel can no longer accommodate the gathering of members held every four years, and St. George's Chapel, Windsor Castle is now employed for the event.

The Sovereign and Knights and Dames Grand Cross of the order are allotted stalls in the Savoy chapel's choir, and on the back of each stall is affixed a brass plate displaying the occupant's name, coat of arms, and date of admission into the organisation. Upon the occupant's death, the plate is retained, leaving the stalls festooned with a record of the order's Knights and Dames Grand Cross since 1938. The only heraldic banners normally on display in the chapel are those of the Sovereign of the Royal Victorian Order and of the Grand Master of the Royal Victorian Order as there is insufficient space in the chapel for more knights' and dames' banners or other heraldic devices.

The Chaplain of the King's Chapel of the Savoy is ex officio the Chaplain to the Royal Victorian Order. The incumbent is Canon Thomas Woodhouse.

== Eligibility and appointment ==
Coat of arms of Lord Baden-Powell, showing the circlet of the Royal Victorian Order around the escutcheon and the order's insignia suspended underneath

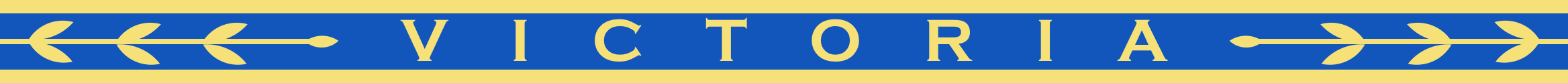
The Royal Victorian Order's heraldic circlet, as viewed when laid out flat

Membership in the Royal Victorian Order is conferred by the monarch without ministerial advice on those who have performed personal service for the sovereign.

Foreign members will generally be admitted as honorary members of the Royal Victorian Order when the sovereign is making a state visit to the individual's country or a head of state is paying a state visit to the United Kingdom.

=== Canadians ===
As admission to the top two levels of the organisation provides for an honorary prefix, Canadians are not normally appointed to these levels as long as the monarch's Canadian ministry adheres to the Nickle Resolution of 1919.

As it was deemed by the Canadian Cabinet to be an honour within the gift of the monarch, the appointment of Canadians to the order resumed in 1972 and eligibility was extended to those who render services to the monarch's representatives in the country; officials within the provincial spheres being included after 1984. Originally, the sovereign chose inductees personally, though the Governor General of Canada and the Canadian Secretary to the King could provide suggestions, some passed to them by the lieutenant governors. The practice of notifying the Prime Minister of Canada of nominees ended in 1982, to distance the order as far from politics as possible.

It was reported in 2008 that some in the Chancellery of Honours at Rideau Hall wished to eliminate the Royal Victorian Order from the Canadian honours system and sometimes contested when a Canadian was appointed; however, no formal changes were ever planned. In Canada, the order has come to be colloquially dubbed as the "Royal Visit Order", as the majority of appointments had been made by the then sovereign during her tours of the country.

==== Association ====
The Royal Victorian Order Association of Canada exists for all Canadians appointed to the order or who have received the Royal Victorian Medal; it is the only such organisation in the Commonwealth realms. Founded by D. Michael Jackson (1940–2022), the group has, since 2008, gathered biennially.

=== Australians ===
As with Canada, the order remains open to Australians, as it is considered a personal gift of the sovereign, and appointments have continued beyond the end of Australia's use of the wider imperial honours system in 1994. The highest grades of GCVO and KCVO/DCVO have been bestowed sparingly and, although nominally still open to Australians, have not been bestowed since 1990, when Sir William Heseltine was made GCVO and Sir David Smith was made KCVO; Governors-General are now typically appointed CVO, when prior to the 1990s, the higher grades would have been conferred, such as the GCVO to governors-general Sir Zelman Cowen (1980) and Sir Ninian Stephen (1982), and the KCVO to governors of states on the occasion of a visit by then Queen. Appointments are generally made following a royal visit to Australia, to vice-regal representatives at the Commonwealth, state and territory level, or more generally in "acknowledgment of exceptional service to Vice Regal representatives" (such as to the staff assisting royal visits, or of the various viceregal offices and households).

== Precedence ==
As the Royal Victorian Order is open to the citizens of fifteen countries, each with its own system of orders, decorations, and medals, the RVO's place of precedence varies from country to country. Some are as follows:

Country		Preceding	RVO grade	Following
(Australia) Australia; Order of precedence (Note: The order is different for honours received prior to 6 October 1992.)		Knight/Dame of the Order of Australia (AK/AD)	Knight/Dame Grand Cross	Companion of the Order of Australia (AC)
(Australia) Australia; Order of precedence		Companion of the Order of Australia (AC)	Knight/Dame Commander	Officer of the Order of Australia (AO)
(Australia) Australia; Order of precedence		Officer of the Order of Australia (AO)	Commander	Star of Gallantry (SG)
(Australia) Australia; Order of precedence		Member of the Order of Australia (AM)	Lieutenant	Member of the Royal Victorian Order (MVO)
(Australia) Australia; Order of precedence		Lieutenant of the Royal Victorian Order (LVO)	Member	Conspicuous Service Cross (CSC)
(Australia) Australia; Order of precedence		Australian Antarctic Medal (AAM)	Medal	Commendation for Gallantry
(Canada) Canada; Order of precedence (Note: The order is different for honours received prior to 1 June 1972.)		Commander of the Order of Merit of the Police Forces (COM)	Commander	Officer of the Order of Military Merit (OMM)
(Canada) Canada; Order of precedence		Officer of the Order of Merit of the Police Forces (OOM)	Lieutenant	Member of the Order of Military Merit (MMM)
(Canada) Canada; Order of precedence		Member of the Order of Merit of the Police Forces (MOM)	Member	Venerable Order of Saint John (GC/K/D/C/O/M/SB/SSStJ)
(Canada) Canada; Order of precedence		Meritorious Service Medal (MSM)	Medal	Sacrifice Medal
(New Zealand) New Zealand; Order of precedence		Knight/Dame Grand Cross of the Order of St Michael and St George (GCMG)	Knight/Dame Grand Cross	Knight/Dame Grand Cross of the Order of the British Empire (GBE)
(New Zealand) New Zealand; Order of precedence		Knight/Dame Commander of the Order of St Michael and St George (KCMG/DCMG)	Knight/Dame Commander	Knight/Dame Commander of the Order of the British Empire (KBE/DBE)
(New Zealand) New Zealand; Order of precedence		Companion of the Order of St Michael and St George (CMG)	Commander	Commander of the Order of the British Empire (CBE)
(New Zealand) New Zealand; Order of precedence		Companion of the Distinguished Service Order (DSO)	Lieutenant	Companion of the Queen's Service Order (QSO)
(New Zealand) New Zealand; Order of precedence		Companion of the Imperial Service Order (ISO)	Member	Member of the New Zealand Order of Merit (MNZM)
(New Zealand) New Zealand; Order of precedence		New Zealand Bravery Medal (NZBM)	Medal	Queen's Service Medal (QSM)
United Kingdom	England and Wales; Order of precedence	Knight/Dame Grand Commander of the Order of the Indian Empire (GCIE)	Knight/Dame Grand Cross	Knight/Dame Grand Cross of the Order of the British Empire (GBE)
United Kingdom	England and Wales; Order of precedence	Knight/Dame Commander of the Order of the Indian Empire (KCIE/DCIE)	Knight/Dame Commander	Knight/Dame Commander of the Order of the British Empire (KBE/DBE)
United Kingdom	England and Wales; Order of precedence	Companion of the Order of the Indian Empire (CIE)	Commander	Commander of the Order of the British Empire (CBE)
United Kingdom	England and Wales; Order of precedence	Companion of the Distinguished Service Order (DSO)	Lieutenant	Officer of the Order of the British Empire (OBE)
United Kingdom	England and Wales; Order of precedence	Eldest son of Knight Bachelor	Member	Member of the Order of the British Empire (MBE)
United Kingdom	(Scotland) Scotland; Order of precedence	Knight/Dame Grand Commander of the Order of the Indian Empire (GCIE)	Knight/Dame Grand Cross	Knight/Dame Grand Cross of the Order of the British Empire (GBE)
United Kingdom	(Scotland) Scotland; Order of precedence	Knight/Dame Commander of the Order of the Indian Empire (KCIE/DCIE)	Knight/Dame Commander	Knight/Dame Commander of the Order of the British Empire (KBE/DBE)
United Kingdom	(Scotland) Scotland; Order of precedence	Sheriffs	Commander	Companion of the Order of the Bath (CB)
United Kingdom	(Scotland) Scotland; Order of precedence	Commander of the Order of the British Empire (CBE)	Lieutenant	Companion of the Distinguished Service Order (DSO)
United Kingdom	(Scotland) Scotland; Order of precedence	Eldest son of Knight Commander of the Order of the British Empire	Member	Member of the Order of the British Empire (MBE)
United Kingdom	Northern Ireland; Order of precedence	Knight/Dame Grand Commander of the Order of the Indian Empire (GCIE)	Knight/Dame Grand Cross	Knight/Dame Grand Cross of the Order of the British Empire (GBE)
United Kingdom	Northern Ireland; Order of precedence	Knight/Dame Commander of the Order of the Indian Empire (KCIE/DCIE)	Knight/Dame Commander	Knight/Dame Commander of the Order of the British Empire (KBE/DBE)
United Kingdom	Northern Ireland; Order of precedence	Companion of the Order of the Indian Empire (CIE)	Commander	Commander of the Order of the British Empire (CBE)
United Kingdom	Northern Ireland; Order of precedence	Companion of the Distinguished Service Order (DSO)	Lieutenant	Officer of the Order of the British Empire (OBE)
United Kingdom	Northern Ireland; Order of precedence	Eldest son of Knight Commander of the Order of the British Empire	Member	Member of the Order of the British Empire (MBE)
_{ }

In the United Kingdom, the wives of male members of all classes also feature on the order of precedence, as do sons, daughters and daughters-in-law of Knights Grand Cross and Knights Commander; relatives of Dames, however, are not assigned any special precedence. As a general rule, individuals can derive precedence from their fathers or husbands, but not from their mothers or wives.

== Current Knights and Dames Grand Cross ==
=== Sovereign and Grand Master ===
Name	Year of appointment	Present age
Charles III (ex officio)	Sovereign since 2022	77
Anne, Princess Royal	1974 as Dame Grand Cross; Grand Master since 2007	76

=== Knights and Dames Grand Cross ===
Name	Known for	Year of appointment	Present age
Prince Edward, Duke of Kent	Royal Family	1960	91
Princess Alexandra, The Honourable Lady Ogilvy	Royal Family	1960	89
Prince Richard, Duke of Gloucester	Royal Family	1974	82
Birgitte, Duchess of Gloucester	Royal Family	1989	80
Sir Brian Fall	Ambassador to Russia and High Commissioner to Canada	1994	88
Major General Sir Simon Cooper	Master of the Household	2000	89–90
Richard Luce, Baron Luce	Lord Chamberlain and Governor of Gibraltar	2000	90
Vice Admiral Jeffrey Sterling, Baron Sterling of Plaistow	Chairman of the Golden Jubilee Weekend Trust	2002	91
Prince Michael of Kent	Royal Family	2003	84
Sir John Holmes	Ambassador to France	2004	75
Sir Peter Torry	Ambassador to Germany and Ambassador to Spain	2004	78
William Peel, 3rd Earl Peel	Lord Chamberlain	2006	79
Robin Janvrin, Baron Janvrin	Private Secretary to the Sovereign	2007	80
Sir Donald McKinnon	Secretary-General of the Commonwealth of Nations	2009	87
Sophie, Duchess of Edinburgh	Royal Family	2010	61
Sir Hugh Roberts	Surveyor of the Queen's Works of Art	2010	78
Prince Edward, Duke of Edinburgh	Royal Family	2011	62
Sir Michael Peat	Principal Private Secretary to the Prince of Wales	2011	76
Sir Alan Reid	Keeper of the Privy Purse	2012	79
Queen Camilla	Royal Family	2012	79
Susan Hussey, Baroness Hussey of North Bradley	Woman of the Bedchamber	2013	87
Dame Mary Morrison	Woman of the Bedchamber	2013	87
Peter Ricketts, Baron Ricketts	National Security Adviser and Permanent Under-Secretary of State of the Foreign and Commonwealth Office	2014	74
Christopher Geidt, Baron Geidt	Private Secretary to the Sovereign	2017	65
Sir Stephen Lamport	Receiver-General of Westminster Abbey	2018	74
Lieutenant Colonel Sir Andrew Ford	Comptroller, Lord Chamberlain's Office	2018	69
Catherine, Princess of Wales	Royal Family	2019	44
Richard Chartres, Baron Chartres	Bishop of London, Dean of the Chapel Royal	2019	79
Andrew Parker, Baron Parker of Minsmere	Lord Chamberlain	2021	64
Edward Fitzalan-Howard, 18th Duke of Norfolk	Earl Marshal	2022	69
David Cholmondeley, 7th Marquess of Cholmondeley	Lord Great Chamberlain	2023	66
James Ramsay, 17th Earl of Dalhousie	Lord Steward	2023	78
Edward Young, Baron Young of Old Windsor	Private Secretary to the Sovereign	2023	60
David Conner	Dean of Windsor	2023	79
Justin Welby	Archbishop of Canterbury	2024	70
Richard Benyon, Baron Benyon	Lord Chamberlain	2024	66
Dame Annabel Whitehead	Woman of the Bedchamber	2025	83
Sir Michael Stevens	Keeper of the Privy Purse and Treasurer to HM The King	2025	68
Vice Admiral Sir Timothy Laurence	Royal Family	2025	71
Richard Scott, 10th Duke of Buccleuch	Chancellor of the Order of the Thistle, Lord Lieutenant of Roxburgh, Ettrick and Lauderdale, and Captain General of the Royal Company of Archers	2026	72

=== Honorary Knights and Dames Grand Cross ===
Country	Name	Known for	Year of appointment	Present age	Notes
Japan	Emperor Akihito of Japan	Emperor of Japan	1953 as Crown Prince; Emperor from 1989; abdicated 2019	92	On the occasion of attending the Coronation of Elizabeth II
Netherlands	Princess Beatrix of the Netherlands	Queen of the Netherlands	1958 as Princess Beatrix; Queen from 1980; abdicated 2013	88	Recipient of the Royal Victorian Chain; on the occasion of the state visit by Elizabeth II to the Netherlands
Ethiopian Empire	Prince Mengesha Seyoum	Prince of Ethiopia	1965	98	On the occasion of the state visit by Elizabeth II to Ethiopia
Belgium	King Albert II of Belgium	King of the Belgians	1966 as Prince of Liège; King from 1993; abdicated 2013	92	On the occasion of the state visit by Elizabeth II to Belgium
Luxembourg	Grand Duke Henri of Luxembourg	Grand Duke of Luxembourg	1976 as Hereditary Grand Duke; Grand Duke from 2000; abdicated 2025	71	On the occasion of the state visit by Elizabeth II to Luxembourg
Morocco	King Mohammed VI of Morocco	King of Morocco	1980 as Crown Prince; King since 1999	63	On the occasion of the state visit by Elizabeth II to Morocco
Morocco	Princess Lalla Meryem of Morocco	Princess of Morocco	1980	64	On the occasion of the state visit by Elizabeth II to Morocco
Malawi	Cecilia Kadzamira	Official Hostess of Malawi	1985	88	On the occasion of the state visit by Hastings Banda to the United Kingdom
Morocco	Princess Lalla Asma of Morocco	Princess of Morocco	1987	61	On the occasion of the state visit by Hassan II to the United Kingdom
Morocco	Prince Moulay Rachid of Morocco	Prince of Morocco	1987	56	On the occasion of the state visit by Hassan II to the United Kingdom
Spain	King Felipe VI of Spain	King of Spain	1988 as Prince of Asturias; King since 2014	58	On the occasion of the state visit by Elizabeth II to Spain
Kuwait	Khaled Al-Duwaisan	Kuwaiti diplomat	1995	79	On the occasion of the state visit by Jaber Al-Ahmad Al-Sabah to the United Kingdom
Thailand	King Vajiralongkorn of Thailand	King of Thailand	1996 as Crown Prince; King since 2016	74	On the occasion of the state visit by Elizabeth II to Thailand
Thailand	Princess Sirindhorn, Princess Royal of Thailand	Princess Royal of Thailand	1996	71	On the occasion of the state visit by Elizabeth II to Thailand
Thailand	Princess Chulabhorn of Thailand	Princess of Thailand	1996	69	On the occasion of the state visit by Elizabeth II to Thailand
Brunei	Prince Al-Muhtadee Billah, Crown Prince of Brunei	Crown Prince of Brunei	1998	52	On the occasion of the Commonwealth visit by Elizabeth II to Brunei
Nigeria	Emeka Anyaoku	Secretary-General of the Commonwealth of Nations	2000	93	On the occasion of the end of his tenure
Oman	Sultan Haitham bin Tariq of Oman	Sultan of Oman	2010 as Sayyid Haitham bin Tariq bin Taimur Al Said; Sultan since 2020	71	On the occasion of the state visit by Elizabeth II to Oman
India	Kamalesh Sharma	Secretary-General of the Commonwealth of Nations	2016	85	On the occasion of the end of his tenure
Jordan	King Abdullah II of Jordan	King of Jordan	2024	64	On the occasion of his silver jubilee
Bahrain	King Hamad bin Isa of Bahrain	King of Bahrain	2024	76	On the occasion of his silver jubilee

=== Honorary Knights and Dames Commander ===
Country	Name	Known for	Year of appointment	Present age	Notes
Indonesia	Teuku Mohammad Hamzah Thayeb KCVO	Ambassador to the United Kingdom	2012	74	
South Korea	Lim Sung-nam KCVO	Ambassador to the United Kingdom	2013		
Singapore	Foo Chi Hsia DCVO	High Commissioner to the United Kingdom	2013		
France	Bernard Émié KCVO	Ambassador to the United Kingdom	2014	68	
Mexico	Diego Gómez Pickering KCVO	Ambassador to the United Kingdom	2015	49	

=== Officers ===
- Chaplain: The Reverend Canon Thomas Woodhouse, as Chaplain of the King's Chapel of the Savoy, since 2019
- Chancellor: Richard Benyon, Baron Benyon GCVO, PC, as Lord Chamberlain, since November 2024
- Secretary: James Chalmers, as Keeper of the Privy Purse, since July 2025
- Registrar: Lieutenant Colonel Stephen Segrave, as Secretary of the Central Chancery of the Orders of Knighthood, since 2019

== See also ==
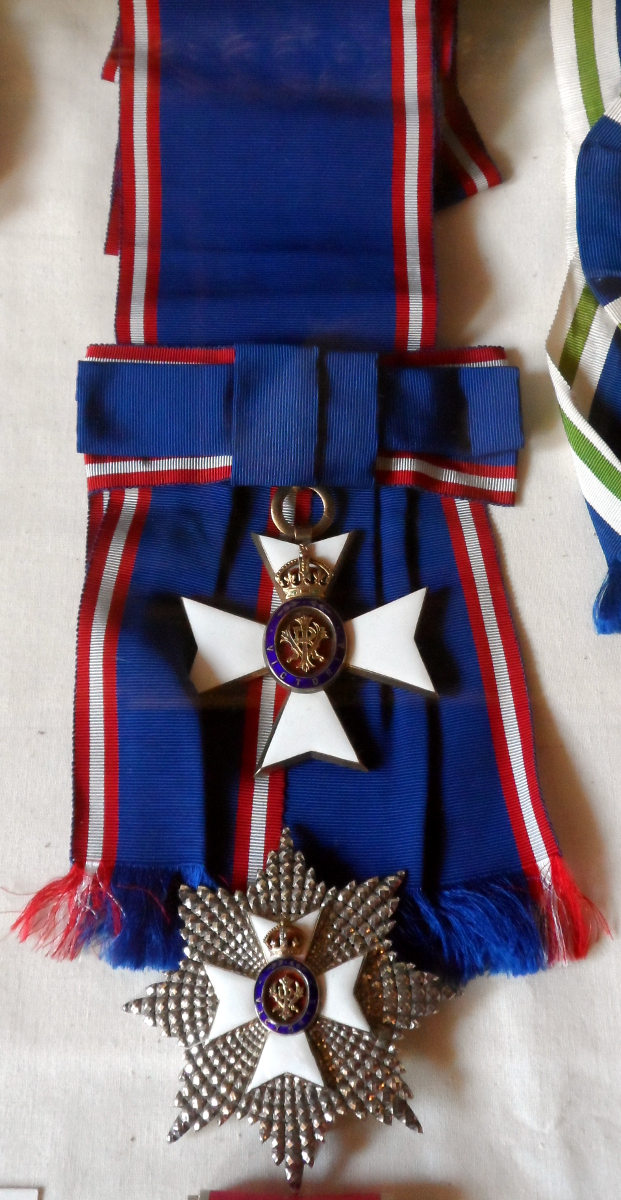
Star and riband of a Knight Grand Cross of the Royal Victorian Order

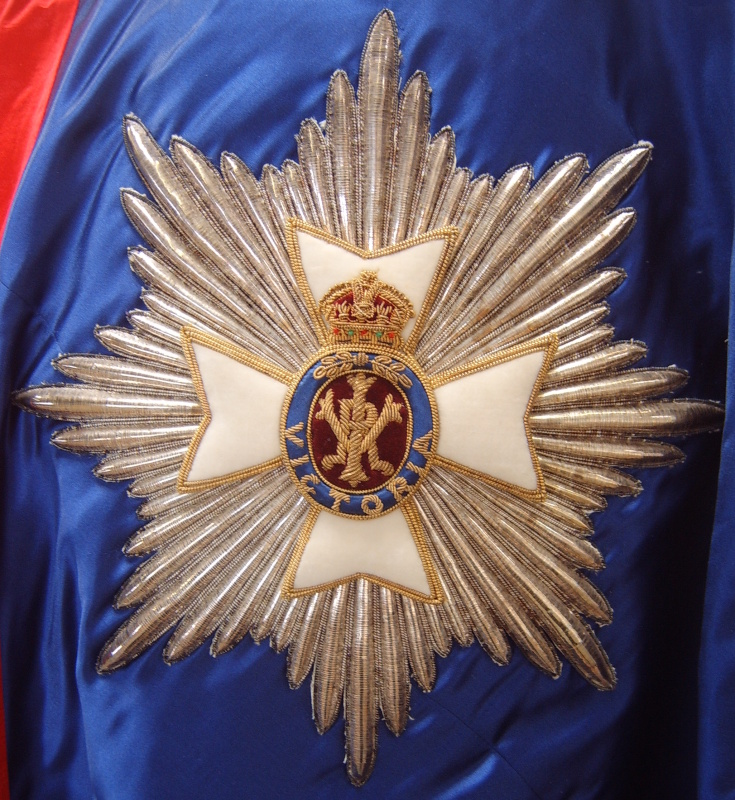
A detailed view of a stumpwork and goldwork embroidered star of a Knight or Dame Grand Cross of the Royal Victorian Order

- List of knights grand cross of the Royal Victorian Order appointed by Victoria
- List of knights commander of the Royal Victorian Order appointed by Victoria
- List of knights grand cross of the Royal Victorian Order appointed by Edward VII
- List of knights commander of the Royal Victorian Order appointed by Edward VII
- List of knights grand cross of the Royal Victorian Order appointed by George V
- List of knights commander of the Royal Victorian Order appointed by George V
- List of knights and dames of the Royal Victorian Order appointed by Edward VIII
- List of knights and dames grand cross of the Royal Victorian Order appointed by George VI
- List of knights and dames commander of the Royal Victorian Order appointed by George VI
- List of knights and dames grand cross of the Royal Victorian Order appointed by Elizabeth II (1952–1977)
- List of knights and dames grand cross of the Royal Victorian Order appointed by Elizabeth II (1978–2002)
- List of knights and dames grand cross of the Royal Victorian Order appointed by Elizabeth II (2003–2022)
- List of knights and dames commander of the Royal Victorian Order appointed by Elizabeth II (1952–1977)
- List of knights and dames commander of the Royal Victorian Order appointed by Elizabeth II (1978–2002)
- List of knights and dames commander of the Royal Victorian Order appointed by Elizabeth II (2003–2022)
- List of knights and dames grand cross of the Royal Victorian Order appointed by Charles III
- List of knights and dames commander of the Royal Victorian Order appointed by Charles III
- Royal Victorian Chain
- Royal Victorian Medal
- List of people who have declined a British honour
