= List of knights and dames commander of the Royal Victorian Order appointed by George VI =

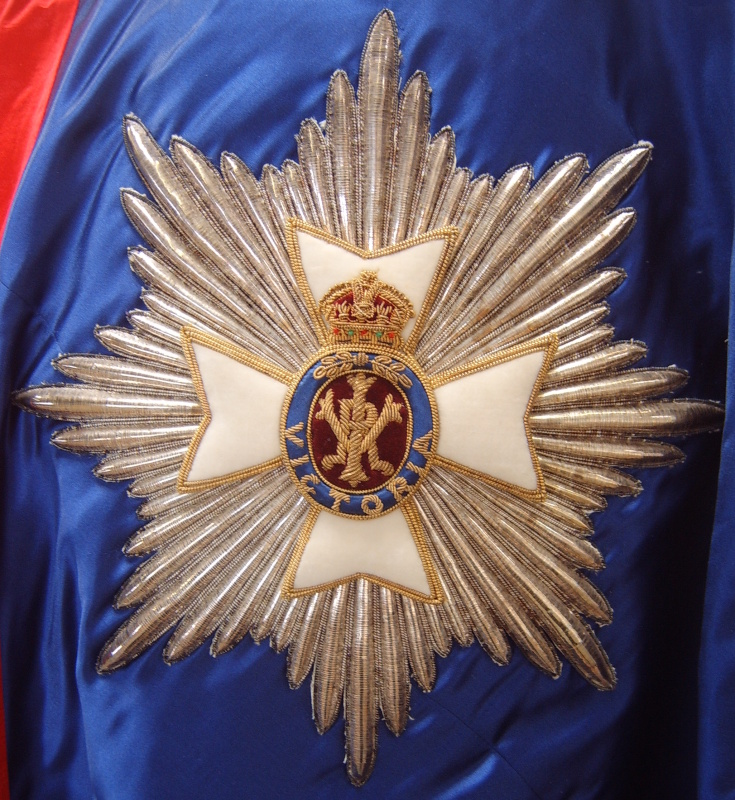
The star of a Knight or Dame Grand Cross of the Royal Victorian Order

The Royal Victorian Order is an order of knighthood awarded by the sovereign of the United Kingdom and several Commonwealth realms. It is granted personally by the monarch and recognises personal service to the monarchy, the Royal Household, royal family members, and the organisation of important royal events. The order was officially created and instituted on 23 April 1896 by letters patent under the Great Seal of the Realm by Queen Victoria. It was instituted with five grades, the two highest of which were Knight Grand Cross (GCVO) and Knight Commander (KCVO), which conferred the status of knighthood on holders (apart from foreigners, who typically received honorary awards not entitling them to the style of a knight). Women were not admitted until Edward VIII altered the statutes of the order in 1936; those receiving the highest two awards were styled dames and those grades, when conferred on women, are Dame Grand Cross and Dame Commander (DCVO).

No limit was placed on the number of appointments which could be made. King George VI (reigned 1937–52) appointed 102 Knights Commander and nine Dames Commander of the order.

== Knights and dames commander appointed by George VI ==
The list below is ordered by date of appointment. Full names, ranks and titles are given where applicable, as correct at the time of appointment to the order. Branch of service or regiment details are given in parentheses to distinguish them from offices. The names, dates, offices and occasions listed are those given by Peter Galloway in his 1996 history of the order, Royal Service.

Name	Date	Notes
Lord Claud Nigel Hamilton, CMG, CVO, DSO	1 February 1937	Comptroller and Treasurer to Queen Mary
John Fraser, MC	1 February 1937	Surgeon to the King in Scotland
Walter Turner Mockton, MC, KC	1 February 1937	Attorney-General, Duchy of Cornwall
Edward Howard Marsh, CB, CMB, CVO	11 February 1937	Private Secretary to the Secretaries of State for Dominions and Colonies
Lady Helen Cynthia Colville	11 May 1937	Woman of the Bedchamber to Queen Mary
Lady Helen Violet Graham	11 May 1937	Woman of the Bedchamber to Queen Mary
James Ulick Francis Canning Alexander, CMG, CVO, OBE	11 May 1937	Keeper of the Privy Purse and Extra Equerry to the King
Sir John Atkins, KCMG	11 May 1937	Physician to the Duke of Connaught
George Nevile Maltby Bland, CMG	11 May 1937	Counselor, Foreign Office
Bertram Norman Sergison-Brooke, CB, CMG, DSO	11 May 1937	General Officer Commanding, London District
The Hon. Gerald Henry Crofton Chichester, CVO	11 May 1937	Private Secretary to Queen Mary
Sir Smith Hill Child, Bt, CB, CMG, CVO, DSO	11 May 1937	Master of the Household and Extra Equerry to the King
Arthur William Steuart Cochrane, CVO	11 May 1937	Clarenceux King of Arms
Sir Henry Walford Davies, CVO, OBE	11 May 1937	Master of the King's Music
Alan John Hunter, CB, CMG, DSO, MC	11 May 1937	Director of Personal Service, War Office
Robert Uchtred Eyre Knox, CVO, DSO	11 May 1937	Private Secretary and Ceremonial Officer, HM Treasury
George Frederic Still	11 May 1937	Extra Physician to the King
Sir Hugh Stephenson Turnbull, KBE	11 May 1937	Commissioner of Police for the City of London
Sir George Thomas Broadbridge	19 May 1937	Lord Mayor of London
Gerald Charles Dickens, CB, CMG	20 May 1937	On the occasion of the Coronation Review by the King at Spithead
Dudley Burton Napier North, CB, CSI, CMG, CVO	20 May 1937	Vice Admiral Commanding HM Yachts
The Baron Marchwood	8 June 1937	Treasurer of the Household
Frank Herbert Mitchell, CVO, CBE	14 June 1937	Assistant Private Secretary to the King
Sir Charles Patrick Duff, KCB, CVO	23 July 1937	Secretary of the Office of Works
Anne Annette Minna Cochrane	1 January 1938	Lady-in-Waiting to Princess Beatrice
Alfred Edwin Dunphie, CVO	1 January 1938	Director of Coutts and Company; formerly Assistant Treasurer to Queen Alexandra
John Berkeley Monck, CMG, CVO	1 January 1938	Vice-Marshal of the Diplomatic Corps
The Baron Templemore, DSO, OBE	9 June 1938	Formerly Captain of the Yeoman of the Guard
Lord Esme Charles Gordon-Lennox, CMG, DSO, MVO	2 January 1939	Formerly Yeoman-Usher of the Black Rod and Secretary to the Lord Great Chamberlain
The Viscount Gage	10 April 1939	On relinquishing his appointment as Lord-in-Waiting to the King
The Baroness Elphinstone	8 June 1939	
Alan Frederick Lascelles, CB, CMG, MVO, MC	8 June 1939	Private Secretary to the King and Keeper of the King's Archives
George Arthur Ponsonby, CVO	8 June 1939	Comptroller and Private Secretary to the Queen of Norway
Arthur Shuldham Redfern	15 June 1939	Secretary to the Governor General of Canada. Appointed on the occasion of the King and Queen's visit to Canada and the United States.
George Frederick Basset Edward-Collins, CB, CVO	17 June 1939	Appointed on the occasion of the King and Queen's visit to Canada and the United States.
Sir Ulick Roland Burke	5 July 1939	Vice-President, Royal Agricultural Society
Walter Gordon Neale, CIE, CVO	1 January 1941	Political Aide-de-Camp to the Secretary of State for India
The Hon. Piers Walter Legh, CMG, CIE, CVO, OBE	1 January 1942	Master of the Household and Extra Equerry to the King
Sir Rupert Beswicke Howorth, KCMG, CB	11 June 1942	Appointed for services as Clerk to the Privy Council
Sir Alfred Edward Webb-Johnson, CBE, DSO, TD	11 June 1942	Surgeon to Queen Mary
Walter Rangeley Maitland Lamb, CVO	1 January 1943	Secretary of the Royal Academy of Arts
Harold George Campbell, CVO, DSO	2 June 1943	Equerry and Groom of the Robes to the King
Sir Eric Charles Miéville, KCIE, CSI, CMG	2 June 1943	Assistant Private Secretary to the King
Henry Hudson Fraser Stockley, CVO, OBE	2 June 1943	Secretary, Central Chancery of the Orders of Knighthood and Serjeant-at-Arms to the King
Sir Harold Brewer Hartley, CBE, MC	1 January 1944	Vice-President, LMS Railway Company. Appointed in connection with the Royal Train.
Sir Ernest Henry Pooley	1 January 1944	Honorary Secretary, King Edward VII's Hospital Fund for London
Charles Alfred Howard, DSO	8 June 1944	Serjeant-at-Arms, House of Commons
Owen Frederick Morshead, CVO, DSO, MC	8 June 1944	Librarian, Windsor Castle and Assistant Keeper of the King's Archives
Lionel George Logue, CVO	8 June 1944	For professional personal services to the King (speech therapist)
Algar Henry Stafford Howard, CB, CVO, MC	9 June 1944	Garter King of Arms
Sir Brian Hubert Robertson, Bt, CB, CBE, DSO, MC	30 July 1944	Appointed on the occasion of the King's visit to Italy.
Lady Isobel Constance Mary Gathorne-Hardy	1 January 1945	Formerly Vice President, Queen Alexandra's Army Nursing Board
Clarence Henry Kennett Marten	1 January 1945	Provost of Eton College
Louis Forbes Fergusson, CVO	14 June 1945	Clerk of the Council and Keeper of the Records, Duchy of Lancaster
Sir Eric Robert Dalrymple Maclagan, CBE	14 June 1945	Director and Secretary, Victoria and Albert Museum
Terence Edmund Gascoigne Nugent, CVO, MC	14 June 1945	Comptroller, Lord Chamberlain's Office and Extra Equerry to the King
The Countess Granville	6 July 1945	
The Earl Granville, CB, DSO	6 July 1945	Lieutenant Governor of the Isle of Man
Lady Louis Mountbatten, CBE	1 January 1946	For war services
Sir William Stewart Duke-Elder	1 January 1946	Surgeon-Oculist to the King
Thomas Innes of Learney	13 June 1946	Lord Lyon King of Arms and Secretary to the Order of the Thistle
Dermot McMorrough Kavanagh, CVO	13 June 1946	Crown Equerry
The Earl of Radnor	13 June 1946	Lord Warden of the Stannaries in Cornwall and Devon
The Hon. Jasper Nicholas Ridley, OBE, TD	13 June 1946	Chairman of Messrs Coutts and Company
Leighton Seymour Bracegirdle, CMG, DSO	1 January 1947	Official Secretary to the Duke of Gloucester when Governor General of Australia
Sir Alfred James Munnings	1 January 1947	President, Royal Academy
Evelyn Campbell Shaw, CVO	1 January 1947	Secretary, Royal Commission for the Exhibition of 1851
Sir Henry Charles Loyd, KCB, DSO, MC	30 January 1947	General Officer Commanding, London District
Sir Eubule John Waddington, KCMG, OBE	12 April 1947	Governor of Northern Rhodesia. Appointed on the occasion of the King and Queen's visit.
Sir John Noble Kennedy, KBE, CB, MC	14 April 1947	Governor of Southern Rhodesia. Appointed on the occasion of the King and Queen's visit.
The Hon. Sir Evelyn Baring, KCMG	23 April 1947	High Commissioner for the United Kingdom in South Africa. Appointed on the occasion of the King and Queen's visit.
The Baroness Harlech	12 June 1947	Extra Lady of the Bedchamber to the Queen
Sir Hugh Lett, Bt, CBE	12 June 1947	Honorary Secretary, King Edward VII's Hospital Fund for London
Sir Aubrey Clare Hugh Smith, KBE, CB, MVO	12 June 1947	Outgoing Chairman and formerly Deputy Chairman, King George's Fund for Sailors.
Henry Ellis Yeo White, CVO, CBE	12 June 1947	Appointed on the occasion of the King and Queen's visit to South Africa
William Gladstone Agnew, CB, CVO, DSO	12 June 1947	Captain, HMS Vanguard. Appointed on the occasion of the King and Queen's visit to South Africa.
Lewis Anselm da Costa Ritchie, CVO, CBE	5 November 1947	Appointed on retirement as Press Secretary to the King.
Roland Clive Wallace Burn, CVO	1 January 1948	Secretary and Keeper of the Records, Duchy of Lancaster
The Very Rev. Alan Campbell Don	1 January 1948	Dean of Westminster.
Sir Bracewell Smith, Bt	1 January 1948	For services while Lord Mayor of London to King George VI
Denholme de Montalte Stuart Fraser, CSI, CIE	20 February 1948	Political Aide-de-Camp to the Secretary of State for India
Jameson Boyd Adams, CVO, CBE, DSO	10 June 1948	Secretary of King George's Jubilee Trust
Walter Leslie Farrer	10 June 1948	The Queen's Private Solicitor
Louis William Howard Kerr, CMG, CVO, OBE	10 June 1948	Comptroller to the Duke of Gloucester
Arthur Noel Mobbs, OBE	10 June 1948	"In connection with the Royal Albert School".
Ernest Dudley Gordon Colles, CVO, OBE	1 January 1949	Deputy Treasurer to the King and Assistant Keeper of the Privy Purse
Sir William Gilliatt, CVO	1 January 1949	For personal services to Princess Elizabeth, Duchess of Edinburgh.
Prof. James Rögnvald Learmonth, CBE	25 March 1949	For professional services as Surgeon to the King.
Prof. Horace Evans	3 May 1949	For professional services to the King.
Prof. James Paterson Ross	3 May 1949	For personal services during the illness of the King.
Sir John Herbert McCutcheon Craig, CB	9 June 1949	Deputy Master and Comptroller, Royal Mint.
Arthur Horace Penn, CVO, MC	9 June 1949	Groom in Waiting and Extra Equerry to the King.
Edward Daymonde Stevenson, CVO, MC	9 June 1949	Purse Bearer to the Duke of Gloucester when Lord High Commissioner to the General Assembly of the Church of Scotland
Harold Kingston Graham Hodgson, CVO	2 January 1950	Middlesex Hospital. For professional services.
The Very Rev. Charles Laing Warr, CVO	2 January 1950	Dean, Chapel Royal in Scotland and the Order of the Thistle
Norman Richard Combe Warwick, CVO, OBE	2 January 1950	Clerk of the Council, Duchy of Lancaster
John Charles Oakes Marriott, CB, CVO, DSO, MC	21 February 1950	General Officer Commanding, London District
George Camborne Beauclerk Paynter, CMG, CVO, DSO	8 June 1950	Groom in Waiting and Extra Equerry to the King; Lord Lieutenant of Sutherland.
Henry Abel Smith, DSO	8 June 1950	
Lady Adelaide Margaret Peel, CVO	3 September 1950	Extra Woman of the Bedchamber to the Queen
Daniel Thomas Davies, CVO	1 January 1951	Extra Physician to the King
Norman Wilmshurst Gwatkin, CVO, DSO	1 January 1951	Assistant Comptroller, Lord Chamberlain's Office
Sir Gerald Robert Stedall Hickson, CB, CBE	1 January 1951	General Secretary, King George's Fund for Sailors
Francis Hugo Teale, CVO	1 January 1951	For professional services to the King.
Michael Edward Adeane, CB, MVO	7 June 1951	Assistant Private Secretary and Extra Equerry to the King
Sir Eric Cyril Egerton Leadbitter, CVO	7 June 1951	Clerk of the Privy Council
Geoffrey Sidney Todd, CVO, OBE	7 June 1951	Medical Superintendent, King Edward VII Sanatorium, Midhurst (Easebourne parish)
Geoffrey Marshall, CBE	13 December 1951	For professional personal services to the King
Clement Price Thomas	13 December 1951	For professional personal services to the King
North Victor Cecil Dalrymple-Hamilton of Bargany, CB, CVO	1 January 1952	Adjutant of the Royal Company of Archers
Robert McCalmont, CVO, CBE, DSO	1 January 1952	Lieutenant of the Yeoman of the Guard
Sydney Arthur White, MVO	1 January 1952	Grand Secretary, United Grand Lodge of England
