= List of knights grand cross of the Royal Victorian Order appointed by George V =

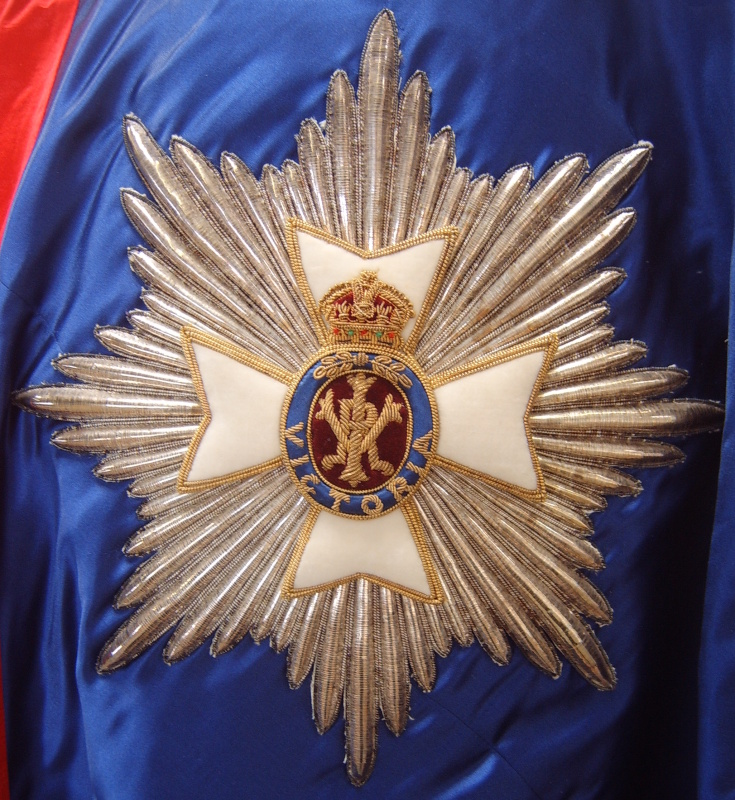
The star of a Knight or Dame Grand Cross of the Royal Victorian Order

The Royal Victorian Order is an order of knighthood awarded by the sovereign of the United Kingdom and several Commonwealth realms. It is granted personally by the monarch and recognises personal service to the monarchy, the Royal Household, royal family members, and the organisation of important royal events. The order was officially created and instituted on 23 April 1896 by letters patent under the Great Seal of the Realm by Queen Victoria. It was instituted with five grades, the two highest of which were Knight Grand Cross (GCVO) and Knight Commander (KCVO), which conferred the status of knighthood on holders (apart from foreigners, who typically received honorary awards not entitling them to the style of a knight). Women were not admitted until George V's successor Edward VIII altered the statutes of the order in 1936.

No limit was placed on the number of appointments which could be made. George V appointed 160 Knights Grand Cross to the order between succeeding to the throne on 6 May 1910 and his death on 20 January 1936 (an average of approximately 6.25 a year).

== List of knights grand cross ==
Source: list in Galloway, pp. 209–212.

Name	Date of appointment	Notes	Refs
Lieutenant-Colonel Sir Charles Arthur Andrew Frederick, KCVO	3 June 1910	Master of the Household	
Prince George William Christian Albert Edward Alexander Frederick Waldemar Ernest Adolphus of Cumberland, Hereditary Prince of Hanover	8 June 1910	(Honorary Appointment)	
General Rt Hon. Paul Sanford Methuen, 3rd Baron Methuen, GCB, KCVO, CMG	2 November 1910	General Officer Commanding-in-Chief, South Africa. Appointed on the occasion of the Duke of Connaught's visit to South Africa to open the Parliament of the Union of South Africa	
Most Rev. William Alexander	7 February 1911	Archbishop of Armagh and Primate Metropolitan of all Ireland	
Prince Alexander Albert of Battenberg	19 June 1911	Appointed on the occasion of the coronation of George V and Queen Mary	
Rt Hon. Edwyn Francis Scudamore-Stanhope, 10th Earl of Chesterfield, PC	19 June 1911	Lord Steward. Appointed on the occasion of the coronation of George V and Queen Mary	
Rt Hon. Charles Robert Spencer, 6th Earl Spencer, PC	19 June 1911	Lord Chamberlain. Appointed on the occasion of the coronation of George V and Queen Mary	
Rt Hon. John Baring, 2nd Baron Revelstoke, PC	19 June 1911	Receiver-General, Duchy of Cornwall. Appointed on the occasion of the coronation of George V and Queen Mary	
Hon. Sir Schomberg Kerr McDonnell, KCB, CVO	19 June 1911	Secretary to the Office of Works. Appointed on the occasion of the coronation of George V and Queen Mary	
Lieutenant-Colonel Rt Hon. Sir William Henry Peregrine Carington, KCVO, CB	19 June 1911	Appointed on the occasion of the coronation of George V and Queen Mary	
Sir Edward Richard Henry, KCB, KCVO, CSI	19 June 1911	Commissioner of Police of the Metropolis. Appointed on the occasion of the coronation of George V and Queen Mary	
Colonel Sir Douglas Frederick Rawdon Dawson, KCVO, CMG	19 June 1911	Comptroller, Lord Chamberlain's Department. Appointed on the occasion of the coronation of George V and Queen Mary	
Admiral Sir Arthur William Moore, GCB, KCVO, CMG	24 June 1911	Commander-in-Chief, Portsmouth. Appointed on the occasion of the Review of the Fleet at Portsmouth.	
Admiral Sir Francis Charles Bridgeman Bridgeman, KCB, KCVO	24 June 1911	Commander-in-Chief, Home Fleet. Appointed on the occasion of the Review of the Fleet at Portsmouth.	
Rt Hon. John Campbell Hamilton-Gordon, 7th Earl of Aberdeen, KT, GCMG, PC	12 July 1911	Lord Lieutenant of Ireland. Appointed on the occasion of the King's visit to Dublin.	
General Hon. Sir Neville Gerald Lyttelton, GCB	12 July 1911	Commander-in-Chief, Ireland. Appointed on the occasion of the King's visit to Dublin.	
Sir John Williams, 1st Baronet, KCVO	15 July 1911	President, National Library of Wales. Appointed on the occasion of the King's visit to Wales.	
Nawab Sir Muhammed Hamid Ali Khan Bahadur, GCIE	12 December 1911	Attached to the King's suite during the King and Queen's visit to India; also Master of Ceremonies at the Delhi Durbar	
Lieutenant-Colonel Sir Arthur Henry McMahon, KCIE, CSI	12 December 1911	Secretary to the Government of India, Foreign Department, Master of Ceremonies, King-Emperor's Coronation Durbar at Delhi, and an Additional Member of the Council of the Governor-General for making Laws and Regulations. Attached to the King's suite during the King and Queen's visit to India.	
Maharaja Bahadur Sir Pratap Singh, GCSI, KCB	12 December 1911	Regent of Jodhpur. Attached to the King's suite during the King and Queen's visit to India.	
Major-General Maharaja Sir Chandra Shamsher Jang, Bahadur Rana, GCB, GCSI	24 December 1911	Prime Minister and Marshal of Nepal. Appointed on the occasion of the King's visit to Nepal.	
Maharao Raja Sir Radhubir Singh, GCIE, KCSI	10 January 1912	Maharao Raja of Bundi. Appointed on the occasion of the King's visit to India.	
Lieutenant-General Sir Francis Reginald Wingate, KCB, KCMG, DSO	17 January 1912	Governor-General of the Sudan and Sirdar of the Egyptian Army. Appointed on the occasion of the King's visit to Port Sudan.	
General Sir Henry Macleod Leslie Rundle, GCB, KCMG, DSO	26 January 1912	Governor of Malta. Appointed on the occasion of the King's visit to Malta.	
Admiral Sir Edmund Samuel Poë, KCB, KCVO	26 January 1912	Commander-in-Chief, Mediterranean Fleet. Appointed on the occasion of the King's visit to Malta.	
General Sir Archibald Hunter, GCB, DSO	31 January 1912	Governor of Gibraltar. Appointed on the occasion of the King's visit to Gibraltar.	
Rt Hon. John George Lambton, 3rd Earl of Durham, KG	4 February 1912	Lord High Steward. Appointed on the occasion of the King's visit to India	
Lieutenant-Colonel Sir Richard Havelock Charles, KCVO	4 February 1912	Serjeant-Surgeon to the King. Appointed on the occasion of the King's visit to India.	
Vice-Admiral Sir George Astley Callaghan, KCB, KCVO	11 May 1912	Commander-in-Chief, Home Fleet. Appointed on the occasion of the King's visit to the Home Fleets at Weymouth.	
Admiral Sir Archibald Berkeley Milne, 2nd Baronet, KCB, KCVO	14 June 1912	Commander-in-Chief, Mediterranean Fleet	
William Thomas Lewis, 1st Baron Merthyr, KCVO	28 June 1912	Deputy Lieutenant of Glamorganshire. Appointed on the occasion of the King's visit to Wales	
Victor Christian William Cavendish, 9th Duke of Devonshire, PC	19 August 1912	Appointed on the occasion of the King's visit to Bolton Abbey	
Idris I, Sultan of Perak, GCMG	3 June 1913		
Sir Henry Crofton Lowther, KCMG	11 May 1914	British Ambassador to Denmark. Appointed on the occasion of the King of Denmark's visit to England.	
Rt Hon. Granville George Leveson-Gower, 3rd Earl Granville, CVO	22 June 1914	Lord-in-Waiting to the King	
Prince Leopold Arthur Louis of Battenberg, KCVO	1 January 1915		
Rt Hon. Bernard Arthur William Patrick Hastings Forbes, 8th Earl of Granard, KP, PC	21 June 1915	Master of the Horse	
Admiral Hon. Sir Stanley Cecil James Colville, KCB, CVO	9 July 1915	Admiral Commanding, Orkneys and Shetlands. Appointed on the occasion of the King's visit to the Grand Fleet.	
Hon. Sir Derek William George Keppel, KCVO, CMG, CIE	1 January 1916	Master of the Household and Extra Equerry to the King	
Rt Hon. William Mansfield, 2nd Baron Sandhurst, GCSI, GCIE, PC	3 June 1916	Lord Chamberlain	
Admiral Sir John Rushworth Jellicoe, GCB, OM, KCVO	17 June 1916	Commander-in-Chief, Grand Fleet	
General Sir Douglas Haig, GCB, KCIE, KCVO	15 August 1916	Appointed on the occasion of a visit of the King to the Army in the Field.	
Rt Hon. Alexander Hugh Bruce, 6th Baron Balfour of Burleigh, KT, GCMG, PC	1 January 1917		
Rt Hon. Luke White, 3rd Baron Annaly, KCVO	1 January 1917	Permanent Lord-in-Waiting to the King.	
Sir Francis John Stephens Hopwood, GCB, GCMG	4 June 1917		
Admiral Sir David Beatty, GCB, KCVO, DSO	25 June 1917	Appointed on the occasion of the King's visit to the Grand Fleet.	
Admiral Sir Frederick Tower Hamilton, KCB, CVO	25 June 1917	Appointed on the occasion of the King's visit to the Grand Fleet.	
General Sir Herbert Charles Onslow Plumer, GCMG, KCB	14 July 1917	Appointed on the occasion of the King's visit to the Army in the Field.	
General Sir Henry Seymour Rawlinson, 2nd Baronet, KCB, KCVO	14 July 1917	Appointed on the occasion of the King's visit to the Army in the Field.	
Hon. Sir Lancelot Douglas Carnegie, KCMG, MVO	18 October 1917	British Ambassador to Portugal	
Maharaja-dhiraja Maharana Sir Fateh Singh Bahadur, of Udaipur, GCSI, GCIE	22 December 1917		
Rt Hon. James Bryce, 1st Viscount Bryce, OM, PC	22 December 1917		
Sir Bertrand Edward Dawson, KCVO, CB	22 December 1917	Physician to the King	
Colonel Sir Walter Roper Lawrence, 1st Baronet, GCIE, CB	3 June 1918	President, Union Jack Club	
Sir Edward John Poynter, 1st Baronet, CVO	3 June 1918	President, Royal Academy of Arts	
Lieutenant-General Sir Alfred Henry Keogh, GCB, CH	3 June 1918	Formerly Director-General, Army Medical Service	
Rt Hon. William Henry Berkeley Portman, 2nd Viscount Portman	20 July 1918	Appointed on the occasion of the King and Queen's Silver Wedding Anniversary	
Major-General Sir Francis Lloyd, KCB, CVO, DSO	14 September 1918	General Officer Commanding-in-Chief, London District	
Major-General Sir Ganga Singh Bahadur, Maharaja of Bikanir, GCSI, GCIE, KCB	1 January 1919		
Rt Hon. Richard Farrer Herschell, 2nd Baron Herschell	1 January 1919	Lord-in-Waiting to the King	
Commander Sir Charles Leopold Cust, 3rd Baronet, KCVO, CB, CMG, CIE	1 January 1919	Equerry to the King	
Lieutenant-Colonel Rt Hon. Lord Edmund Bernard Talbot, DSO, MVO	3 June 1919	Deputy Earl Marshal of England	
Rt Hon. Sir George Herbert Murray, GCB, ISO	1 January 1920	Chairman, Royal Household Committee	
Edward Albert Christian George Andrew Patrick David, Prince of Wales, KG, PC, GCMG, GBE, ISO, MC	13 March 1920		
Rt Hon. Arthur Henry John Walsh, 3rd Baron Ormathwaite, KCVO	5 June 1920	Formerly Master of the Ceremonies to the King	
Colonel Hon. Sir Henry Charles Legge, KCVO	5 June 1920	Paymaster of the Household	
Admiral Sir Charles Edward Madden, 1st Baronet, GCB, KCMG, CVO	23 July 1920	Commander-in-Chief, Atlantic Fleet. Appointed on the occasion of the King's visit to the Clyde, Isle of Man and Wales	
Rear-Admiral Sir Lionel Halsey, KCMG, KCVO, CB	11 October 1920	Chief of Staff to the Prince of Wales. Appointed on the occasion of the Prince's visit to Australia and New Zealand	
Prince Albert Frederick Arthur George, Duke of York, KG	1 January 1921		
Rt Hon. Adelbert Wellington Brownlow-Cust, 3rd Earl Brownlow, PC	1 January 1921	Lord Lieutenant of Lincolnshire	
Rt Hon. Sir Frederick Edward Grey Ponsonby, KCB, KCVO	1 January 1921	Treasurer and Extra Equerry to the King and Keeper of the Privy Purse	
The Hon. Sir William Charles Wentworth Fitzwilliam, KCVO	1 January 1921	Crown Equerry	
Vice-Admiral Isamu Takeshita	May 1921	On the occasion of the visit of the Crown Prince of Japan to the United Kingdom.	
Lieutenant-General Takeji Nara	May 1921	On the occasion of the visit of the Crown Prince of Japan to the United Kingdom.	
Dr Kinnosuke Miura	May 1921	On the occasion of the visit of the Crown Prince of Japan to the United Kingdom.	
Viscount Tamenmori Iryie	May 1921	On the occasion of the visit of the Crown Prince of Japan to the United Kingdom.	
Vice-Admiral Kosaburo Oguri	May 1921	Commander-in-Chief, Escorting Squadron. On the occasion of the visit of the Crown Prince of Japan to the United Kingdom.	
Baron Gonsuke Hayashi	May 1921	Japanese Ambassador. On the occasion of the visit of the Crown Prince of Japan to the United Kingdom.	
Colonel Sir Arthur Davidson, KCB, KCVO	4 June 1921	Extra Equerry to the King and Equerry to Queen Alexandra	
The Prince Henry William Frederick Albert, KG	2 January 1922		
Rt Hon. Frederick Rudolph Lambart, 10th Earl of Cavan, KP, GCMG, KCB, MVO	2 January 1922	Appointed in recognition of services given to the Prince of Wales in France	
Rt Hon. Henry Ulick Lascelles, 5th Earl of Harewood, KCVO	27 February 1922	Appointed on the occasion of Princess Mary's marriage to Viscount Lascelles	
Sir Bhupinder Singh, Maharaja of Patiala, GCSI, GCIE, GBE	17 March 1922	Appointed on the occasion of the Prince of Wales's visit to India	
Rt Hon. Sir George Dixon Grahame, KCMG, KCVO	13 May 1922	British Ambassador to Belgium. Appointed on the occasion of the King's visit to Brussels	
Rt Hon. Rufus Daniel Isaacs, 1st Earl of Reading, GCB, GCSI, GCIE, KCVO, PC	3 June 1922	Viceroy of India. For services to the Prince of Wales during his visit to India	
Rt Hon. Savile Brinton Crossley, 1st Baron Somerleyton, KCVO	3 June 1922	Honorary Secretary, King Edward's Hospital Fund for London	
General Sir George Wentworth Alexander Higginson, GCB	21 June 1922	Colonel, Worcestershire Regiment	
His Grace John George Stewart-Murray, 8th Duke of Atholl, KT, CB, DSO, MVO, PC	1 January 1923	Lord Chamberlain	
Lieutenant-General Sir Robert Stephenson Smyth Baden-Powell, 1st Baronet, KCB, KCVO	1 January 1923	Chief Scout, Scouts Association	
Rt Hon. Claude George Bowes-Lyon, 14th Earl of Strathmore and Kinghorne	26 April 1923	Lord Lieutenant of Forfarshire and President, Forfar Territorial Army Association. Appointed on the occasion of his daughter's marriage to HRH The Duke of York.	
Rt Hon. Sir Ronald William Graham, KCMG, CB	14 May 1923	British Ambassador to Italy. Appointed on the occasion of the King's visit to Rome	
Aga Khan III, GCSI, GCIE	30 May 1923		
Rt Hon. Reginald Brabazon, 12th Earl of Meath, KP, GBE, PC	2 June 1923	Founder of the Empire Day Movement	
Rt Hon. Andrew Graham Murray, 1st Baron Dunedin, KCVO, PC	2 June 1923	Chairman, Cabinet Committee on Honours	
Rt Hon. Anthony Ashley-Cooper, 9th Earl of Shaftesbury, KP, KCVO, CBE, PC	1 January 1924	Lord Lieutenant of Dorset	
The Prince George Edward Alexander Edmund, KG	3 June 1924		
Admiral Sir John Michael de Robeck, 1st Baronet, GCB, GCMG	26 July 1924	Commander-in-Chief, Atlantic Fleet. Appointed on the occasion of the Naval Review at Spithead.	
Rt Hon. Weetman Dickinson Pearson, 1st Viscount Cowdray, PC	1 January 1925	Appointed following the restoration of St George's Chapel, Windsor	
Sir Aston Webb, KCVO, CB	1 January 1925	President, Royal Academy of Arts	
Rt Hon. Hugh Cecil Lowther, 5th Earl of Lonsdale	3 June 1925	Lord Lieutenant of Cumberland	
Rt Hon. William Henry Grenfell, 1st Baron Desborough, KCVO	3 June 1925	Captain of the Yeomen of the Guard	
Sir John Robert Chancellor, GCMG, DSO	7 July 1925	Governor of Southern Rhodesia. Appointed on the occasion of the Prince of Wales's visit.	
Sir Henry Streatfeild, KCVO, CB, CMG	26 November 1925	Private Secretary to Queen Alexandra and Extra Equerry to the King	
Rt Hon. Osbert Cecil Molyneux, 6th Earl of Sefton, PC	1 January 1926		
Admiral Hon. Sir Edmund Robert Fremantle, GCB, CMG	31 May 1926	Rear-Admiral of the United Kingdom	
Major-General Sir John Hanbury-Williams, KCB, KCVO, CMG	3 July 1926	Marshal of the Diplomatic Corps	
Rt Hon. Rowland Thomas Baring, 2nd Earl of Cromer, GCIE, CVO, PC	1 January 1927	Lord Chamberlain	
Rt Hon. Edward Arthur Colebrooke, 1st Baron Colebrooke, KCVO, PC	3 June 1927	Lord-in-Waiting to the King	
Lieutenant-Colonel Rt Hon. Amelius Richard Mark Lockwood, 1st Baron Lambourne, CVO, PC	3 June 1927	President, Royal Horticultural Society, and Lord Lieutenant of Essex	
Most Hon. Charles Henry Alexander Paget, 6th Marquess of Anglesey	2 January 1928	Lord Chamberlain to the Queen	
Sir Norman Fenwick Warren Fisher, GCB	2 January 1928	Secretary to the Treasury and Auditor of the Civil List	
Sir Francis Henry Humphrys, KBE, CIE	15 March 1928	British Minister at Kabul. Appointed on the occasion of King Amanullah of Afghanistan's visit to London.	
Rt Hon. William Heneage Legge, 6th Earl of Dartmouth, KCB, PC	4 June 1928		
Hon. Sir Cecil Edward Bingham, KCMG, CB, CVO	4 June 1928	Gold Stick and Colonel, The Life Guards	
Rt Hon. Sir John Anthony Cecil Tilley, GCMG, CB	10 May 1929	British Ambassador to Japan. Appointed on the occasion of the Duke of Gloucester's Garter Mission to Japan.	
Sir Humphry Davy Rolleston, 1st Baronet, KCB	3 June 1929	Physician Extraordinary to the King	
Sir Edward William Wallington, KCVO, CMG	3 June 1929	Groom in Waiting to the King and Treasurer to the Queen	
His Grace Henry Hugh Arthur FitzRoy Somerset, 10th Duke of Beaufort	1 January 1930		
Rt Hon. Sir Frederick George Milner, 7th Baronet	1 January 1930	Honorary Treasurer, Village Centres for Ex-Service Men	
Admiral Sir Colin Richard Keppel, KCIE, KCVO, CB, DSO	1 January 1930	Serjeant-at-Arms of the House of Commons and Extra Equerry to the King	
Rt Hon. Stanley Owen Buckmaster, 1st Baron Buckmaster, PC	3 June 1930	Member of the Council, Duchy of Lancaster	
Lieutenant-General Sir William Pulteney Pulteney, KCB, KCMG, KCVO, DSO	3 June 1930	Gentleman Usher of the Black Rod	
Admiral Sir Henry Tritton Buller, KCVO, CB	11 August 1930	Appointed on relinquishing command of the King's yachts; also an Extra Equerry to the King	
Rt Hon. Arnold Allan Cecil Keppel, 8th Earl of Albemarle, KCVO, CB	1 January 1931		
Rt Hon. James Buchanan, 1st Baron Woolavington	1 January 1931		
The Hon. Sir Seymour John Fortescue, KCVO, CMG	1 January 1931	Extra Equerry to the King	
Field Marshal Sir William Robert Robertson, 1st Baronet, GCB, GCMG, KCVO, DSO	3 June 1931	Gold Stick and Colonel, Royal Horse Guards. Appointed on the occasion of the King's birthday.	
Sir Samuel Henry William Llewellyn, KCVO	3 June 1931	Painter of the Coronation Portrait of the Queen	
Most Hon. George Louis Victor Henry Serge Mountbatten, 2nd Marquess of Milford Haven, KCVO	1 January 1932		
Rt Hon. Simon Joseph Fraser, 14th Lord Lovat and 3rd Baron Lovat, KT, KCMG, KCVO, CB, DSO, TD	1 January 1932		
Captain Sir Bryan Godfrey Godfrey-Faussett, KCVO, CMG	1 January 1932		
Rt Hon. Sir Clive Wigram, KCB, KCVO, CSI	3 June 1932		
General Sir Bindon Blood, GCB	3 June 1932	Colonel Commandant, Royal Engineers	
Admiral Sir John Donald Kelly, KCB	13 July 1932	Commander-in-Chief, Home Fleet. Appointed on the occasion of the King's visit to the Home Fleet	
Most Hon. John Charles Pratt, 4th Marquess Camden	2 January 1933	Lord Lieutenant of Kent	
Admiral Sir Montague Edward Browning, GCB, GCMG, MVO	2 January 1933	Rear Admiral of the United Kingdom	
Sir Lionel Earle, KCB, KCVO, CMG	2 January 1933	Secretary to the Office of Works	
Rt Hon. Rudolph Robert Basil Aloysius Augustine Feilding, 9th Earl of Denbigh, 8th Earl of Desmond, KCVO, TD	2 March 1933	Colonel Commandant, Honourable Artillery Company	
Rt Hon. Charles John Robert Hepburn-Stuart-Forbes-Trefusis, 21st Baron Clinton, PC	3 June 1933	Lord Warden of the Stannaries	
The Hon. Sir George Arthur Charles Crichton, KCVO	3 June 1933	Comptroller, Lord Chamberlain's Office	
The Hon. Sir Henry Julian Stonor, KCVO	3 June 1933	Groom in Waiting and Gentleman Usher to the King; Secretary and Registrar of the Order of Merit	
Sir Edward Elgar, 1st Baronet, OM, KCVO	3 June 1933	Master of the King's Musick	
Rt Hon. Henry George Charles Lascelles, 6th Earl of Harewood, KG, DSO, TD	1 January 1934	Personal Aide-de-Camp to the King; President of the West Riding of Yorkshire Territorial Force Association; and Lord Lieutenant of the West Riding of Yorkshire	
William Legge, Viscount Lewisham, TD	1 January 1934	Lord Great Chamberlain	
Sir Maurice Pascal Alers Hankey, GCB, GCMG	1 January 1934	Cabinet Secretary; Secretary to the Committee of Imperial Defence; and Clerk of the Privy Council	
Most Hon. John Charles Montagu Douglas Scott, 7th Duke of Buccleuch and 9th Duke of Queensberry, KT	4 June 1934	Captain-General of the Royal Company of Archers	
Rt Hon. Edmund Henry Hynman Allenby, 1st Viscount Allenby, GCB, GCMG	4 June 1934	Gold Stick and Colonel, 1st Life Guards	
Sir John Milson Rees, KCVO	4 June 1934	Laryngologist to the King	
Edward Robert Peacock	4 June 1934	Receiver-General of the Duchy of Cornwall	
The Hon. Sir Herbert Meade-Fetherstonhaugh, KCVO, CB, DSO	16 August 1934	Commanding the King's Yachts and Extra Equerry to the King	
Rt Hon. Thomas Walter Brand, 3rd Viscount Hampden, KCB, CMG	1 January 1935	Lord-in-Waiting to the King and Lord Lieutenant of Hertfordshire	
Rt Hon. Charles Henry Wyndham, 3rd Baron Leconfield	1 January 1935	Member of the Council, Duchy of Lancaster, and Lord Lieutenant of Sussex	
Most Hon. George Francis Hugh Cambridge, 2nd Marquess of Cambridge, KCVO	3 June 1935		
Rt Hon. John Colin Campbell Davidson, CH, CB	3 June 1935	Chancellor of the Duchy of Lancaster	
Sir Hugh Percy Allen, KCVO	3 June 1935	Director, Royal College of Music	
Sir Arthur Edward Erskine, KCVO, DSO	3 June 1935	Crown Equerry	
Sir Edwin Cooper Perry	3 June 1935	Member of the General Council, King Edward's Hospital Fund for London	
Air Chief Marshal Sir Henry Robert Moore Brooke-Popham, KCB, CMG, DSO, AFC	6 July 1935	Air Officer Commanding-in-Chief, Air Defence of Great Britain. Appointed on the occasion of the Silver Jubilee Review of the Royal Air Force by the King.	
Rt Hon. Sir John Gilmour, 2nd Baronet, DSO	12 July 1935	Home Secretary during the Silver Jubilee Celebrations	
General The Hon. Sir John Francis Gathorne-Hardy, GCB, CMG, DSO	13 July 1935	General Officer Commanding-in-Chief, Aldershot Command. Appointed on occasion of the Silver Jubilee Review of the Troops by the King at Aldershot.	
Admiral Sir William Wordsworth Fisher, GCB, CVO	16 July 1935	Commander-in-Chief, Mediterranean Fleet. Appointed on the occasion of the Silver Jubilee Naval Review	
Admiral Rt Hon. William Henry Dudley Boyle, 12th Earl of Cork and 12th Earl of Orrery, KCB	16 July 1935	Commander-in-Chief, Home Fleet. Appointed on the occasion of the Silver Jubilee Naval Review	
Rt Hon. Hugh Montague Trenchard, 1st Baron Trenchard, GCB, DSO	20 July 1935	Commissioner of Police of the Metropolis. Appointed on the occasion of the Silver Jubilee Inspection of the Police.	
His Grace Walter John Montagu Douglas Scott, 8th Duke of Buccleuch and 10th Duke of Queensbury	26 November 1935		
Sir Alfred Edward Codrington, KCB, KCVO	1 January 1936	Colonel, Coldstream Guards	
Sir Harry Lloyd Verney, KCVO	1 January 1936	Private Secretary and Treasurer to Queen Mary and Extra Groom in Waiting to the King	
