= List of knights and dames of the Royal Victorian Order appointed by Edward VIII =

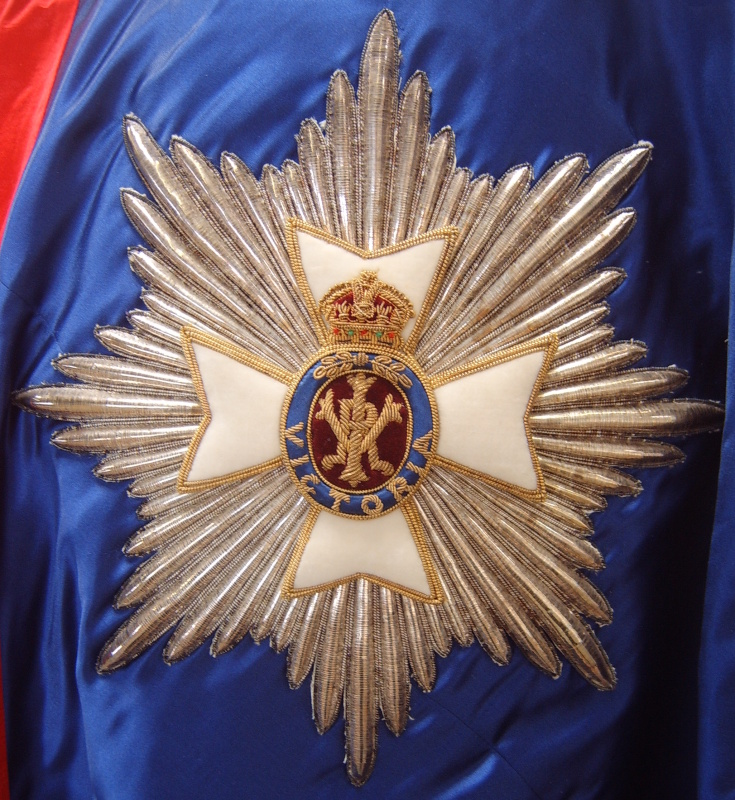
The star of a Knight or Dame Grand Cross of the Royal Victorian Order, in its embroidered form on a mantle

The Royal Victorian Order is an order of knighthood awarded by the sovereign of the United Kingdom and several Commonwealth realms. It is granted personally by the monarch and recognises personal service to the monarchy, the Royal Household, royal family members, and the organisation of important royal events. The order was officially created and instituted on 23 April 1896 by letters patent under the Great Seal of the Realm by Queen Victoria. It was instituted with five grades, the two highest of which were Knight Grand Cross (GCVO) and Knight Commander (KCVO), which conferred the status of knighthood on holders (apart from foreigners, who typically received honorary awards not entitling them to the style of a knight). Women were not admitted until Edward VIII altered the statutes of the order in 1936; those receiving the highest two awards were styled dames and those grades, when conferred on women, are Dame Grand Cross and Dame Commander (DCVO).

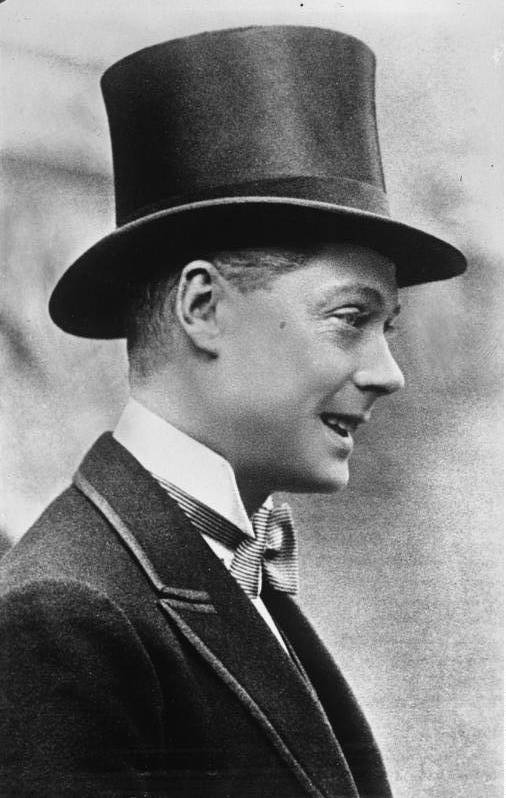
King Edward VIII (reigned 1936)

No limit was placed on the number of appointments which could be made. King Edward VIII appointed 5 Knights Grand Cross, 1 Dame Grand Cross and 2 Knights Commander, between his accession to the throne on 20 January 1936 and his abdication on 11 December 1936. (Note: A complete list of those receiving substantive (i.e. non-honorary) appointments to the GCVO during King Edward VII's reign may be found at Galloway, 1996, p. 112. Records of honorary appointments were not printed in the London Gazette after 1 July 1911.) He appointed his mother, Queen Mary, a Dame Grand Cross; she was the only royal to receive either of the two highest grades under Edward VIII and was also the first woman appointed in the order's history. Of the Knights Grand Cross, all but one were members of the Royal Household, two of whom were recognised for their service to King George V; the other was the Lord Mayor of London, Lord Wakefield. The two Knights Commander were officers in the army. All of the appointments were made to celebrate the King's Birthday, except for Sir Philip Hunloke, who received the GCVO on 1 February 1937, back-dated to 15 July 1936.

== Knights and Dames Grand Cross appointed by Edward VIII ==
The list below is ordered by date of appointment. Full names, styles, ranks and titles are given where applicable, as correct at the time of appointment to the order. Branch of service or regiment details are given in parentheses to distinguish them from offices. The offices listed are those given in the official notice, printed in the London Gazette. Where applicable, the occasion is given that was listed either with the notices or in published material elsewhere, in which case that material is cited.

Name	Date of appointment	Notes	Ref
Charles Wakefield, 1st Viscount Wakefield	23 June 1936	Donor of property at Windsor for transfer to the Dean and Chapter of St George's. Appointed on the occasion of the King's birthday.	
Lieutenant Colonel Sir Malcolm Murray	23 June 1936	Comptroller and Equerry to the Duke of Connaught; Deputy Ranger, Windsor Great Park. Appointed on the occasion of the King's birthday.	
Sir Richard Cruise	23 June 1936	Surgeon-oculist to Queen Mary. Appointed on the occasion of the King's birthday.	
Sir Bernard Halsey-Bircham	23 June 1936	Solicitor to George V. Appointed on the occasion of the King's birthday.	
Queen Mary	23 June 1936	Appointed on the occasion of the King's birthday.	
Major Sir Philip Hunloke	15 July 1936	Extra Groom in Waiting to the King. His appointment was made on 1 February 1937 and back-dated to 15 July 1936.	

== Knights Commander appointed by Edward VIII ==
The list below is ordered by date of appointment. Full names, styles, ranks and titles are given where applicable, as correct at the time of appointment to the order. Branch of service or regiment details are given in parentheses to distinguish them from offices. The offices listed are those given in the official notice, printed in the London Gazette. Where applicable, the occasion is given that was listed either with the notices or in published material elsewhere, in which case that material is cited.

Name	Date of appointment	Notes	Ref
Brigadier-General Archibald Home	23 June 1936	Standard Bearer, Honourable Corps of Gentleman-at-Arms. Appointed on the occasion of the King's birthday.	
Colonel Frank Watney	23 June 1936	Chairman of the Officers' Association. Appointed on the occasion of the King's birthday.	
