= List of knights and dames grand cross of the Royal Victorian Order appointed by George VI =

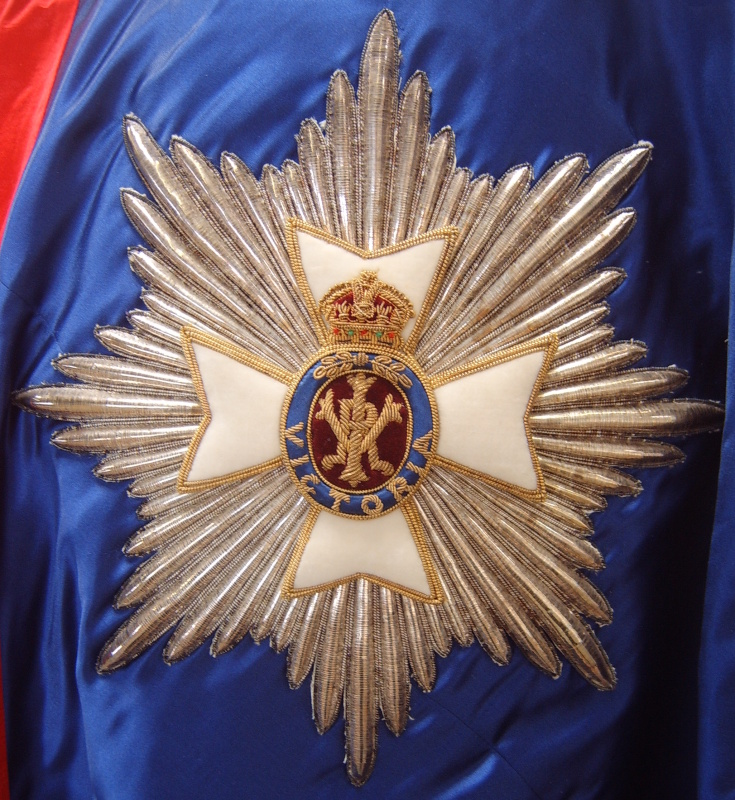
The star of a Knight or Dame Grand Cross of the Royal Victorian Order

The Royal Victorian Order is an order of knighthood awarded by the sovereign of the United Kingdom and several Commonwealth realms. It is granted personally by the monarch and recognises personal service to the monarchy, the Royal Household, royal family members, and the organisation of important royal events. The order was officially created and instituted on 23 April 1896 by letters patent under the Great Seal of the Realm by Queen Victoria. It was instituted with five grades, the two highest of which were Knight Grand Cross (GCVO) and Knight Commander (KCVO), which conferred the status of knighthood on holders (apart from foreigners, who typically received honorary awards not entitling them to the style of a knight). Women were not admitted until Edward VIII altered the statutes of the order in 1936; those receiving the highest two awards were styled dames and those grades, when conferred on women, are Dame Grand Cross and Dame Commander (DCVO).

No limit was placed on the number of appointments which could be made. King George VI appointed 43 Knights Grand Cross and 12 Dames Grand Cross between his accession to the throne on 11 December 1936 and his death on 6 February 1952.

== Knights and dames grand cross appointed by George VI ==
The list below is ordered by date of appointment. Full names, styles, ranks and titles are given where applicable, as correct at the time of appointment to the order. Branch of service or regiment details are given in parentheses to distinguish them from offices. The offices listed are those given in the official notice, printed in the London Gazette. Where applicable, the occasion is given that was listed either with the notices or in published material elsewhere, in which case that material is cited.

Name	Date	Refs.
Queen Elizabeth	1 February 1937	
Commander Lord Louis Francis Albert Victor Nicholas Mountbatten	1 February 1937	
Hugh Pattison Macmillan, Baron Macmillan	1 February 1937	
Maud, Queen of Norway	11 May 1937	
Mary, Princess Royal	11 May 1937	
Princess Louise, Duchess of Argyll	11 May 1937	
Princess Beatrice	11 May 1937	
Evelyn Emily Mary Cavendish, Duchess of Devonshire	11 May 1937	
Nina Cecilia Bowes-Lyon, Countess of Strathmore and Kinghorne	11 May 1937	
Gilbert Heathcote-Drummond-Willoughby, 2nd Earl of Ancaster	11 May 1937	
Field Marshal Sir William Riddell Birdwood, 1st Baronet	11 May 1937	
Lieutenant-General Sir George Sidney Clive	11 May 1937	
Air Vice-Marshal Sir Philip Woolcott Game	11 May 1937	
Major Sir Alexander Henry Louis Hardinge	11 May 1937	
The Most Rev. & Rt Hon. Cosmo Gordon Lang	11 May 1937	
Sir John Allsebrook Simon	11 May 1937	
Admiral Sir Roger Roland Charles Backhouse	20 May 1937	
Admiral Sir Alfred Dudley Pickman Rogers Pound	20 May 1937	
Air Chief Marshal Sir Hugh Caswall Tremenheere Dowding	26 June 1937	
Helen Magdalen Percy, Duchess of Northumberland	1 January 1938	
Lieutenant-Colonel David Lyulph Gore Wolseley Ogilvy, 12th Earl of Airlie	1 January 1938	
Thomas Jeeves Horder, 1st Baron Horder	1 January 1938	
Vice-Admiral the Hon. Sir Alexander Robert Maule Ramsay	6 July 1938	
Sir George Frankenstein	25 July 1938	
George Charles Bingham, 5th Earl of Lucan	2 January 1939	
Sir John Charles Walsham Reith	2 January 1939	
Sir Eric Clare Edmund Phipps	21 March 1939	
George Herbert Hyde Villiers, 6th Earl of Clarendon	8 June 1939	
Sir John Weir	8 June 1939	
John Buchan, 1st Baron Tweedsmuir	15 June 1939	
Sir Smith Hill Child, 2nd Baronet	30 June 1941	
The Hon. Sir Arthur Stanley	1 January 1944	
Rear-Admiral Sir Basil Vernon Brooke	2 June 1945	
Bernard Marmaduke Fitzalan-Howard, 16th Duke of Norfolk	1 January 1946	
Douglas Douglas-Hamilton, 14th Duke of Hamilton and Brandon	1 January 1946	
Lieutenant-General Sir Hari Singh, Maharaja of Jammu and Kashmir	1 January 1946	
Margaret Russell, Dowager Baroness Ampthill	13 June 1946	
Sir Edward Ettingdene Bridges	13 June 1946	
Sir Alan Frederick Lascelles	12 June 1947	
Admiral Sir Dudley Burton Napier North	12 June 1947	
The Duchess of Gloucester	1 January 1948	
The Duchess of Kent	1 January 1948	
Princess Alice, Countess of Athlone	1 January 1948	
Sir Godfrey John Vignoles Thomas, 10th Baronet	1 January 1948	
Sir James Ulick Francis Canning Alexander	10 June 1948	
Lieutenant-Colonel the Hon. Sir Piers Walter Legh	10 June 1948	
Major-General Sir Harold Augustus Wernher, 3rd Baronet	1 January 1949	
Sir Maurice Alan Cassidy	3 May 1949	
Brigadier Sir Thomas Peel Dunhill	3 May 1949	
Sir Morton Smart	3 May 1949	
Captain Lord Claud Nigel Hamilton	9 June 1949	
Boyd Merriman, 1st Baron Merriman	2 January 1950	
Sir Henry Davies Foster MacGeagh	2 January 1950	
Sir Oliver Charles Harvey	8 June 1950	
Sir John Berkeley Monck	21 July 1950	

Source: Galloway et al., 1996, p. 112
