= List of knights and dames grand cross of the Royal Victorian Order appointed by Elizabeth II (1952–1977) =

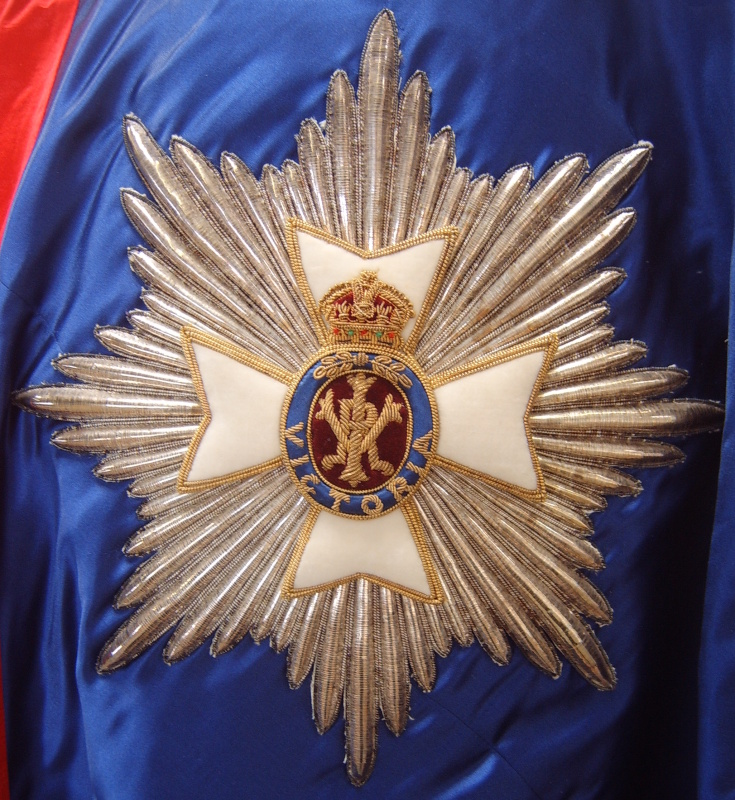
The star of a Knight or Dame Grand Cross of the Royal Victorian Order

The Royal Victorian Order is an order of knighthood awarded by the sovereign of the United Kingdom and several Commonwealth realms. It is granted personally by the monarch and recognises personal service to the monarchy, the Royal Household, royal family members, and the organisation of important royal events. The order was officially created and instituted on 23 April 1896 by letters patent under the Great Seal of the Realm by Queen Victoria. It was instituted with five grades, the two highest of which were Knight Grand Cross (GCVO) and Knight Commander (KCVO), which conferred the status of knighthood on holders (apart from foreigners, who typically received honorary awards not entitling them to the style of a knight). Women were not admitted until Edward VIII altered the statutes of the order in 1936; those receiving the highest two awards were styled dames and those grades, when conferred on women, are Dame Grand Cross and Dame Commander (DCVO).

No limit was placed on the number of appointments which could be made. Queen Elizabeth II appointed 79 Knights and 8 Dames Grand Cross between her accession to the throne on 6 February 1952 and the end of her Silver Jubilee year (1977).

== Knights and dames grand cross appointed by Elizabeth II ==
The list below is ordered by date of appointment. Full names, styles, ranks and titles are given where applicable, as correct at the time of appointment to the order. Branch of service or regiment details are given in parentheses to distinguish them from offices. The offices listed are those given in the official notice, printed in the London Gazette. Where applicable, the occasion is given that was listed either with the notices or in published material elsewhere, in which case that material is cited.

Name	Date of appointment	Notes	Gazette
Sir Terence Edmund Gascoigne Nugent, KCVO, MC	5 June 1952	Comptroller, Lord Chamberlain's Office and Extra Equerry to the Queen	
Rose Leveson-Gower, Countess Granville, DCVO	1 January 1953		
Princess Margaret, CI	1 June 1953		
Princess Marie Louise, CI, GBE	1 June 1953		
Mabell Frances Elizabeth Ogilvy, Dowager Countess of Airlie, GBE	1 June 1953	Lady of the Bedchamber to Queen Mary	
Field Marshal Alan Francis Brooke, 1st Viscount Alanbrooke, KG, GCB, OM, DSO	1 June 1953	Lord High Constable and Field Marshal commanding Coronation Troops	
Geoffrey Francis Fisher	1 June 1953	Archbishop of Canterbury	
George Horatio Charles Cholmondeley, 5th Marquess of Cholmondeley	1 June 1953	Lord Great Chamberlain	
Admiral Sir John Hereward Edelsten, GCB, CBE	1 June 1953	Commander-in-Chief, Portsmouth, and First and Principal Naval Aide-de-Camp	
Air Chief Marshal Sir William Elliot, KCB, KBE, DFC	1 June 1953	Air Aide-de-Camp	
Sir David Patrick Maxwell Fyfe	1 June 1953	Secretary of State, Home Department	
Colonel Sir Dermot McMorrough Kavanagh, KCVO	1 June 1953	Crown Equerry	
Major Sir Arthur Horace Penn, KCVO, MC	1 June 1953	Treasurer to Queen Elizabeth the Queen Mother	
Lawrence Roger Lumley, 11th Earl of Scarborough, KG, PC, GCSI, GCIE, TD	1 June 1953	Lord Chamberlain to the Queen and Chancellor of the Royal Victorian Order	
Sir Harold Richard Scott, KCB, KBE	1 June 1953	Commissioner of Police of the Metropolis	
Sir Harold George Campbell, KCVO, DSO	16 November 1953	Equerry and Groom of the Robes to the Queen	
Alfred Webb-Johnson, 1st Baron Webb-Johnson, KCVO, CBE, DSO, TD	1 January 1954	Surgeon to Queen Mary	
Sir Charles Wolloughby Moke Norrie, GCMG, CB, DSO, MC	15 January 1954	Governor-General and Commander in Chief of New Zealand, appointed on the occasion of the Queen's visit to New Zealand	
Sir William Joseph Slim, GCB, GCMG, GBE, DSO, MC	16 February 1954	Governor-General and Commander in Chief of Australia, appointed on the occasion of the Queen's visit to Australia	
Herwald Ramsbotham, 1st Viscount Soulbury, PC, GCMG, OBE, MC	20 April 1954	Governor-General and Commander in Chief of Ceylon, appointed on the occasion of the Queen's visit to Ceylon	
Cyril Forster Garbett	6 February 1955	Archbishop of York	
Mary Cavendish, Dowager Duchess of Devonshire	9 June 1955	Mistress of the Robes to the Queen	
Sir Horace Evans	9 June 1955	Physician to the Queen and to Queen Elizabeth the Queen Mother	
Sir James Wilson Robertson, KCMG, KBE	3 February 1956	Governor-General and Commander-in-Chief of the Federation of Nigeria, appointed on the occasion of the Queen's visit	
Sir Harold Brewer Hartley, KCVO, CBE, MC	1 January 1957	For personal services to the Duke of Edinburgh	
Sir Charles Alfred Howard, KCVO, DSO	1 January 1957	Serjeant-at-Arms attending the Speaker, House of Commons	
Sir Ernest Henry Pooley, Bt, KCVO	1 January 1957	Chairman of the Management Committee, King Edward VII's Hospital Fund	
Sir Hubert Miles Gladwyn Jebb, GCMG, CB	10 April 1957	Ambassador to France, appointed on the occasion of the Queen's visit to France	
Sir William Stewart Duke-Elder, KCVO	1 January 1958	Surgeon-Oculist to the Queen	
Sir Edward Michael Conolly Abel Smith, KCVO, CB	1 January 1958	Flag Officer, Royal Yachts and Extra Equerry to the Queen	
Sir Owen Frederick Morshead, KCB, KCVO, DSO, MC	12 June 1958	Librarian, Windsor Castle and Assistant Keeper of the Queen's Archives	
Sir Frederick Albert Minter, KCVO	1 January 1959	For services to the Queen's Chapel of the Savoy	
Sir Frederick Arthur Montague Browning, KCVO, KBE, CB, DSO	14 May 1959	Treasurer to the Duke of Edinburgh	
Princess Alexandra of Kent	25 December 1960		
Prince Edward, Duke of Kent	25 December 1960		
Sir Henry Ashley Clarke, KCMG	4 May 1961	Ambassador to Italy, appointed on the occasion of the Queen's visit to Italy	
Sir Harold Anthony Caccia, GCMG, KCVO	31 August 1961	Ambassador to the United States of America	
Sir Maurice Henry Dorman, GCMG	1 December 1961	Governor-General of Sierra Leone, appointed on the occasion of the Queen's visit	
Sir Arthur Guy Salisbury-Jones, KCVO, CMG, CBE, MC	20 December 1961	Marshal of the Diplomatic Corps	
Sir Michael Edward Adeane, KCB, KCVO	1 March 1962	Private Secretary and Extra Equerry to the Queen	
John Scott, 4th Earl of Eldon, KCVO	1 January 1963	Lord in Waiting to the Queen	
Sir Norman Wilmshurst Gwatkin, KCVO, DSO	1 January 1963	Equerry and Comptroller of the Lord Chamberlain's Office	
Cameron Fromanteel Cobbold, 1st Baron Cobbold, PC	29 January 1963	Lord Chamberlain to the Queen and Chancellor of the Royal Victorian Order	
Sir Bernard Edward Fergusson, GCMG, DSO, OBE	11 February 1963	Governor-General of New Zealand, appointed on the occasion of the Queen's visit to New Zealand	
William Philip Sidney, 1st Viscount De L'Isle, VC, GCMG, PC	14 March 1963	Governor-General of Australia, appointed on the occasion of the Queen's visit to Australia	
Walter Turner Monckton, 1st Viscount Monckton of Brenchley, PC, KCMG, KCVO, MC	1 January 1964	For personal services	
Sir Frank Kenyon Roberts, GCMG	28 May 1965	Ambassador to the Federal Republic of Germany, appointed on the occasion of the Queen's state visit to the Federal Republic of Germany	
Sir Henry Charles Loyd, KCB, KCVO, DSO, MC	12 June 1965	Colonel of the Coldstream Guards	
Sir Solomon Hochoy, GCMG, OBE	10 February 1966	Governor-General of Trinidad and Tobago, appointed on the occasion of the Queen's visit to the Caribbean	
Sir Clifford Clarence Campbell, GCMG	4 March 1966	Governor-General of Jamaica, appointed on the occasion of the Queen's visit to the Caribbean	
Sir Roderick Edward Barclay, KCMG, KCVO	11 May 1966	Ambassador to Belgium, appointed on the occasion of the Queen's visit to Belgium	
Sir James Newton Rodney Moore, KCB, KCVO, CBE, DSO	11 August 1966	Defence Services Secretary	
Charles Laing Warr, KCVO	1 January 1967	Dean of the Chapel Royal in Scotland and Dean of the Order of the Thistle	
Sir Thomas Innes of Learney, KCVO	10 June 1967	Lord Lyon King of Arms and Secretary to the Order of the Thistle	
Sir Edward Hedley Fielden, KCVO, CB, DFC, AFC	8 June 1968	Senior Air Equerry to the Queen	
Sir John Wriothesley Russell, KCVO, CMG	9 November 1968	Ambassador to Brazil, appointed on the occasion of the Queen's state visit to Brazil	
Charles George Vivian Tryon, 2nd Baron Tryon, KCB, KCVO, DSO	1 January 1969	Keeper of the Privy Purse, Treasurer to The Queen and Secretary to the Royal Victorian Order	
Anthony Charles Robert Armstrong-Jones, 1st Earl of Snowdon	7 July 1969	On the occasion of the investiture of the Prince of Wales	
Hon. Sir Humphrey Vicary Gibbs, KCMG, KCVO, OBE	9 July 1969	Governor of Southern Rhodesia	
Sir Arthur Espie Porritt, Bt, GCMG, KCVO, CBE	21 March 1970	Governor-General of New Zealand, appointed on the occasion of the Queen's visit to New Zealand	
Sir Paul Meernaa Caedwalla Hasluck, GCMG	27 April 1970	Governor-General of Australia, appointed on the occasion of the Queen's visit to Australia	
Sir Christopher Douglas Bonham-Carter, KCVO, CB	26 November 1970	Treasurer to the Duke of Edinburgh	
Charles Hector Fitzroy Maclean, Baron Maclean, PC, KT, KBE	30 November 1971	Lord Chamberlain	
David Charles Cairns, 5th Earl Cairns, KCVO, CB	2 February 1972	Marshal of the Diplomatic Corps	
Sir Arthur Leonard Williams, GCMG	24 March 1972	Governor-General of Mauritius, appointed on the occasions of the Queen's visit	
Sir Arthur Christopher John Soames, GCMG, CBE	19 March 1972	Ambassador to France, appointed on the occasion of the Queen's state visit to France	
Charles John Lyttelton, 10th Viscount Cobham, KG, PC, GCMG, TD	3 June 1972	Lord Steward to the Royal Household	
Ralph Francis Alnwick Grey, Baron Grey of Naunton, GCMG, KCVO, OBE	2 June 1973	Governor of Northern Ireland	
Sir Ronald Bodley-Scott, KCVO	9 November 1973	Physician to the Queen	
Sir Henry Laurence Lindo, CMG	12 December 1973	High Commissioner for Jamaica and Doyen of the Diplomatic Corps	
Sir John Wheeler Wheeler-Bennett, KCVO, CMG, OBE	1 January 1974	Historical Advisor, The Queen's Archives	
Prince Richard of Gloucester	1 January 1974		
Sir Edward Denis Blundell, GCMG, KBE	7 February 1974	Governor-General of New Zealand, appointed on the occasion of the Queen's visit to New Zealand	
Princess Anne	15 August 1974		
Sir Allan Henry Shafto Adair, Bt, KCVO, CB, DSO, MC	19 December 1974	Colonel of the Grenadier Guards	
Sir Arleigh Winston Scott, GCMG	18 February 1975	Governor-General of Barbados, appointed on the occasion of the Queen's visit	
Hon. Sir Milo Boughton Butler, GCMB	20 February 1975	Governor-General of the Bahamas, appointed on the occasion of the Queen's visit	
Sir Frederick Archibald Warner, KCMG	7 May 1975	Ambassador to Japan, appointed on the occasion of the Queen's state visit	
Sir Martin Michael Charles Charteris, KCB, KCVO, OBE	1 January 1976	Private Secretary to the Queen	
Hon. Sir Peter Edward Ramsbotham, KCMG	11 July 1976	Ambassador to the United States of America, appointed on the occasion of the Queen's visit to the United States of America	
Geoffrey Noel Waldegrave, 12th Earl Waldegrave, KG, TD	17 December 1976	Lord Warden of the Stannaries, Duchy of Cornwall	
Sir Seymour John Louis Egerton, KCVO	3 February 1977	Chairman of Coutts Bank	
Ratu Sir George Kadavulevu Cakobau, GCMG, OBE	16 February 1977	Governor-General of Fiji, appointed on the occasion of the Queen's Silver Jubilee visit	
Sir John Robert Kerr, AK, GCMG	7 March 1977	Governor-General of Australia, appointed on the occasion of the Queen's Silver Jubilee visit	
Katherine, Duchess of Kent	9 June 1977		
George Hugh Cholmondeley, 6th Marquess of Cholmondeley, MC	11 June 1977	Lord Great Chamberlain	
Sir Deighton Harcourt Lisle Ward, GCMG	1 November 1977	Governor-General of Barbados. appointed on the occasion of the Queen's Silver Jubilee visit	

Source: Galloway et al. 1996, pp. 113–114, 116
