= List of knights and dames grand cross of the Royal Victorian Order appointed by Elizabeth II (1978–2002) =

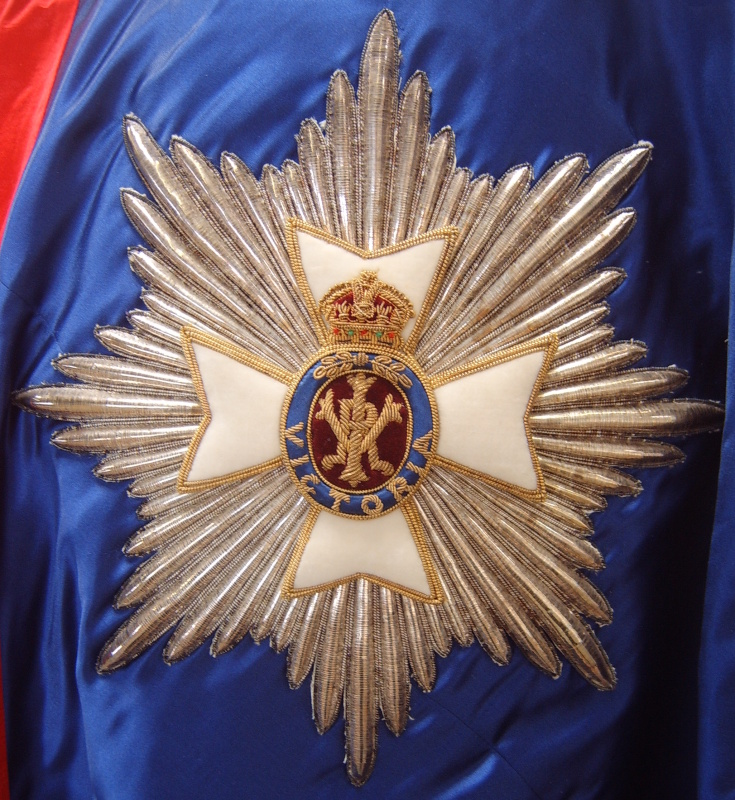
The star of a Knight or Dame Grand Cross of the Royal Victorian Order

The Royal Victorian Order is an order of knighthood awarded by the sovereign of the United Kingdom and several Commonwealth realms. It is granted personally by the monarch and recognises personal service to the monarchy, the Royal Household, royal family members, and the organisation of important royal events. The order was officially created and instituted on 23 April 1896 by letters patent under the Great Seal of the Realm by Queen Victoria. It was instituted with five grades, the two highest of which were Knight Grand Cross (GCVO) and Knight Commander (KCVO), which conferred the status of knighthood on holders (apart from foreigners, who typically received honorary awards not entitling them to the style of a knight). Women were not admitted until Edward VIII altered the statutes of the order in 1936; those receiving the highest two awards were styled dames and those grades, when conferred on women, are Dame Grand Cross and Dame Commander (DCVO).

No limit was placed on the number of appointments which could be made. Queen Elizabeth II appointed 58 Knights and 6 Dames Grand Cross between 1978 and the end of her Golden Jubilee year (2002).

== Knights and dames grand cross appointed by Elizabeth II ==
The list below is ordered by date of appointment. Full names, styles, ranks and titles are given where applicable, as correct at the time of appointment to the order. Branch of service or regiment details are given in parentheses to distinguish them from offices. Where applicable, the occasion is given that was listed either with the notices or in published material elsewhere, in which case that material is cited.

| Name | Date | Notes | Ref. |
|---|---|---|---|
| Sir John Oliver Wright, KCMG, DSC | 26 May 1978 | Ambassador in Bonn, appointed on the occasion of the Queen's visit to Germany | |
| The Earl of Dalhousie, KT, GBE, MC | 30 December 1978 | Lord Chamberlain to the Queen Mother | |
| Sir James Rennie Maudslay, KCB, KCVO, MBE | 31 December 1979 | Keeper of the Privy Purse and Treasurer to the Queen | |
| Sir Zelman Cowen, GCMG | 27 May 1980 | Governor-General of Australia. Appointed on the occasion of the Queen's visit to Australia | |
| Ann Fortune FitzRoy, Duchess of Grafton, DCVO | 14 June 1980 | Mistress of the Robes to the Queen | |
| Sir Martin John Gilliat, KCVO, MBE | 31 December 1980 | Private Secretary and Equerry to the Queen Mother | |
| Sir Eric Charles William Mackenzie Penn, KCVO, OBE, MC | 31 December 1980 | Comptroller, Lord Chamberlain's Office | |
| The Duke of Northumberland, KG, PC, TD | 13 June 1981 | Lord Steward | |
| Sir David Stuart Beattie, GCMG | 15 October 1981 | Governor-General of New Zealand, appointed on the occasion of the Queen's visit | |
| Lord Michael Fitzalan-Howard, KCVO, CB, CBE, MC | 22 December 1981 | Marshal of the Diplomatic Corps | |
| Mary Kathleen Hamilton, Dowager Duchess of Abercorn, DCVO | 12 June 1982 | Mistress of the Robes to the Queen Mother | |
| Sir Ninian Martin Stephen, GCMG, KBE | 13 October 1982 | Governor-General of Australia, appointed on the occasion of the Queen's visit to Australia | |
| Sir Tore Lokoloko, GCMG, OBE | 14 October 1982 | Governor-General of Papua New Guinea, appointed on the occasion of the Queen's visit to Papua New Guinea | |
| Sir Baddeley Devesi, GCMG | 18 October 1982 | Governor-General of the Solomon Islands, appointed on the occasion of the Queen's visit to the Solomon Islands | |
| Sir Fiatau Penitala Teo, GCMG, ISO, MBE | 27 October 1982 | Governor-General of Tuvalu, appointed on the occasion of the Queen's visit to Tuvalu | |
| Sir Philip Brian Cecil Moore, KCB, KCVO, CMG | 31 December 1982 | Private Secretary to the Queen | |
| Sir Florizel Augustus Glasspole, GCMG | 16 February 1983 | Governor-General of Jamaica, appointed on the occasion of the Queen's visit to Jamaica | |
| The Earl of Airlie | 29 November 1984 | Lord Chamberlain | |
| Sir Robert Christopher Mackworth-Young, KCVO | 7 February 1985 | Librarian and Assistant Keeper of the Queen's Archives | |
| Dame Elmira Minita Gordon, GCMG | 11 October 1985 | Appointed on the occasion of the Queen's visit to the Caribbean | |
| Sir Gerald Christopher Cash, GCMG, KCVO, OBE | 18 October 1985 | Appointed on the occasion of the Queen's visit to the Caribbean | |
| Sir Clement Athelston Arrindell, GCMG | 23 October 1985 | Appointed on the occasion of the Queen's visit to the Caribbean | |
| Sir Wilfred Ebenezer Jacobs, GCMG, KCVO, OBE, QC | 24 October 1985 | Appointed on the occasion of the Queen's visit to the Caribbean | |
| Sir Allen Montgomery Lewis, GCMG, QC | 26 October 1985 | Appointed on the occasion of the Queen's visit to the Caribbean | |
| Sir Joseph Lambert Eustace, GCMG | 27 October 1985 | Appointed on the occasion of the Queen's visit to the Caribbean | |
| Sir Hugh Worrell Springer, GCMG, CBE | 29 October 1985 | Appointed on the occasion of the Queen's visit to the Caribbean | |
| Sir Paul Scoon, GCMG, OBE | 31 October 1985 | Appointed on the occasion of the Queen's visit to the Caribbean | |
| The Duke of Norfolk, KG, CB, CBE, MC | 31 December 1985 | Earl Marshal | |
| Sir Paul Alfred Reeves, GCMG | 1 March 1986 | Governor-General of New Zealand, appointed on the occasion of the Queen's visit | |
| Sir Edward Youde, GCMG, MBE | 22 October 1986 | Governor of Hong Kong, appointed on the occasion of the Queen's visit | |
| The Baron Hamilton of Dalzell, KCVO, MC | 31 December 1986 | Lord in Waiting to the Queen | |
| Sir John Mansel Miller, KCVO, DSO, MC | 13 June 1987 | Crown Equerry | |
| Sir John Frederick Dame Johnston, KCVO, MC | 13 June 1987 | Comptroller, Lord Chamberlain's Office | |
| Sir John Grandy, GCB, KBE, DSO | 31 December 1987 | Constable and Governor of Windsor Castle | |
| Sir William Frederick Payne Heseltine, KCB, KCVO, AC | 11 June 1988 | Private Secretary to the Queen | |
| Sir Oliver Nicholas Millar, KCVO | 27 July 1988 | Surveyor of the Queen's Pictures | |
| Birgitte, Duchess of Gloucester | 23 June 1989 | | |
| Patricia Smith, Viscountess Hambleden, DCVO | 16 June 1990 | Lady of the Bedchamber to the Queen Mother, appointed on the occasion of the Queen Mother's 90th birthday | |
| Sir Walter Arthur George Burns, KCVO, CB, DSO, OBE, MC | 31 December 1990 | Colonel of the Coldstream Guards | |
| Sir Antony Arthur Acland, GCMG, KCVO | 17 May 1991 | Ambassador in Washington, appointed on the occasion of the Queen's visit to the United States | |
| The Earl of Westmorland, KCVO | 29 October 1991 | Master of the Horse and Permanent Lord in Waiting | |
| Major Sir Ralph Hugo Anstruther, Bt, KCVO, MC | 31 December 1991 | Treasurer and Equerry to the Queen Mother | |
| Sir Ewen Alastair John Fergusson, KCMG | 10 June 1992 | Ambassador in Paris, appointed on the occasion of the Queen's visit to France | |
| Sir Paul Woollven Greening, KCVO | 9 September 1992 | Master of the Household | |
| Sir Christopher Leslie George Mallaby, KCMG | 23 October 1992 | Ambassadar in Paris | |
| Sir Howard Felix Hanlan Cooke, ON, GCMG, CD | 2 March 1994 | Governor-General of Jamaica | |
| Sir Clifford Darling | 7 March 1994 | Governor-General of the Bahamas | |
| The Baron Waddington | 10 March 1994 | Governor of Bermuda | |
| The Viscount Ridley, KG, TD | 11 June 1994 | Lord Lieutenant of Northumberland | |
| Sir Brian James Proetel Fall, KCMG | 18 October 1994 | Ambassador in Moscow, appointed on the occasion of the Queen's visit to Russia | |
| Sir Charles Mathew Farrer, KCVO | 1 December 1994 | Partner in Farrer and Co., solicitors | |
| Dame Catherine Anne Tizard, GCMG, DBE | 1 November 1995 | Governor-General of New Zealand | |
| Sir Geoffrey de Bellaigue, KCVO | 5 March 1996 | Director of the Royal Collection and Surveyor of the Queen's Works of Art | |
| Sir Shane Gabriel Basil Blewitt, KCVO | 15 June 1996 | Keeper of the Privy Purse | |
| Sir Robert Fellowes, KCB, KCVO | 15 June 1996 | Private Secretary to the Queen | |
| Ralph Thomas Campion George Sherman Stonor, Baron Camoys | 20 February 1998 | Lord Chamberlain | |
| Sir Edward William Spencer Ford, KCB, KCVO, ERD | 13 June 1998 | Secretary and Registrar of the Order of Merit | |
| Savile William Francis Crossley, Lord Somerleyton, KCVO | 31 December 1998 | Master of the Horse | |
| Major-General Sir Simon Christie Cooper, KCVO | 3 August 2000 | Master of the Household | |
| Richard Napier, Baron Luce, DL | 8 October 2000 | Lord Chamberlain to the Queen | |
| Sir Brian Henry McGrath, KCVO | 30 December 2000 | Treasurer to the Duke of Edinburgh | |
| Major Sir Hew Fleetwood Hamilton-Dalrymple, Bt, KCVO | 16 June 2001 | Captain-General, The Queen's Body Guard for Scotland, Royal Company of Archers, and Gold Stick for Scotland | |
| Robert Alexander Lindsay, Earl of Crawford and Balcarres, KT | 5 August 2002 | Lord Chamberlain to the Queen Mother, appointed on the death of the Queen Mother | |
| Jeffrey Maurice Sterling, Baron Sterling of Plaistow, CBE | 5 August 2002 | Appointed on the occasion of the Queen's Golden Jubilee | |

Source: Galloway et al. 1996, pp. 114–116
