= 1911 in the United Kingdom =

Events from the year 1911 in the United Kingdom. This year saw the coronation of King George V. 1911 was also a census year.

== Incumbents ==
- Monarch – George V
- Prime Minister – H. H. Asquith (Liberal)

== Events ==
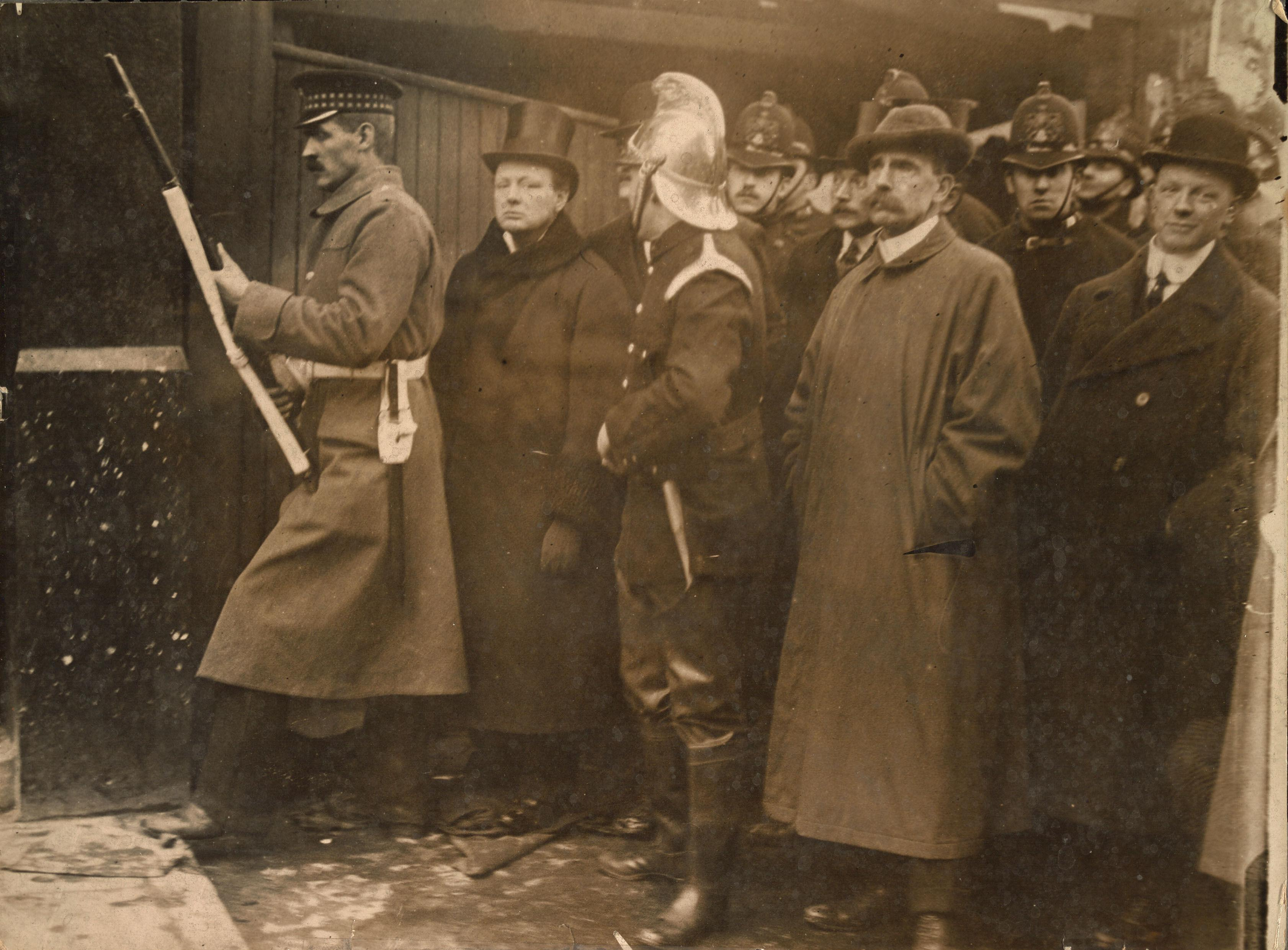
3 January – Siege of Sidney Street

- 3 January – in London, in what becomes known as the Siege of Sidney Street, the Metropolitan Police and the Scots Guards engage in a shootout with a criminal gang of Latvian anarchists holed up in a building in the East End. The Home Secretary, Winston Churchill, attends in person.
- March–April – eleven thousand workers at the Singer Manufacturing Co. sewing machine factory on Clydebank in Scotland go on strike in solidarity with twelve female colleagues protesting against work process reorganisation. Four hundred alleged ringleaders are dismissed.
- 2 April – the 1911 census is taken. One out of every seven employed persons is a domestic servant. Suffragette Emily Davison hides in a cupboard in the crypt of the Palace of Westminster so that she can legitimately be recorded as resident on census night at the House of Commons; several thousand women evade being recorded in the census as a protest against the lack of women's suffrage.
- 4 April – work begins on construction of Castle Drogo, Devon, to the design of Edwin Lutyens.
- May–September – hottest British summer on record.
- 12 May – Festival of Empire opens at The Crystal Palace, London, to celebrate the Coronation.
- 31 May – launching of the ocean liner RMS Titanic in Belfast. Her sister RMS Olympic sails for Liverpool the same day to take up transatlantic service.
- 14 June – Liverpool general transport strike begins.
- 22 June
  - Coronation of George V and Queen Mary at Westminster Abbey, London.
  - Completion of the Royal Liver Building, Liverpool, is marked by starting the clocks in its towers at the same moment as the Coronation and in New York Harbor RMS Olympic is decorated for the occasion.
- July–September – severe heat wave and associated drought.
- 13 July – the future Edward VIII is invested as Prince of Wales in a ceremony at Carnarvon Castle devised by David Lloyd George.
- 14 July – new buildings of the University College of North Wales, Bangor, opened.
- 22 July–5 August – first Daily Mail Circuit of Britain air race.
- 9 August – Raunds, Northamptonshire, records a temperature of 98 °F (36.7 °C), the highest UK temperature until 1990.
- 10 August – British MPs vote to receive salaries for the first time.
- 13 August – Liverpool general transport strike: "Bloody Sunday" – the centre of Liverpool is rocked by violence when a meeting of striking transport workers is broken up by police and soldiers and a number of policemen and many strikers are seriously injured.
- 15 August – Liverpool general transport strike: two men are shot dead on Liverpool's Vauxhall Road by mounted troops during continued unrest following "Bloody Sunday".
- 17–20 August – national railway workers' strike.
- 18 August – the Parliament Act removes the House of Lords' power regarding budgets and restricts their power over other bills to a two-year suspensive veto.
- 19 August – Llanelli riots: During demonstrations in support of the national railway strike, two men are shot dead by soldiers of the Worcestershire Regiment in Llanelli. Magistrates' homes are attacked and four more of the crowd are killed outright when explosive material stored on railway property ignites.
- 22 August – the Official Secrets Act 1911 comes into effect.
- 9–26 September – the world's first scheduled airmail post service is flown between Hendon, North London, and Windsor, Berkshire.
- 20 September – the new liner RMS Olympic, sister ship to the Titanic, collides with Royal Navy cruiser HMS Hawke off Southampton; there is no loss of life or serious injury.
- 24 September – Britain's first rigid airship, HMA No. 1 ("Mayfly"), built for the Royal Navy, breaks in half and is wrecked during a pre-commissioning ground test at her builders, Vickers of Barrow-in-Furness.
- 4 October – the first electric escalators to be introduced to the public, at Earl's Court tube station in London.
- 6 October – the British Seafarers' Union is formed in Southampton.
- 28 October – the respective dioceses are elevated to the status of Roman Catholic Archdiocese of Birmingham and of Liverpool.
- November – Virginia Stephen begins to share her brother Adrian Stephen's London house at 38 Brunswick Square with other members of the Bloomsbury Group: Leonard Woolf (her future husband), John Maynard Keynes and Duncan Grant.
- 8 November – the first rugby league football Test of the 1911–12 Kangaroo tour of Great Britain is played between Australasia and Great Britain at Newcastle upon Tyne.
- 21 November – suffragettes storm Parliament in London. All are arrested and choose prison terms.
- 24 November – an explosion starting in the basement of Bibby's Oil cake mill in Liverpool leaves thirty-nine dead and one hundred and one injured.
- 6 December – English Folk Dance Society formed by Cecil Sharp.
- 11 December – George V and Queen Mary are crowned as Emperor of India and Empress consort of India, respectively, at the Delhi Durbar in New Delhi.
- 16 December
  - National Insurance Act 1911 passed, providing for (limited) contributory health and unemployment insurance for working people.
  - Shops Act 1911 allows a weekly half holiday for shop staff.
- December 18–28 – George V's 1911 hunting trip in Nepal.

=== Undated ===
- Camden Town Group of post-Impressionist artists established in London.
- Completion of Westminster Central Hall as a Wesleyan Methodist church.

== Publications ==
- Encyclopædia Britannica eleventh edition published under American management by Cambridge University Press.
- Concise Oxford English Dictionary first edition.
- Frances Hodgson Burnett's novel The Secret Garden.
- G. K. Chesterton's short story collection The Innocence of Father Brown.
- Joseph Conrad's novel Under Western Eyes.
- Woman's Weekly magazine launched.

== Births ==
- 2 January – Sunny Lowry, first woman to swim the English Channel (died 2008)
- 4 January – David Shoenberg, physicist (born in Russia; died 2004)
- 8 January – Tom Delaney, racing driver and businessman (died 2006)
- 10 January – Norman Heatley, biologist (died 2004)
- 22 January – Mary Hayley Bell, actress and dramatist, wife of Sir John Mills (died 2005)
- 24 January
  - Evelyn Barbirolli, oboist, wife of Sir John Barbirolli (died 2008)
  - Rita Lawrence, pianist (died 2001)
- 26 January – William Fox, actor (born in the Philippines; died 2008)
- 29 January – Bryan Coleman, actor (died 2005)
- 19 February – Merle Oberon, actress (died 1979)
- 1 March – Harry Golombek, chess grandmaster (died 1995)
- 11 March – Sir Fitzroy Maclean, 1st Baronet, army officer, politician and writer (died 1996)
- 14 March – James Hill, army brigadier (died 2006)
- 15 March – Ursula Vaughan Williams, author (died 2007)
- 16 March – Ewart Jones, Welsh chemist (died 2002)
- 27 March – Erich Heller, philosopher (died 1990)
- 3 April – Michael Woodruff, transplant surgeon (died 2001)
- 6 April – Barbara Skinner, racing driver (died 1942)
- 15 April – Leonard Redshaw, shipbuilder (died 1989)
- 16 April – William T. Stearn, botanist (died 2001)
- 19 April
  - Frank Barlow, historian (died 2009)
  - Ursula Moray Williams, children's author (died 2006)
- 23 April – Ronald Neame, film cinematographer, producer, screenwriter and director (died 2010)
- 25 April – George Chubb, 3rd Baron Hayter, industrialist and politician (died 2003)
- 2 May – Alan Nunn May, physicist and Soviet spy (died 2003)
- 7 May – David Leach, potter (died 2005)
- 11 May – Geoffrey Paulson Townsend, architect (died 2002)
- 12 May – Billy Munn, jazz pianist (died 2000)
- 18 May – Michael Berry, newspaper proprietor (died 2001)
- 28 May – Thora Hird, comic actress (died 2003)
- 29 May – James Marjoribanks, diplomat (died 2002)
- 30 May – Ian Hogg, admiral (died 2003)
- 7 June – Stanley Unwin, actor and comedian (born in South Africa; died 2002)
- 10 June – Terence Rattigan, playwright (died 1977)
- 15 June – Wilbert Awdry, children's writer (died 1997)
- 16 June – Phyllis Sellick, pianist (died 2007)
- 17 June – James Cameron, journalist (died 1985)
- 22 June – Kenneth Mather, geneticist and botanist (died 1990)
- 23 June – Horace Law, admiral (died 2005)
- 3 July – Joe Hardstaff Jr, cricketer (died 1990)
- 7 July
  - Jesse Carver, footballer (died 2003)
  - Gretchen Franklin, actress (died 2005)
- 9 July – Mervyn Peake, writer and illustrator (died 1968)
- 14 July – Terry-Thomas, actor (died 1990)
- 15 July
  - Raymond Mander, theatre historian (died 1983)
  - Juliet Pannett, portrait painter (died 2005)
- 17 July – Ted Anderson, footballer (died 1979)
- 29 July – Leslie Scarman, judge (died 2004)
- 6 August – Constance Heaven, romance writer (died 1995)
- 10 August – A. N. Sherwin-White, ancient historian (died 1993)
- 20 August – John H. Plumb, historian (died 2001)
- 27 August – Kay Walsh, actress (died 2005)
- 29 August – John Charnley, orthopaedic surgeon (died 1982)
- 19 September – William Golding, novelist, Nobel Prize laureate (died 1993)
- 27 September – John Harvey, actor (died 1982)
- 30 September – Clare Deniz, jazz pianist (died 2002)
- 3 October – Michael Hordern, actor (died 1995)
- 4 October
  - Kenneth Cross, Air Force commander (died 2003)
  - Raymond Mitchenson, theatre historian (died 1992)
- 10 October – Clare Hollingworth, journalist (died 2017)
- 30 October – Eileen Ash, cricketer and supercentenarian (died 2021)
- 6 November – Philip Hope-Wallace, music and theatre critic (died 1979)
- 7 November – Alethea Hayter, writer (died 2006)
- 8 November – Geoffrey Nuttall, ecclesiastical historian (died 2007)
- 12 November – Chad Varah, priest and humanitarian (died 2007)
- 17 November – Ernest Lough, singer (died 2000)
- 23 November – Peter Saunders, theatre impresario (died 2003)
- 7 December – J. Gwyn Griffiths, poet and Egyptologist (died 2004)
- 11 December – Val Guest, film director (died 2006)
- 21 December – Frederick Lawton, judge (died 2001)
- 22 December – Danny O'Dea, actor (died 2003)
- 27 December – Anna Russell, comedian and singer (died 2006)

== Deaths ==
- 7 January – Sir John Aird, 1st Baronet, civil engineer (born 1833)
- 17 January – Sir Francis Galton, biologist and explorer (born 1822)
- 23 January – Edmund Beswick, rugby player (born 1858)
- 8 February – Frederick Campbell, 3rd Earl Cawdor, politician (born 1847)
- 23 February – Richard Henry Beddome, military officer and naturalist (born 1830)
- 3 March – Jacob Thomas, Victoria Cross recipient (born 1833)
- 6 March – Mary Anne Barker, author (born 1831)
- 22 March – William Collins, Anglican bishop (born 1867)
- 5 April – Charles Frederic Moberly Bell, journalist and newspaper editor (born 1847)
- 21 May – Williamina Fleming, astronomer (born 1857)
- 23 May – John Douglas, architect (born 1830)
- 25 May – William Ridley, missionary bishop (born 1836)
- 29 May
  - Benjamin Broomhall, advocate (born 1829)
  - W. S. Gilbert, librettist, playwright and comic writer (born 1836)
- 7 June – William Gordon, Roman Catholic bishop (born 1831)
- 12 July – Harry Day, Wales international rugby player (born 1863)
- 13 August – Thomas Thomas, Welsh boxer (born 1880)
- 18 August – Henry James, 1st Baron James of Hereford, politician (born 1828)
- 28 August – Jack Williams, Wales international rugby player (born 1882)
- 29 August – Hildegard Werner, musical conductor and journalist (born 1834 in Sweden)
- 16 September – Edward Whymper, mountaineer, in Chamonix (born 1840)
- 20 September – Sir Robert Hart, 1st Baronet, diplomat (born 1835)
- 30 September – Sir Herbert Risley, ethnographer and colonial administrator (born 1851)
- October – Blanche Atkinson, novelist (born 1847)
- 7 October – John Hughlings Jackson, neurologist (born 1835)
- 8 October – Hesba Stretton (Sarah Smith), children's writer (born 1832)
- 11 October – Henry Broadhurst, trade unionist, politician (born 1840)
- 27 October – Arthur Lloyd, Anglican missionary (born 1852)
- 30 October – Elizabeth Herbert, Baroness Herbert of Lea, Roman Catholic writer, translator, philanthropist and social figure (born 1822)
- 2 November – Kyrle Bellew, actor (born 1850)
- 3 November – George Chrystal, mathematician (born 1851)
- 14 November – Francis Buxton, barrister and politician (born 1847)
- 19 November – Billy Beaumont, footballer (born 1883)
- 20 November – Sophia Frances Anne Caulfeild, needlework artist (born 1824)
- 22 November – William George Aston, consular official (born 1841)
- 28 November – Lord George Sanger, showman, murdered (born 1825)
- 29 November – Stanley Calvert Clarke, army officer, courtier
- 7 December – Robert Maitland Brereton, civil engineer (born 1834)
- 10 December – Sir Joseph Dalton Hooker, botanist (born 1817)
- 11 December – Rowland Ellis, Episcopalian bishop (born 1841)
- 13 December – John Strange Winter (Henrietta Stannard), novelist (born 1856)
- 20 December – William McGregor, founder of the English Football League (born 1846)

== See also ==
- List of British films before 1920
