= HMS Melampus (1890) =

Apollo-class cruiser

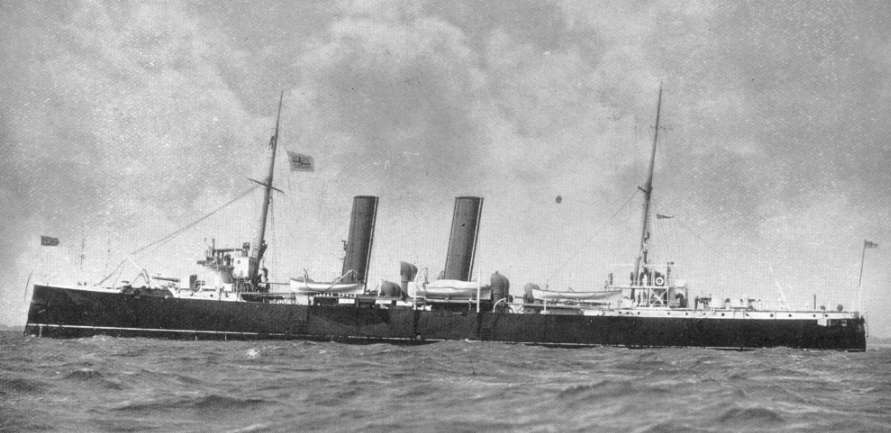

History

United Kingdom
- Name: HMS Melampus
- Namesake: Melampus
- Builder: Vickers, Barrow-in-Furness
- Laid down: 1889
- Launched: 2 August 1890
- Fate: Sold on 1 January 1910

General characteristics
- Class & type: Apollo-class protected cruiser
- Beam: 43 ft 8 in (13.31 m)
- Draught: 17 ft 6 in (5.33 m)
- Speed: 19.7 knots (36.5 km/h; 22.7 mph)
- Complement: 273 to 275
- Armament: two 6-inch guns; six 4.7-inch guns; eight 6-pounder guns; one 3-pounder all quick-firers

HMS Melampus was an Apollo-class protected cruiser of the Royal Navy which served from 1890 to 1910.

== History ==
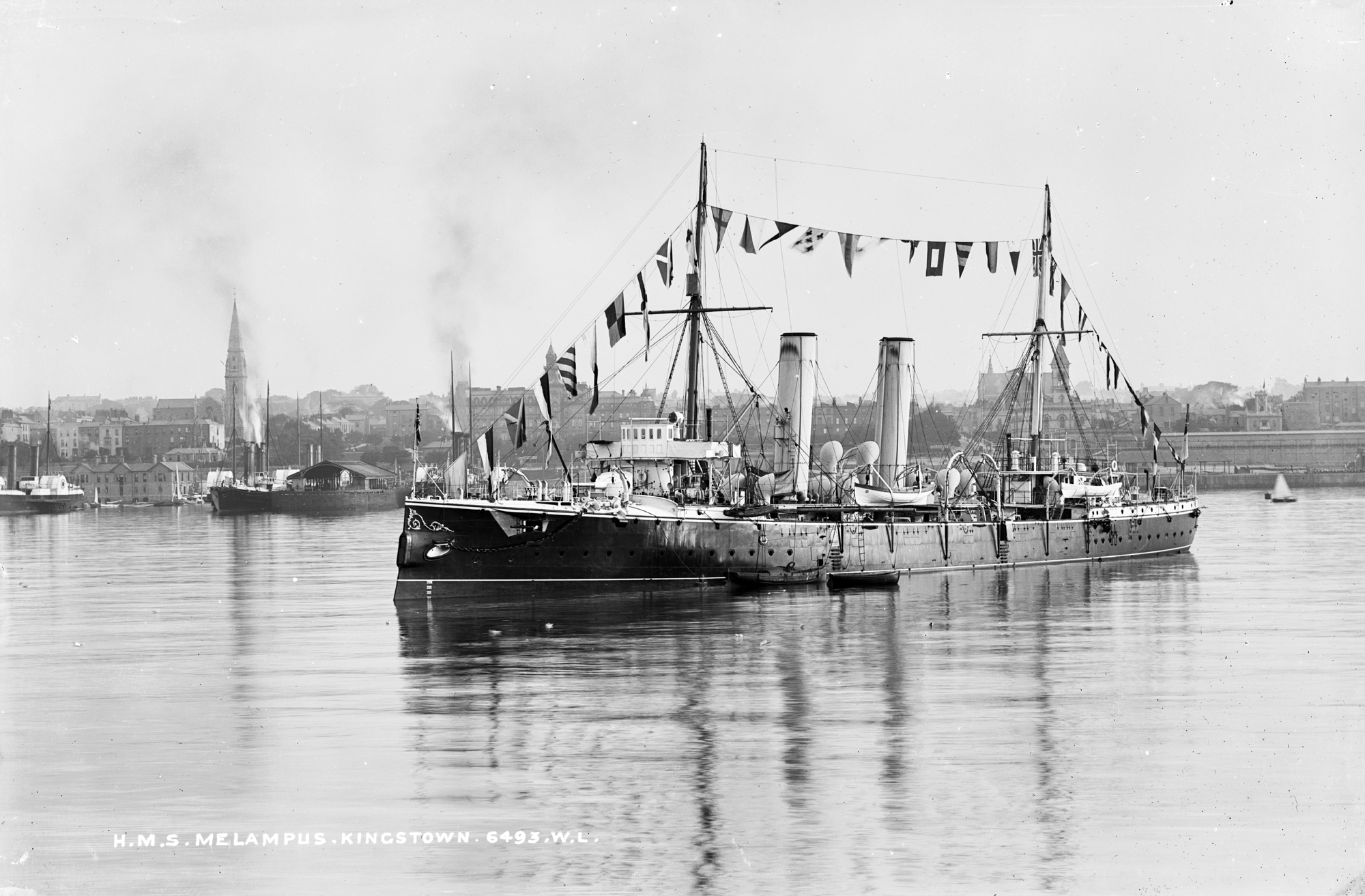
Melampus in the harbour of Kingstown, County Dublin

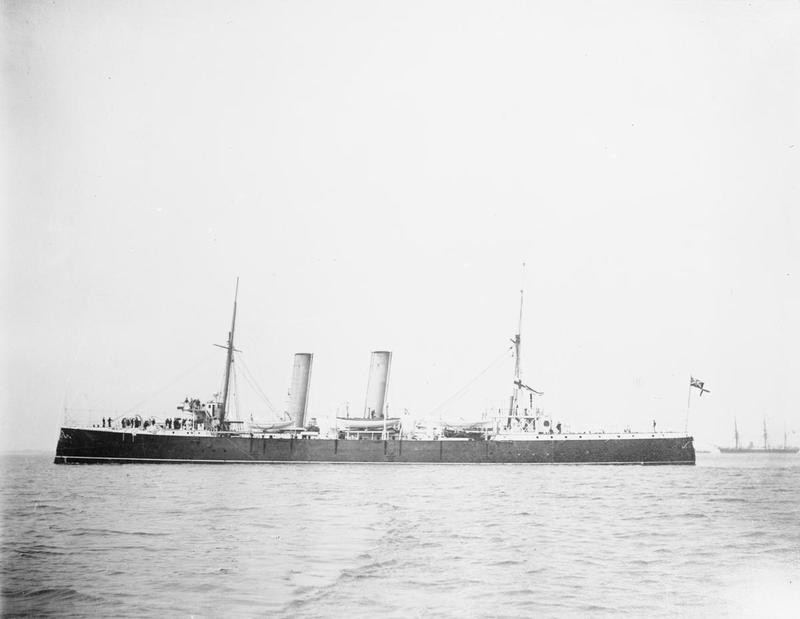
Melampus in 1892.

In 1890, building by the Naval Construction and Armaments Co, later known as Vickers, commenced. Melampus was originally ordered and built for the Greek navy.

In 1891, when Prince George of Wales (the future King George V) was promoted to commander, he assumed nominal command of Melampus. He relinquished his post in January 1892, on the death of his brother Prince Albert Victor, Duke of Clarence and Avondale.

On 5 July 1892, in Portsmouth, Melampus carried out trials of her machinery and other equipment, following which she swung her compasses at Spithead. She later departed on 7 July for Plymouth and Falmouth.

On 26 June 1897, she was present at the Naval Review at Spithead in celebration of the Diamond Jubilee.

On 16 January 1901, she accidentally grounded HMS Sybille.

She took part in the fleet review held at Spithead on 16 August 1902 for the coronation of King Edward VII, and later that month was off Ireland where she received the Japanese cruisers Asama and Takasago to Cork.

In 1903 Melampus was withdrawn as guard ship at Kingstown in Ireland.

On 12 July 1910, Melampus was sold for scrap for £9,000.

== Publications ==
- Colledge, J. J.; Warlow, Ben (2006) [1969]. Ships of the Royal Navy: The Complete Record of All Fighting Ships of the Royal Navy from the 15th Century to the Present (3rd Rev ed.). London: Chatham Publishing. ISBN 978-1-86176-281-8. OCLC 67375475.
