= 1911 hunt by George V in Nepal =

Hunting trip

George V's 1911 hunting trip in Nepal
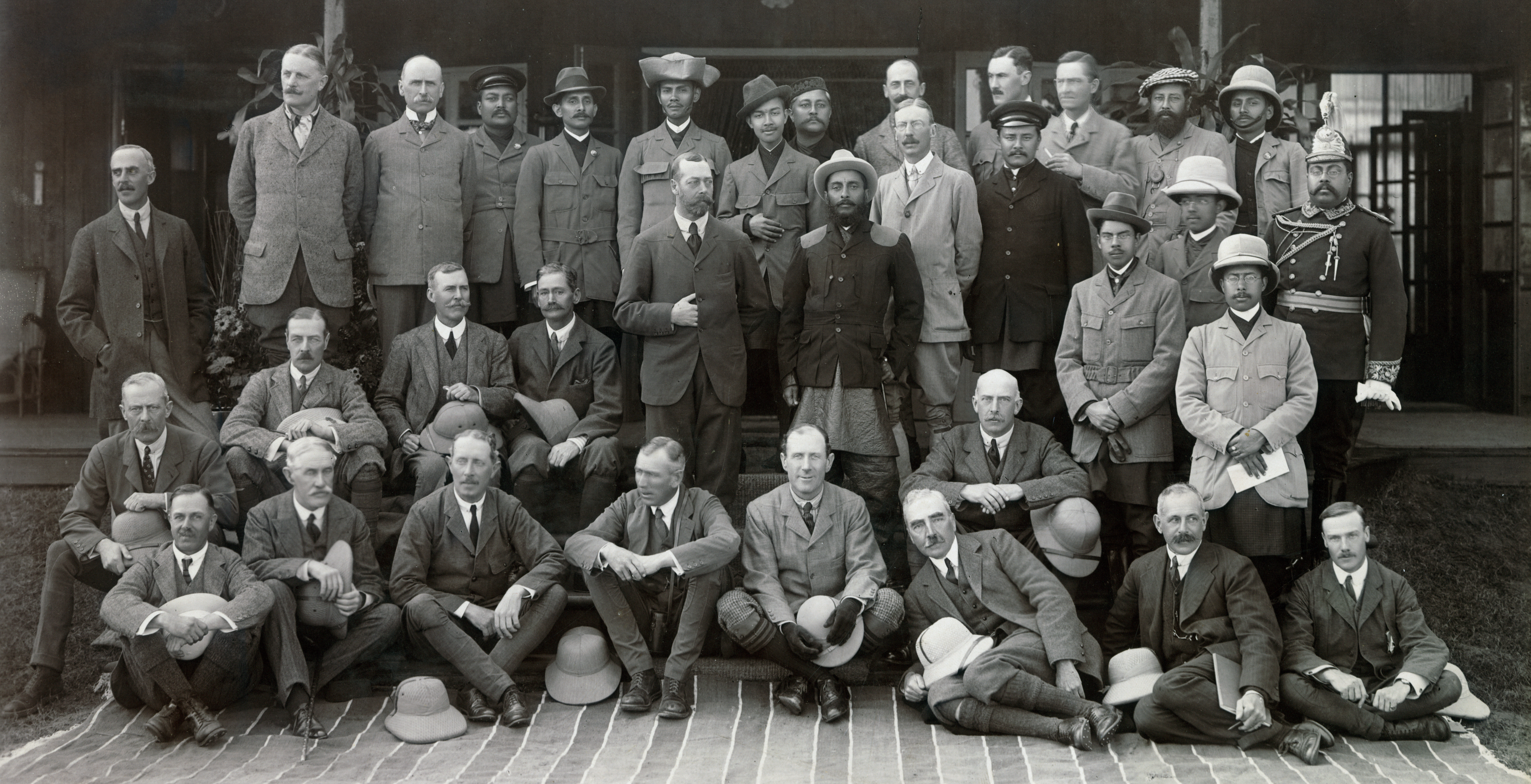
- The crew who participated in the hunt
- Date: 18–28 December 1911
- Location: Thori, Nepal
- Type: Hunting
- Participants: George V and others
- Deaths: 39 tigers, 18 rhinoceros, 4 bears, and several porcupines and leopards

Over 18–28 December 1911, King George V of the United Kingdom took part in a hunt in the Kingdom of Nepal as part of an expedition organised by the Prime Minister of Nepal, Chandra Shumsher Jang Bahadur Rana. The king had wanted to visit Nepal in 1905 but due to the ongoing cholera pandemic, he could not enter the region. The crew killed 39 tigers, 18 rhinoceros, 4 bears, and several porcupines and leopards over the course of the 10-day expedition. During the hunt, the king knighted Chandra Shumsher with the Royal Victorian Order.

== Planning ==
The British royals started to hunt in Nepal in 1876 after Nepali Prime Minister Jung Bahadur Rana invited Albert Edward (later King Edward VII) to an expedition which killed about 23 tigers in two weeks. Later many foreign dignitaries were invited by the Rana dynasty, including Archduke Franz Ferdinand of Austria, George Curzon, 1st Marquess Curzon of Kedleston, and Prince Albert Victor, Duke of Clarence and Avondale.

In 1905, Prince George, the future George V, King of the United Kingdom, wanted to visit the Kingdom of Nepal for a hunt but due to the ongoing 1899–1923 cholera pandemic he could not. In 1911, Prime Minister of Nepal Chandra Shumsher Jang Bahadur Rana invited George V to participate in big game hunting in Terai. Preparing for the hunt, Chandra Shumsher spent months collecting 645 elephants and bullocks and tied them in jungles to lure the tigers. The King of Nepal Prithvi Bir Bikram Shah died on 11 December but the preparations did not stop.

Thousands of elephant beaters were employed "to drive the game toward his waiting guns". About this event, George V told Charles Hardinge, 1st Baron Hardinge of Penshurst: "As probably this will be the last and only time in my life when I shall get big game shooting of this kind, I naturally want to have as many days in Nepal as possible". The Terai region of Nepal was protected from hunting's by rulers of Nepal but since 1846 it was allowed if the person obtained a permit from Maharajah or the Prime Minister. A few specimens from Nepal were shown in international museums such as The Royal College of Surgeons of England, and Indian Museum, Kolkata.

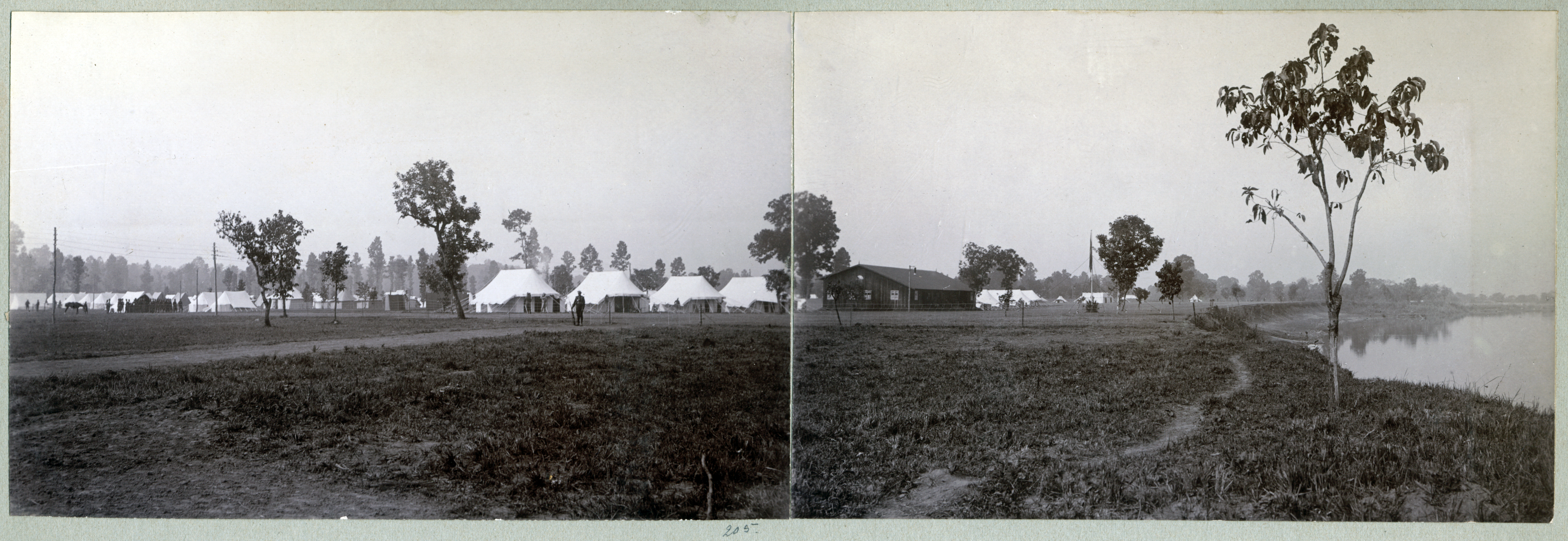
The large encampment built for the occasion

== The hunt ==
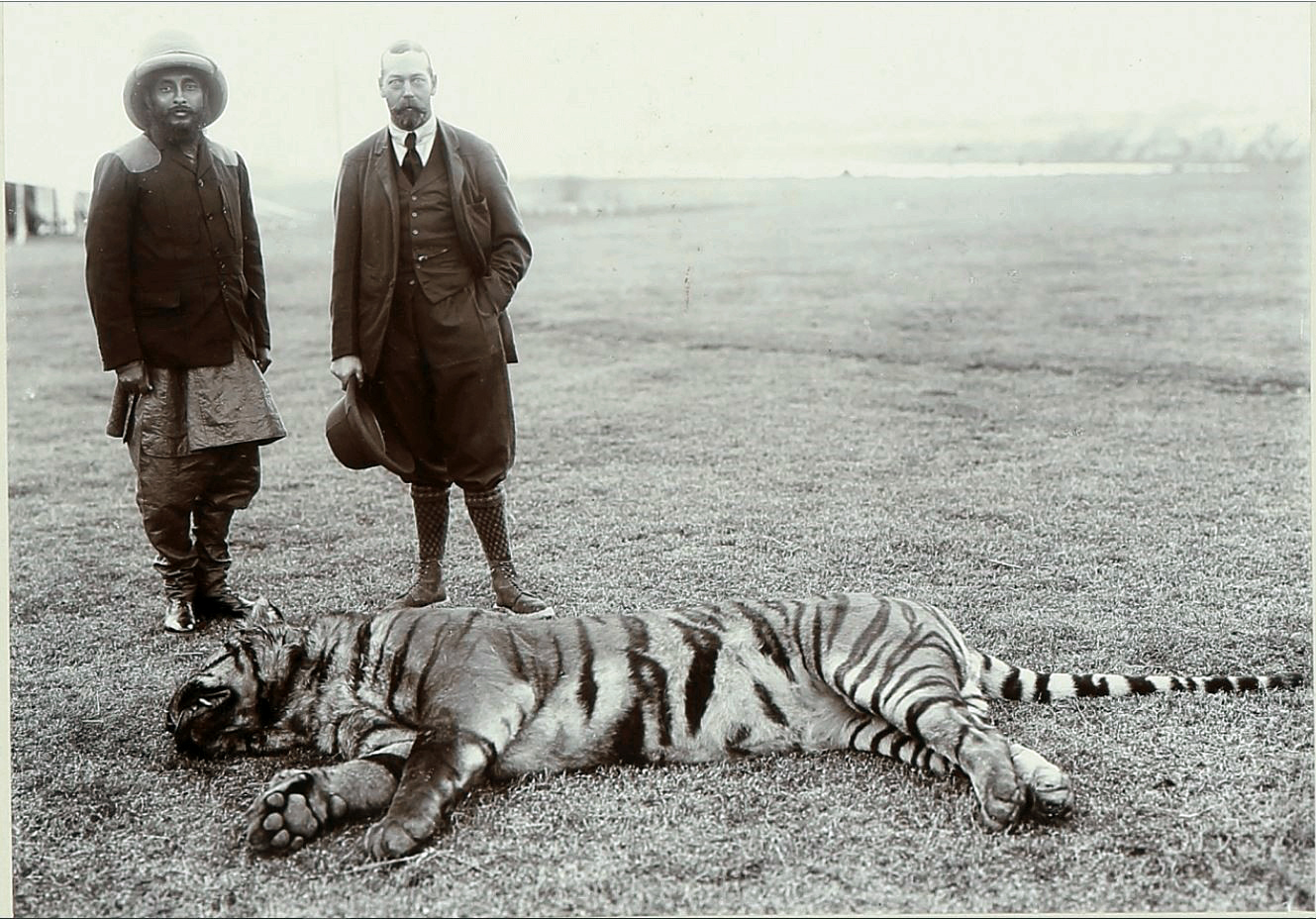
Prime Minister of Nepal Chandra Shumsher Rana and King George V with a shot tiger

After attending the Delhi Durbar, George V and Queen Mary travelled via boat and train from Patna and Bankipore to Bhikhna Thori railway station on 16 December. They arrived in Nepal at 10 am on Monday, 18 December, where the king was greeted by Chandra Shumsher. George then travelled from Bhikhna Thori railway station by car to Thori, Nepal. There was a large encampment for the king and his 12,000 followers, and there were roughly 2,000 attendees. During the hunt, every night baits were placed to lure tigers. On Tuesday, 19 December, information about a tiger went out so the team visited the place and the king killed the animal. Later that afternoon, one tiger and two rhinoceros were killed by Charles Cust, Colin Keppel, and Horace Smith-Dorrien respectively.

On Wednesday, 20 December, three separate groups went to look for tigers (two) and rhinoceros (one). The same day, the king killed a female tiger, and the hunters disturbed a rhino cow and calf, that charged at the elephants. After lunch, it was found that the next ring of elephants contained four tigers "roaring and snarling in a blood-curdling chorus, the tigers charged madly from side to side while the surrounding elephants trampled and trumpeted and the mahouts screamed and shouted". The king killed all four tigers. While the group was returning to camp, a big rhinoceros appeared suddenly out of a bush and the king killed it with two bullets. The same day, a bear was shot by Captain Bryan Godfrey-Faussett and Smith-Dorrien, and Faussett and Keppel both killed a tiger.

On Thursday, 21 December, George V killed four tigers and a bear, and a rhinoceros was shot by Faussett. The next day, the king killed three tigers in the field. A rhinoceros ran from the grass and was shot by Charles Cust; the king missed it but it was killed by Faussett. Lord Durham, Lord Charles Fitzmaurice, Derek Keppel, Colin Keppel, and Henry McMahon killed seven tigers and a Himalayan bear. On Saturday, the team moved to Kasra and on Sunday, 24 December, Rev. J. Godber led a divine service for Christmas Eve. Later that afternoon, the king went to inspect animal collections from Nepal with Kaiser Shumsher Jang Bahadur Rana. George V saw various animals including a young elephant, a rhinoceros calf, and a wild ass which were sent to the zoo in London, and various Nepali arts were shown as well which are now housed in the Victoria and Albert Museum. In the evening, the king knighted Chandra Shumsher with the Royal Victorian Order.

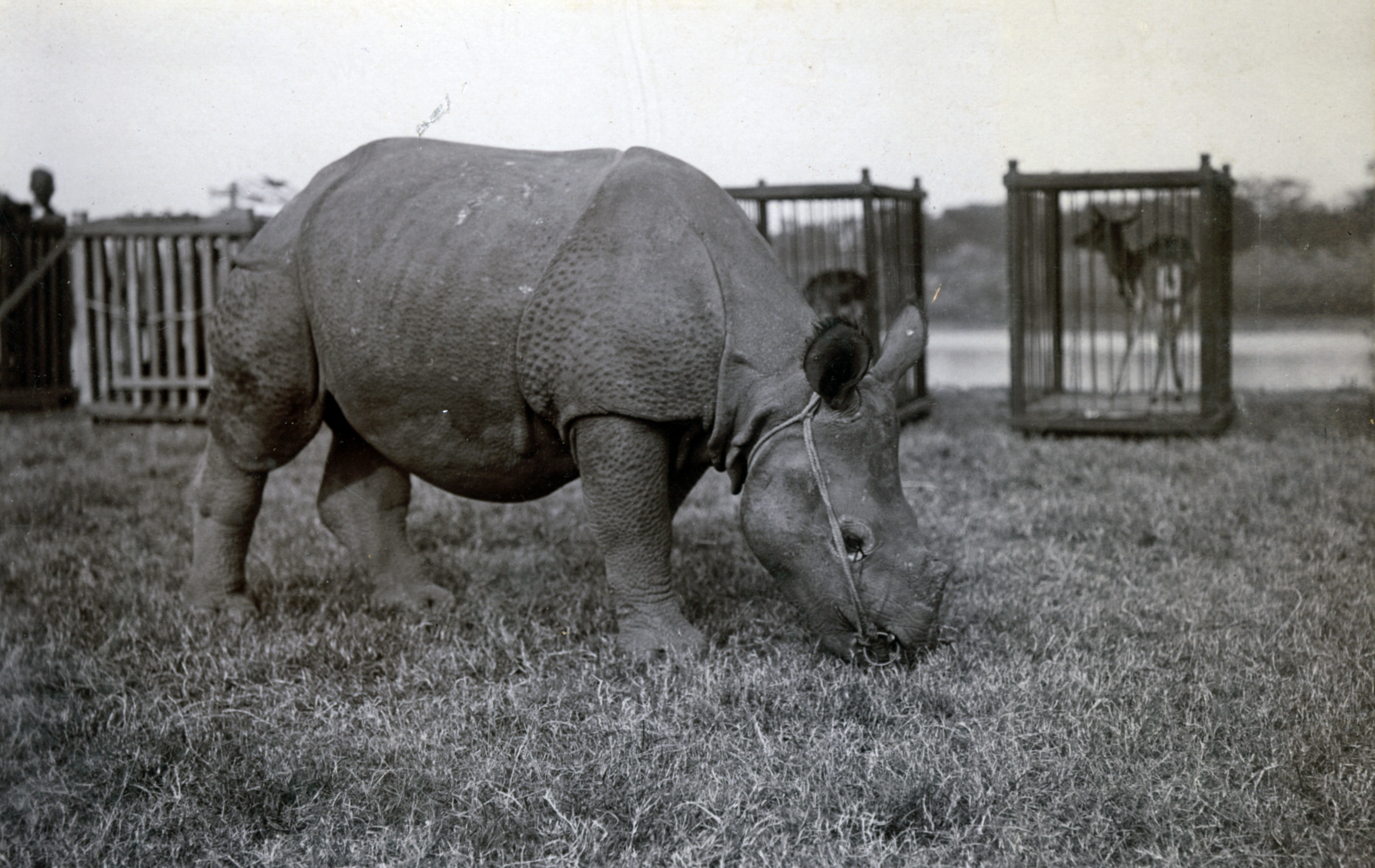
The rhino that was given to George V

On Monday, 25 December, George V shot a 9 ft 6 in (2.90 m) tiger and then killed two rhinos. The group led by the Duke of Teck killed three tigers and a rhinoceros. The hunting area had been disturbed because out of 60 baits only one tiger was trapped and was killed by Lord Durham, and the king shot one rhinoceros the same day. During the last days of the hunts, on Wednesday, the king killed one female tiger which was his 20th kill. Thursday, 28 December, was the last day of the hunt; that day the king and the Duke of Teck shot a tiger at the same time. The crew travelled by car to Bhikhna Thori railway station where a train was waiting for them; while going to the station, the king killed his 21st tiger. The team reportedly killed a total of 39 tigers, 18 rhinoceros, 4 bears, and several porcupines and leopards over the course of ten days. George V reportedly laid claim to having killed 21 tigers, 8 rhinoceros, and 1 bear.

It is not known how all the trophies were distributed but four of the tiger skins were given to national museums across the United Kingdom – London, Edinburgh, Cardiff, and Dublin – and four to provincial museums – Exeter, Norwich, Leicester, and Bristol. A living rhinoceros was given to the king on 24 December; it was kept in the Zoological Garden, Alipore, then on 1 April 1912 it was moved to the Zoological Gardens in London. British diplomat and naturalist Brian Houghton Hodgson documented over 560 species of birds (with 9,500 specimens), 900 mammals, and 80 reptiles.

== Notable attendees ==
List of notable people who attended the hunt
Name	Note(s)	Ref(s)
George V		
Mary of Teck		
Chandra Shumsher Jang Bahadur Rana		
Kaiser Shumsher Jang Bahadur Rana		
Bryan Godfrey-Faussett		
Colin Keppel		
Lord Durham		
Lord Charles Fitzmaurice		
Derek Keppel		
Henry McMahon		
The Duke of Teck		

== Legacy ==
A record, and I think will be hard to beat.

— King George V

Sanjib Chaudhary, writing in 2018 for Online Khabar, noted that it was "the most barbaric and horrific hunting trip". In 2015, Sankarshan Thakur reported that the hunting lodge built for the occasion was now being used as "an abandoned gambling den". The photographs taken during the hunt are reportedly valued at £2,000. Where most of the hunt took place was turned into the first national park in Nepal Chitwan National Park in 1973.

In 1922, George V's son Edward, Prince of Wales, went to Nepal to hunt. There he killed his first rhinoceros and tiger. The prince was presented with many animals and birds, including baby elephant, tiger and rhino calf which were kept at the Victoria Gardens, Bombay, then moved to the London Zoo.

An account of the 1911 hunt, written from the point of view of a female tiger, features in the 1987 children's novel You're thinking about doughnuts by the future Children's Laureate Michael Rosen. The tiger, now a stuffed exhibit at a fictionalised "City Museum", describes the overwhelming numbers of people and elephants involved in encircling herself and her three cubs in order to enable her killing by George.
