= Leonard Redshaw =

English shipbuilder (1911–1989)

Sir Leonard Redshaw
- Born: 15 April 1911; Barrow-in-Furness, Lancashire, England
- Died: 29 April 1989 (aged 78); Ireleth, Cumbria, England
- Occupation: Ship builder
- Years active: 1927–1976
- Known for: Senior figure at Vickers ship yard

Sir Leonard Redshaw (15 April 1911 – 29 April 1989) was a shipbuilder from Barrow-in-Furness, England.

Like his father, Redshaw became an apprentice ships' draughtsman at Vickers shipyard at the age of 16. Though this was unusual at the time, he completed graduate work at Liverpool University in naval architecture, including some time in German plants in 1934. After advancing through management, he became the Shipbuilding Manager at the yard in 1950, aged 39, and then the managing director of the Barrow-based Vickers Shipbuilding Group in 1965. In 1968, he became the chairman of the company, and was knighted for his contributions to British exports in 1972. He retired in 1976, having been promoted to deputy chairman of Vickers. In later life, he was a member of a so-called "Suicide Squad" of older engineers and scientists who volunteered to be first responders in disasters involving nuclear reactors.

At Barrow, Redshaw oversaw the building of HMS Dreadnought, the United Kingdom's first nuclear-powered submarine, and subsequently saw Barrow achieve a monopoly on the construction of British nuclear submarines. The Dreadnought success also led to the yard being appointed the primary builder of the submarines for the UK Polaris programme. During this time, Redshaw was named as the "Builders Chief Polaris Executive"; on this project, he worked opposite and alongside Rear Admiral Hugh McKenzie of the Royal Navy. The pair were mutually hostile, with Redshaw doubting that McKenzie had the business acumen to handle the project, and McKenzie thinking Redshaw and Barrow's plant to be highly outdated.

The shipyard was highly profitable under his management, succeeding while other shipbuilding ventures were failing and becoming the major profit centre of the wider Vickers company. Despite this, Redshaw had a series of protracted disagreements with the ship builders' unions concerning the company's direction, and he was in turn critical of the unions' power.

Redshaw published two books, British Shipbuilding-Welding (1947) and Application of Welding to Ship Construction (1962).

== Personal ==
Redshaw married Joan Mary (née White) in 1939. They had a daughter and a son. He was a gliding enthusiast, logging over 3,000 hours in the air, and owner of several glider models.

A biography of Redshaw, Vickers' Master Shipbuilder: Sir Leonard Redshaw by Leslie M. Shaw, was published in 2011 by Black Dwarf Publications.
