= Billy Beaumont =

English footballer

Personal information
- Full name: William Edward Beaumont
- Date of birth: 9 November 1883
- Place of birth: Ashton-in-Makerfield, England
- Date of death: 19 November 1911 (aged 28)
- Place of death: Portsmouth, England
- Height: 5 ft 9 in (1.75 m)
- Position: Half back

Senior career*
Years	Team	Apps	(Gls)
1906–1907	Swindon Town	49	(0)
1907–1910	Portsmouth	70	(2)
1910–1911	Southampton	27	(0)
- * Club domestic league appearances and goals

William Edward Beaumont (9 November 1883 – 19 November 1911) was an English footballer who played as a half back for three Southern League clubs in the early part of the twentieth century.

== Football career ==
Beaumont was born in Ashton-in-Makerfield near Wigan, but started his professional football career in February 1906 with Swindon Town in the Southern League. He remained at Swindon until the start of the 1907–08 season, when he moved to the south coast to join Portsmouth for a fee of £75.

He played for Portsmouth for three years on a part-time basis, while working as a motor engineer. In his time at Fratton Park he performed consistently, but Portsmouth were unable to regain the league title, with a best finish of fourth in 1908–09.

In October 1910, he was on the verge of retiring when he received an offer from Southampton. Beaumont therefore joined the "Saints", again on a part-time basis. He trained nightly at Fratton Park and only made contact with the Southampton team on match days.

According to "The Alphabet of the Saints", he was "never a brilliant player (but) was, nonetheless, versatile" and could play in any of the half back positions. He made his Southampton debut on 29 October 1910 in a 3–2 defeat at Brentford and only missed three matches as Saints finished the season just one point above the relegation places.

Beaumont left the Saints in the summer of 1911 and retired from football. Within months he had contracted pneumonia and died on 19 November 1911, a few days after his 28th birthday.
