= Household of Edward VII and Alexandra =

Departments of the British royal family

The Households of Edward VII and Alexandra supported the work of the monarch and his consort between January 1901 and May 1910. The Royal Households of the United Kingdom consist of royal officials, office-holders and staff; members of the Royal Family who undertake public duties each have their own (separate or joint) Households.

King Edward VII (1841–1910) had been created Prince of Wales shortly after his birth. The household of the Prince of Wales was first formed in 1843, with appointments being made 'for the time being' by his mother, Queen Victoria. On attaining his majority, in 1862, the Prince of Wales began making his own household appointments. When he was married, the following year, his wife Alexandra (1844–1925) established her own household of the Princess of Wales.

When Edward became king his household expanded significantly, becoming the household of the Sovereign. Queen Alexandra received a separate household upon her husband's accession: the household of the Queen; after her husband's death in 1910, it was known as the household of Queen Alexandra.

== Household of the Prince of Wales 1843–1901 ==
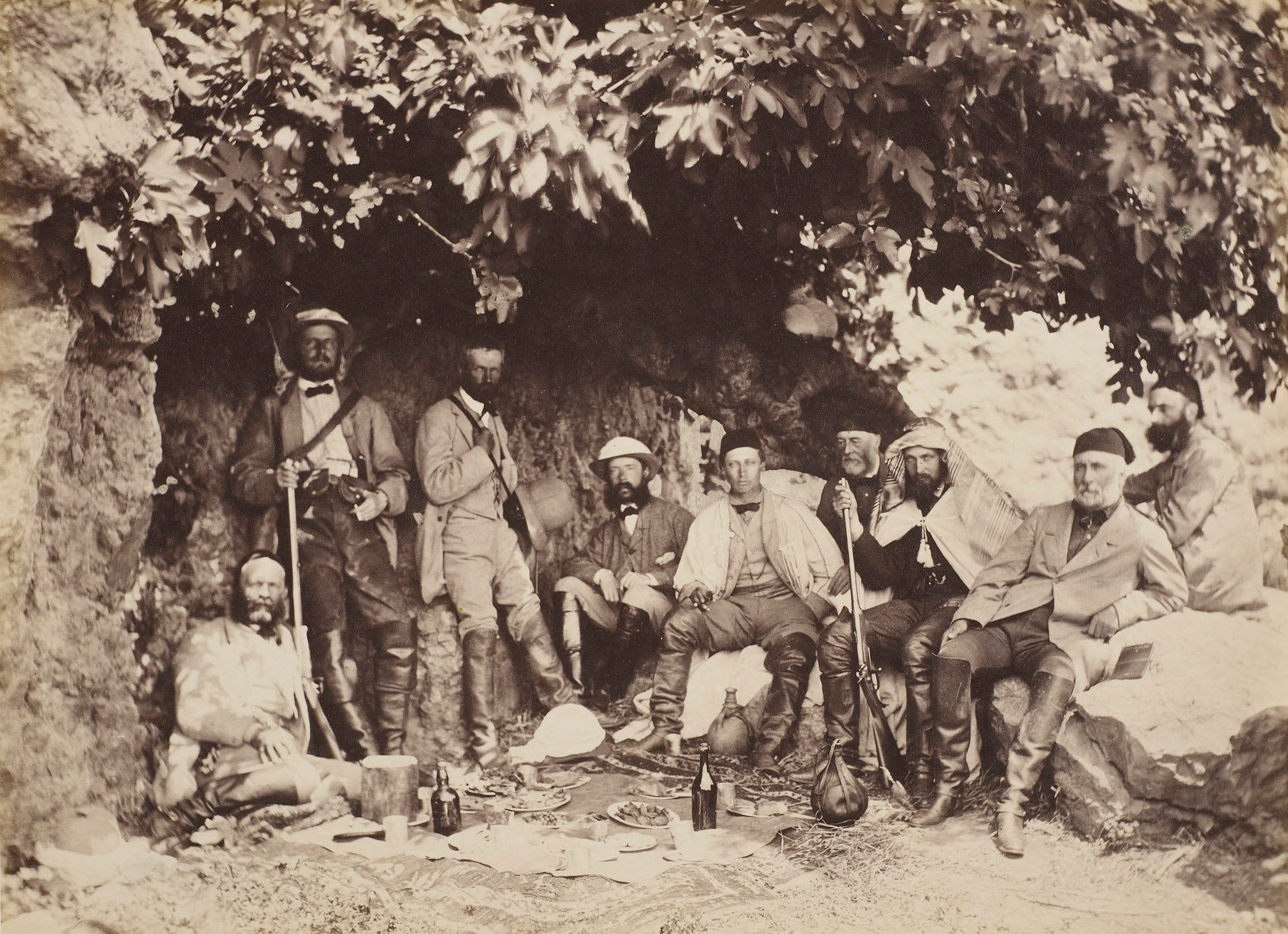
The Prince of Wales (centre-right) in Capernaum, 1862, with members of his household, including Maj. Teesdale and Capt. Keppel (Equerries), Col. Bruce (Governor), the Rev. Arthur Stanley (Hon. Chaplain), Dr Minter (Surgeon) and the Hon. Robert Meade (Groom-in-Waiting).

=== 1843–1862 ===
==== Treasurer and Cofferer of the Household of the Prince of Wales ====
- 1843–1856: George Edward Anson, Esq.
- 1856–1862: Lt-Col. the Hon. Charles Beaumont Phipps

==== Governor to the Prince of Wales ====
- 1858–1862: Colonel the Honourable Robert Bruce

==== Equerry to the Prince of Wales ====
- 1858–1859: Brevet-Major Robert James Lindsay
- 1858–1862: Brevet-Major Christopher Teesdale
- 1858–1862: Capt. George Henry Grey
- 1859–1862: Capt. Frederick Charles Keppel

==== Extra Equerry to the Prince of Wales ====
- 1858–1862: Viscount Valletort

=== 1862–1901 ===
==== Groom of the Stole to the Prince of Wales ====
- 1863–1877: John Spencer, 5th Earl Spencer
- 1877–1886: General Right Honourable Sir William T. Knollys
- 1886–1901: James Hamilton, 1st Duke of Abercorn

==== Lords of the Bedchamber in Waiting to the Prince of Wales ====
- 1863–1879: William Edgcumbe, 4th Earl of Mount Edgcumbe
- 1863–1872: Lord Alfred Hervey
- 1866–1886: Viscount (later Marquis of) Hamilton (afterwards Duke of Abercorn)
- 1872–1901: Charles Harbord, 5th Baron Suffield
- 1886–1901: Archibald Acheson, 4th Earl of Gosford

==== Comptroller of the Household and Treasurer to the Prince of Wales ====
- 1863–1877: Lieut.-General W. T. Knollys
- 1877–1901: Lt-Gen. Sir Dighton Macnaghten Probyn

==== Grooms of the Bedchamber in Waiting to the Prince of Wales ====
- 1862–1867: The Hon. Robert Henry Meade(Extra 1867-1898)
- 1862–1877: the Hon. Charles Lindley Wood
- 1867–1895: the Hon. Alexander Temple Fitzmaurice
- 1877–1886: Andrew Pepys Cockerell, Esq.
- 1886–1901: Sir Francis Knollys
- 1895–1901: the Hon. Henry Stonor

==== Equerries in Waiting to the Prince of Wales ====
- 1862–1890: Major-General Sir Christopher Charles Teesdale
- 1862–1875: Major George Henry Grey
- 1862–1872: Lieutenant-Colonel F. C. Keppel
- 1867–1899: Major-General Sir Arthur Ellis
- 1872 Major-General the Hon. A. Harding
- 1872–1877: Major-General Dighton Probyn
- 1875–1878: Major John Cecil Russell
- 1878–1881, 1890–1893: Captain Henry Frederick Stephenson
- 1881–1891: the Hon. Harry Tyrwhitt Tyrwhitt-Wilson
- 1882–1901: Col. Stanley de Astel Calvert Clarke
- 1892: Lt Count Albert Edward Gleichen
- 1892–1901: Captain George Lindsay Holford
- 1893–1901: Cdr the Hon. Seymour John Fortescue
- 1899–1901: the Hon. Sidney Greville

===== Extra Equerries to the Prince of Wales =====
- 1867–1901: Col. Sir R. Nigel F. Kingscote
- 1874–1901: Lieutenant-Colonel Robert Loyd-Lindsay, 1st Baron Wantage
- 1874–1876: Lieutenant-Colonel Frederick Charles Keppel
- 1878–1901: Col. John Cecil Russell
- 1881–1890, 1893–1901: Capt. Henry F. Stephenson
- 1885–1889: Major Lord Henry Arthur George Somerset
- 1886–1901: Capt. the Hon. Alwyn Henry Fulke Greville
- 1890–1893: Major-General Sir Christopher Charles Teesdale
- 1899–1901: Major-General Sir Arthur Ellis

==== Private Secretary to the Prince of Wales ====
- 1863–1870: Herbert W. Fisher, Esq.
- 1870–1901: Sir Francis Knollys

==== Librarian to the Prince of Wales ====
- 1864: Maurice Holzmann

==== Superintendent of the Prince of Wales's Stables ====
- –1885: Col. Robert Nigel Fitzhardinge Kingscote
- 1885–1889: Maj. Lord Henry Arthur George Somerset
- 1889–1901: Lord Suffield

==== Honorary Chaplains to the Prince of Wales ====
- 1863–1881: the Reverend Arthur Penrhyn Stanley
- 1863–1875: The Reverend Charles Kingsley
- 1863–: the Reverend Henry Mildred Birch
- 1863–: the Reverend Charles Feral Tarver
- 1867–: the Reverend William Lake Onslow
- 1875–1901: the Reverend Robinson Duckworth
- 1892–1901: the Reverend Canon J. Fleming
- 1900–1901: the Reverend James William Adams
- 1900–1901: the Reverend Francis Stanley ffolkes

==== Medical household ====
===== Physicians in Ordinary to the Prince of Wales =====
- 1863–1898: Sir William Jenner, 1st Baronet
- 1863–1901: Edward Sieveking, Esq.
- 1872–1890: Sir William W. Gull, Bart.
- 1892–1901: William Henry Broadbent, Esq.
- 1899–1901: Sir James Reid, 1st Baronet

===== Surgeons in Ordinary to the Prince of Wales =====
- 1863–1899: James Paget, Esq.
- 1863–1899: George Pollock, Esq.
- 1868–1892: Oscar Clayton, Esq. (Extra)
- 1874–1891: Prescott Gardiner Hewett, Esq.
- 1897–1901: Sir William MacCormac, Bart.
- 1897–1901: Alfred Downing Fripp

===== Surgeon to the Prince of Wales's Household =====
- 1898–1901: Herbert William Allingham, Esq.

===== Surgeon Extraordinary =====
- 1863–: John Minter, Esq.

===== Honorary Physicians =====
- 1863–1889: Thomas King Chambers, Esq.
- 1863–1899: Alexander Armstong, Esq.
- 1863–1900: Henry Wentworth Acland, Esq.
- 1876–1901: Surgeon-General Sir Joseph Fayrer
- 1885–1901: John Lowe, Esq.
- 1890–1901: Sir Dyce Duckworth
- 1899–1901: Fleet Surgeon Alfred Gideon Delmege

===== Honorary Surgeon to the Prince of Wales in Scotland =====
- 1876–: Professor Perrie

===== Surgeon Dentist =====
- 1863–1901: Edwin Saunders, Esq.

===== Surgeon Apothecary to the Household =====
- 1863–: Claudius F. Du Pasquier, Esq.
- 1879–1901: Francis Henry Laking

== Household of the Princess of Wales 1863–1901 ==
=== Chamberlain to the Princess of Wales ===
- 1863–1873: George Harris, 3rd Baron Harris
- 1873–1901: Charles Colville, 10th Lord Colville of Culross

=== Ladies of the Bedchamber to the Princess of Wales ===
- 1863–1873: Fanny Osborne, Marchioness of Carmarthen (Duchess of Leeds from 1871)
- 1863–1866: Henrietta Robinson, Countess de Grey
- 1863–1901: Helen Douglas, Countess of Morton
- 1863–1901: Mary Parker, Countess of Macclesfield
- 1872–1901: Lady Emily Kingscote
- 1873–1901: Cecilia Harbord, Baroness Suffield
- 1895–1901: Edith Bulwer-Lytton, Countess of Lytton

=== Women of the Bedchamber to the Princess of Wales ===
- 1863–1865: Mrs Robert Bruce (Extra 1865–1889)
- 1863–1873: Mrs William George Grey (Extra 1873–1901)
- 1863–?: Mrs Edward Coke
- 1863–?: Mrs. Francis Stonor
- 1865–1901: the Hon. Mrs Arthur Hardinge
- 1873–1901: (Elizabeth) Charlotte Knollys
- 1893–1901: the Hon. Mrs Charles Hardinge

=== Private secretary to the Princess of Wales ===
- 1863–1870: Herbert W. Fisher
- 1870–1889: Maurice Holzmann
- 1889–1901: Stanley de A. C. Clarke

== Household of King Edward VII 1901–1910 ==
=== Personal appointments ===
==== Keeper of the Privy Purse ====
- 1901–1910: General Sir Dighton Probyn

==== Private Secretary ====
- 1901–1910: Sir Francis Knollys (from 1902 Baron Knollys, later Viscount Knollys)

=== Lord Steward's Department ===
(Board of Green Cloth, Buckingham Palace)

==== Lord Steward of the King's Household ====
- 1901–1905: Sidney Herbert, 14th Earl of Pembroke
- 1905–1907: Cecil Foljambe, 1st Earl of Liverpool
- 1907–1910: William Lygon, 7th Earl Beauchamp

==== Treasurer of the King's Household ====
- 1901–1903: Victor Cavendish (later Duke of Devonshire)
- 1903–1905: James Hamilton, Marquess of Hamilton (later Duke of Abercorn)
- 1905–1909: Sir Edward Strachey, 4th Baronet. (later Baron Strachie)
- 1909–1910: William Dudley Ward

==== Comptroller of the King's Household ====
- 1901–1905: Arthur Annesley, 11th Viscount Valentia
- 1905–1909: Alexander Murray, Master of Elibank (later Baron Murray of Elibank)
- 1909–1910: Arthur Foljambe, 2nd Earl of Liverpool

==== Master of the King's Household ====
- 1901–1907: Horace Farquhar, 1st Baron Farquhar (later Earl Farquhar)
- 1907–1910: Lieutenant-Colonel Sir Charles Arthur Frederick

===== Deputy Master of the King's Household =====
- 1901–1907: Lieutenant-Colonel Charles Arthur Frederick (app Master of the Household 1907)
- 1907–1910: Harry Lloyd-Verney, Esq.

==== Secretary of the King's Board of Green Cloth ====
- 1901–1903: George Courroux
- 1903–1907: Charles Frederick (Acting Secretary)

==== Gentleman of the Cellars to the King ====
- 1901–1910: Thomas Kingscote

==== Coroner of the King's Household ====
- 1901–1910: Arthur Walter Mills

==== Lord High Almoner to the King ====
- 1901–1906: Lord Alwyne Compton, Bishop of Ely
- 1906–1910: Armitage Robinson, Dean of Westminster

===== Sub-Almoner to the King =====
- 1901–1910: Edgar Sheppard

=== Lord Chamberlain's Department ===
(St James's Palace)

==== Lord Chamberlain ====
- 1901–1905: Edward Villiers, 5th Earl of Clarendon
- 1905–1910: Charles Spencer, Viscount Althorp (later Earl Spencer)

==== Vice-Chamberlain ====
- 1901–1902: Sir Alexander Acland-Hood, 4th Baronet (later Baron St. Audries)
- 1902–1905: Frederick Glyn, 4th Baron Wolverton
- 1905–1907: Wentworth Beaumont (Baron Allendale from 1907, later Viscount Allendale)
- 1907–1910: Sir John Fuller, 1st Baronet

==== Comptroller of Accounts ====
- 1901–1907: Major-General Sir Arthur Ellis
- 1907–1910: Colonel Douglas Frederick Rawdon Dawson (Comptroller in the Lord Chamberlain's Department)

==== Lords-in-Waiting ====
- 1901–1910: Charles Harbord, 5th Baron Suffield
- 1901–1903: Richard Curzon, 4th Earl Howe
- 1901–1905: Rudolph Feilding, 9th Earl of Denbigh
- 1901–1905: Algernon Keith-Falconer, 9th Earl of Kintore
- 1901–1905: Lloyd Tyrell-Kenyon, 4th Baron Kenyon
- 1901–1905: Victor Spencer, 3rd Baron Churchill (from 1902 Viscount Churchill)
- 1901–1905: John Lawrence, 2nd Baron Lawrence
- 1903–1905: Charles Hay, 20th Earl of Erroll
- 1905–1910: Granville Leveson-Gower, 3rd Earl Granville
- 1905–1907: Bernard Forbes, 8th Earl of Granard
- 1905–1910: Gavin Hamilton, 2nd Baron Hamilton of Dalzell
- 1905–1910: Richard Lyon-Dalberg-Acton, 2nd Baron Acton
- 1905–1907: Thomas Denman, 3rd Baron Denman
- 1905–1910: Edward Colebrooke, 1st Baron Colebrooke
- 1907–1910: Richard Herschell, 2nd Baron Herschell
- 1907–1910: Maurice Towneley-O'Hagan, 3rd Baron O'Hagan
- 1910: Dudley Marjoribanks, 3rd Baron Tweedmouth

==== Grooms-in-Waiting ====
- 1901–1907: Colonel Lord Edward Clinton
- 1901–1910: Sidney Greville
- 1901–1910: Henry Julian Stonor
- 1901–1905: Vice-Admiral Sir John Reginald Thomas Fullerton
- 1901–1908: Sir Alexander Condie Stephen
- 1901–1908: General Sir Godfrey Clerk
- 1901–1910: Captain Walter Douglas Somerset Campbell
- 1905–1907: The Hon. Arthur Henry John Walsh
- 1907–1910: Sir Archibald Edmonstone, Bart
- 1907–1908: Rear-Admiral Sir Archibald Berkeley Milne, Bart
- 1908–1910: Sir John Pepys Lister-Kaye, Bart
- 1908: Colonel Henry Streatfeild
- 1908–1910: Commander Charles Elphinstone Cunninghame-Graham
- 1908–1910: Montague Eliot, Esq.

===== Extra Grooms-in-Waiting =====
- 1901–1910: Alexander Grantham Yorke
- 1901–1910: Major-General Sir Thomas Dennehy
- 1901–1909: Sir Maurice Holzmann
- 1901–1904: General Sir Michael Biddulph
- 1905–1910: Admiral Sir John Reginald Thomas Fullerton
- 1909–1910: Sir Donald Mackenzie Wallace

==== Master of the Ceremonies ====
- 1901–1903: Colonel Sir William James Colville
- 1903–1907: Sir Douglas Dawson
- 1907–1910: Sir Arthur Walsh

===== Marshal of the Ceremonies =====
- 1901–1910: Richard Charles Moreton

===== Assistant-Marshal of the Ceremonies =====
- 1901–1910: Robert Follett Synge

==== Gentleman Usher of the Black Rod ====
- 1901–1904: General Sir Michael Biddulph
- 1904–1910: Admiral Sir Henry Stephenson

==== Gentleman Usher to the Sword of State ====
- 1901–1910: Sir Spencer Ponsonby-Fane

==== Gentlemen Ushers ====
- 1901–1902: Aubrey FitzClarence (later Earl of Munster)
- 1901–1903: Major-General John Ramsay Slade
- 1901–1905: Charles James Innes-Ker
- 1901–1908: Montague Eliot (later Earl of St Germans)
- 1901–1908: Captain Walter Stopford
- 1901–1909: Major-General John Brabazon
- 1901–1910?: Colonel Cuthbert Larking
- 1901–1910: Sir Spencer Ponsonby-Fane
- 1901–1910: Major Arthur Hay
- 1901–1910: Captain Otway Cuffe
- 1901–1910: Henry Julian Stonor
- 1901–1910: Arthur Collins
- 1901–1910: Sir Lionel Cust
- 1901–1910: Sir Henry Erskine
- 1901–1910: Arnold Royle
- 1901–1910: Brook Taylor
- 1901–1910: Horace West
- 1902–1905: Arthur Walsh (replacing FitzClarence)
- 1903–1910: Percy Armytage (replacing Slade)
- 1905–1910: Sir John Ramsay Slade (replacing Innes-Ker)
- 1905–1907: Harry Lloyd-Verney (replacing Walsh)
- 1907–1910: Charles Windham (replacing Verney)
- June 1908–October 1908: Charles Cunninghame-Graham (replacing Stopford)
- 1908–1910: Thomas Arthur Fitzhardinge Kingscote (replacing Cunninghame-Graham) (previously 'honorary' since 1903)
- 1908–1910: Gerald Ellis (replacing Eliot)
- 1909–1910: Henry Fludyer (replacing Brabazon)
- 1909-1910: Col. Lord William Cecil (honorary)

==== Governor and Constable of Windsor Castle ====
- 1901–1910: John Campbell, 9th Duke of Argyll

===== Deputy Governor and Constable of Windsor Castle =====
- 1901–1910: Reginald Brett, 2nd Viscount Esher

==== Librarian at Windsor Castle ====
- 1901–1905: Richard R. Holmes
- 1905–1910: John Fortescue

==== Poet Laureate ====
- 1901–1910: Alfred Austin

==== Surveyor of the King's Pictures ====
- 1901–1910: Sir Lionel Cust

==== Keeper of the King's Armoury ====
- 1901–1910: Guy Francis Laking

==== Master of the King's Music ====
- 1901–1910: Sir Walter Parratt

==== Marine Painter in Ordinary ====
- 1901–1910: Edward de Martino

==== Keeper of the Jewel House, Tower of London ====
- 1901–1909: General Sir Hugh Henry Gough
- 1909–1910: Sir Robert Cunliffe Low

==== Captain of the Honourable Corps of Gentlemen-at-Arms ====
- 1901–1905: Henry, Lord Belper
- 1905–1907: William Lygon, 7th Earl Beauchamp
- 1907–1910:Thomas Denman, 3rd Baron Denman

==== Captain of the Yeomen of the King's Guard ====
- 1901–1905: William Frederick, Earl Waldegrave
- 1905–1907: William Montagu, 9th Duke of Manchester
- 1907–1910: Wentworth Beaumont, 2nd Baron Allendale

=== Department of the Master of the Horse ===
Royal Mews, Buckingham Palace

==== Master of the Horse ====
- 1901–1905: William Cavendish-Bentinck, 6th Duke of Portland
- 1905–1907: Osbert Molyneux, 6th Earl of Sefton
- 1907–1910: Bernard Forbes, 8th Earl of Granard

==== Honorary Equerries to the King ====
- 1901–1904: General Alexander Hood, 1st Viscount Bridport
- 1901–1910: General Augustus FitzRoy, 7th Duke of Grafton

==== Crown Equerry to the King ====
- 1901–1910: Sir Henry Ewart, 1st Baronet

==== Equerries in Waiting to the King ====
- 1901–1908: Major-General Sir Stanley Calvert Clarke
- 1901–1902: Lieutenant-Colonel Sir William Carington
- 1901–1910: Lieutenant-Colonel Sir Arthur Davidson
- 1901–1910: Lieutenant-Colonel Sir Sir Henry Legge
- 1901–1910: Captain Sir Seymour Fortescue
- 1901–1910: Captain Sir George Holford
- 1901–1910: Captain Sir Frederick Ponsonby (later Baron Sysonby)
- 1902–1910: Honourable John Hubert Ward
- 1908–1910: Colonel Henry Streatfeild

==== Extra Equerries to the King ====
- 1901: Lieutenant-Colonel Robert Loyd-Lindsay, 1st Baron Wantage
- 1901–1902: Lieutenant-Colonel Sir Robert Kingscote
- 1901–1904: Major-General Sir John Carstairs McNeill
- 1901–1910: General Sir Dighton Probyn
- 1901–1909: Major-General John Cecil Russell
- 1901–1910: Lieutenant-Colonel Sir Fleetwood Edwards
- 1901–1910: Lieutenant-Colonel Sir Arthur Bigge (later Baron Stamfordham)
- 1901–1910: Vice-Admiral Sir Henry F. Stephenson (Extra Naval Equerry)
- 1901–1907: Major-General Sir Arthur Ellis
- 1901–1910: Captain Alwyn Greville
- 1901–1910: Albert Edward Wilfred, Count Gleichen
- 1901–1910: Lord Marcus Beresford
- 1902–1910: Lieutenant-Colonel Sir William Carington
- 1902–1910: Lieutenant-Colonel Arthur Balfour Haig, Royal Engineers
- 1902–1910: Vice-Admiral Hedworth Lambton
- 1902–1910: Lieutenant-Colonel Sir Charles Arthur Frederick
- 1903–1910: Colonel Sir Edward Ridley Colborne Bradford, Bart.
- 1905–1908: General Sir Godfrey Clerk
- 1905–1910: Rear-Admiral Sir A. Berkeley Milne, Bart.
- 1909–1910: Rear Admiral Sir Colin R. Keppel

==== Superintendent of the Royal Mews, Buckingham Palace ====
- 1901–1910: Lieutenant Daniel Hickey, M.V.O.

==== Superintendent of the Royal Mews, Windsor Castle ====
- 1901–1910: Captain John Nicholas, M.V.O.

==== Manager of the King's Thoroughbred Stud ====
- 1901–1910: Lord Marcus Beresford

=== Medical Department ===
==== Physicians in Ordinary to His Majesty ====
- 1901–1907: Sir William Broadbent, 1st Baronet
- 1901–1910: Sir James Reid, 1st Baronet
- 1901–1910: Sir Francis Laking, 1st Baronet
- 1907–1910: Sir Richard Powell, 1st Baronet

===== Physicians Extraordinary to His Majesty =====
- 1901–1907: Sir Joseph Fayrer 1st Baronet
- 1901–1907: Sir Richard Powell, 1st Baronet
- 1901–1904: Sir Edward Henry Sieveking
- 1901–1910: Sir Felix Semon
- 1901–1902: John Lowe
- 1907–1910: Bertrand Dawson, Esq.
- 1909–1910: Sir Alan Reeve Manby

===== Physician to His Majesty's Household =====
- 1901–1910: Sir Thomas Barlow, Bart.

==== Serjeant-Surgeons in Ordinary to His Majesty ====
- 1901–1910: Joseph Lister, 1st Baron Lister
- 1902–1910: Sir Frederick Treves, 1st Baronet

===== Honorary Serjeant-Surgeons to His Majesty =====
- 1901: Sir William MacCormac, 1st Baronet
- 1901–1909: Sir Thomas Smith, 1st Baronet, of Stratford Place
- 1901–1902: Sir Frederick Treves, 1st Baronet

===== Honorary Surgeons in Ordinary to His Majesty =====
- 1901–1910: Thomas Bryant, Esq.
- 1901–1910: Alfred Downing Fripp, Esq.
- 1901–1910: Rickman John Godlee, Esq.

===== Surgeon to His Majesty's Household =====
- 1901–1904: Herbert William Allingham, Esq.
- 1904–1910: Anthony Alfred Bowlby, Esq.

==== Surgeon-Apothecary to His Majesty and Apothecary to His Majesty's Household ====
- 1901–1910: Sir Francis Laking

==== Honorary Surgeon-Oculist to His Majesty ====
- 1901–1910: George Anderson Critchett, Esq.

==== Honorary Surgeon-Dentist to His Majesty ====
- 1901–1910: Henry Bell Longhurst, Esq.

===== Dentist to His Majesty's Household =====
- 1901–1905: Edwin Thomas Truman, Esq.
- 1905–1910: Charles Edwin Truman, Esq.

==== Honorary Anaesthetist to His Majesty ====
- 1901–1910: Frederick William Hewitt, Esq.

==== Chemist and Druggist to His Majesty ====
- 1901–1910: Mr. Peter Wyatt Squire

===== Surgeons-Apothecary to His Majesty's Household at Windsor =====
- 1901–1910: William Fairbank, Esq.
- 1901–1910: William A. Ellison, Esq.

===== Surgeon-Apothecary to His Majesty's Household at Sandringham =====
- 1901–1910: Alan Reeve Manby, Esq.

==== Honorary Physicians in Ordinary to His Majesty in Scotland ====
- 1901–1907: Sir William Tennant Gairdner
- 1901–1903: George William Balfour, Esq.
- 1904–1910: Sir Thomas R. Fraser
- 1907–1908: Sir Thomas McCall Anderson
- 1908–1910: David W. Finlay, Esq.

==== Honorary Surgeons to His Majesty in Scotland ====
- 1901–1907: Patrick Heron Watson, Esq.
- 1901–1910: Alexander Ogston, Esq.
- 1908–1910: Sir William Macewen

==== Honorary Surgeon-Oculist to His Majesty in Scotland ====
- 1901–1909: Douglass Argyll Robertson, Esq.
- 1909–1910: George Andreas Berry, Esq.

==== Surgeon Apothecary to His Majesty's Household at Holyrood, Palace ====
- 1908–1910: William Black Alexander, Esq.

==== Honorary Physicians in Ordinary to His Majesty in Ireland ====
- 1901–1908: Sir John Thomas Banks
- 1901: William Moore, Esq.
- 1901–1910: Sir Francis R. Cruise, University of Dublin, Fellow and Ex-President Royal College of Physicians of Ireland (replacing Moore)
- 1908–1910: James Little, Esq.

==== Honorary Surgeons to His Majesty in Ireland ====
- 1901–1904: Sir Philip Crampton Smyly, M.D.
- 1901–1909: Sir William Thomson, M.D.
- 1910: Sir Thomas Myles

==== Honorary Surgeon-Oculist to His Majesty in Ireland ====
- 1901–1910: Charles Edward FitzGerald, Esq.

=== Chapels Royal ===
==== Dean of the Chapels Royal ====
- 1901–1910: Arthur Winnington-Ingram, Bishop of London

===== Sub-Dean of the Chapels Royal =====
- 1901–1910: Edgar Sheppard

==== Clerk of the King's Closet ====
- 1901–1903: Sir Randall Davidson, Bishop of Winchester
- 1903–1910: William Boyd Carpenter, Bishop of Ripon

===== Deputy Clerks of the Closet =====
- 1901–1903: Frederic Farrar, Dean of Canterbury
- 1901–1910: Canon John Neale Dalton
- 1901–1907: William Rowe Jolley
- 1903–1910 Edgar Sheppard

==== Domestic Chaplains ====
- 1901–1910 Philip F. Eliot (Dean of Windsor)
- 1901–1910 Frederick Hervey (Rector of Sandringham)

==== Chaplains-in-Ordinary ====
- 1901–1904 Alfred Ainger
- 1901–1910 Robinson Duckworth
- 1901–1910 John Henry Joshua Ellison, Vicar of Windsor
- 1901–1908 James Fleming
- 1901–1905 Edgar C. S. Gibson (resigned, appointed a bishop)
- 1901–1902 Charles Gore (resigned, appointed a bishop)
- 1901–1910 Frederick Hervey, Canon of Norwich and Rector of Sandringham
- 1901–1903 Robert C. Moberly
- July–September 1901 Handley Moule, Principal of Ridley Hall, Cambridge (resigned, appointed a bishop)
- 1901–1910 Thomas Teignmouth Shore
- 1901–1910 Clement Smith, Canon of Windsor and Rector of Whippingham, Isle of Wight
- 1901–1910 Leonard Francis Tyrwhitt
- 1901–1903 James Adams, V.C., Vicar of Stow Bardolph (replacing Moule)
- January–October 1902 Armitage Robinson (replacing Gore), (resigned, appointed a dean)
- 1902–1910 Augustus Jessopp, DD, Rector of Scarning, East Dereham (replacing Robinson)
- 1903–1910 Sir Francis ffolkes, 5th Baronet (replacing Moberly)
- 1903–1910 William Sanday, D.D. (replacing Adams)
- 1904–1910 Bertram Pollock (replacing Ainger), (resigned, appointed a bishop)
- 1905–1910 Mortimer Egerton Kennedy (replacing Gibson)
- 1908–1910 Frederick Percival Farrar (replacing Fleming)
- March–May 1910 Frederick Brooke Westcott, (replacing Pollock)

===== Honorary Chaplains =====
- 1901–1910 Edgar Sheppard, D.D. (Sub-Dean of the Chapels Royal)
- July–October 1901 J. W. Adams, V.C.
- 1901–1907 Frederick Cecil Alderson
- 1901–1908 Prebendary Barker (resigned on appointment as Dean of Carlisle)
- 1901–1910 E. R. Bernard
- 1901–1910 W. H. Bliss
- 1901–1905 F. B. H. Blundell
- 1901–1903 The Hon. George Bourke
- 1901–1910 A. B. Boyd-Carpenter
- 1901–1910 Erskine Clarke
- 1901–1910 J. L. Davies
- 1901–1910 William Donne
- 1901–1910 Owen Evans
- 1901–1903 Francis A. S. ffolkes
- 1901–1910 Lord Charles FitzRoy
- 1901–1902 Richard Gee, D.D.
- July–December 1901 The Hon. Douglas Hamilton Gordon
- 1901–1909 Robert Henry Hadden
- 1901–1907 Francis Holland
- 1901–1910 J. J. Hornby, D.D.
- 1901–1907 John Edward Kempe
- 1901–1903 John Fenwick Kitto
- 1901–1910 Joseph Gough McCormick, D.D.
- 1901–1910 The Hon. J. Stafford Northcote
- 1901–1910 A. L. B. Peile
- 1901–1904 H. H. Pereira
- 1901–1906 E. H. Perowne, D.D.
- 1901–1910 D. Robertson
- 1901–1910 William Sinclair, D.D.
- 1901–1910 F. M. Stopford
- 1901–1903 Henry Wace, D.D.
- 1901–1910 Edmond Warre, D.D.
- 1901–1910 Charles Wilkinson, D.D.
- 1901–1907 Alfred Henry Williams
- 1905–? Augustus Theodore Wirgman
- 1905–1910 Richard Tahourdin
- 1909–1910 Lord Rupert William Ernest Gascoyne-Cecil

==== Priests in Ordinary ====
- 1901–1909 Howard Gurney Daniell-Bainbridge
- 1901–1910 H. D. Macnamara
- 1901–1907 Harry Alsager Sheringham
- 1901–1905 Richard Tahourdin
- 1905–1910 Launcelot Jefferson Percival
- 1907–1910 Trevitt Reginald Hine-Haycock
- 1909–1910 George Grey Wilkinson

===== Deputy Priests =====
- 1905–1907 Trevitt Reginald Hine-Haycock
- 1907–1909 George Grey Wilkinson
- 1907–1910 Donald Aikin Sneath
- 1909–1910 Hugh Richard Lawrie Sheppard

===== Honorary Priests in Ordinary =====
- 1901–1910 H. Aldrich Cotton
- 1901–1910 E. W. Kempe
- 1901–1910 Edwin Price
- 1901–1902 John Swire

==== Chaplains in Ordinary to His Majesty in Scotland ====
- 1901–1908 Professor A. H. Charteris, D.D.
- 1901–1910 Donald Macleod, D.D.
- 1901–1910 James Cameron Lees, D.D.
- 1901–1910 James MacGregor, D.D.
- 1901–1910 Principal R. H. Story, D.D.
- 1901–1910 J. R. Mitford Mitchell, D.D.
- 1908–1910 S. J. Ramsay Sibbald

===== Extra Chaplain in Ordinary =====
- 1901–1910 Professor Malcolm C. Taylor, D.D.

== Household of Queen Alexandra 1901–1925 ==
=== Lords Chamberlain to the Queen ===
- 1901–1903: Charles Colville, 10th Lord Colville of Culross(Viscount Colville of Culross from 1902)
- 1903–1925: Richard Curzon, 4th Earl Howe

==== Vice-Chamberlains ====
- 1901–1922: Archibald Acheson, 4th Earl of Gosford

=== Treasurers ===
- 1901–1923: Frederick Robinson, 2nd Marquess of Ripon

=== Comptroller ===
- 1910–1924: Sir Dighton Probyn

=== Lords-in-waiting ===
- 1910–1924: Francis Knollys, 1st Baron Knollys

=== Equerries ===
- 1901–1910: John Brocklehurst (extra 1910–?)
- 1910–1922: Colonel Sir Arthur Davidson
- 1910–1925: Sir George Holford
- 1910–1925: John Hubert Ward
- 1910–1925: Henry Streatfield
- 1923–1925: Edward Seymour

==== Extra equerries ====
- 1910–?: Sir Charles Frederick

=== Private secretaries ===
- 1901–1911: Sidney Greville
- 1911–1925: Henry Streatfield

=== Mistresses of the Robes ===
- 1901–1912: Louisa Montagu-Douglas-Scott, Duchess of Buccleuch
- 1913–1925: Winifred Cavendish-Bentinck, Duchess of Portland

=== Ladies of the Bedchamber ===
- 1901–1911: Cecilia Harbord, Baroness Suffield
- 1901–1905: Edith Bulwer-Lytton, Countess of Lytton
- 1901–1925: Louisa McDonnell, Countess of Antrim
- 1901–1925: Louisa Acheson, Countess of Gosford
- 1905–1910: Maud Petty-FitzMaurice, Marchioness of Lansdowne (extra 1910–1925)
- 1907–1910: Cicely Gascoyne-Cecil, Marchioness of Salisbury (extra 1910–1925)
- 1911–1925: Cecilia Wynn Carrington, Countess Carrington (Marchioness of Lincolnshire from 1912)

==== Extra Ladies of the Bedchamber ====
- 1901–?: Helen Douglas, Countess of Morton
- 1901–?: Mary Parker, Countess of Macclesfield
- 1910–1925: Alice Stanley, Countess of Derby
- 1910–1914: Winifred Hardinge, Baroness Hardinge of Penshurst

=== Women of the Bedchamber ===
- 1901–1907: Lady Emily Kingscote
- 1901–1925: The Hon. (Elizabeth) Charlotte Knollys
- 1901–1910: Winifred Hardinge (later Lady Hardinge)
- 1901–?: Lady (Victoria) Alice Stanley

=== Maids of Honour ===
- 1901–1905: Dorothy Vivian
- 1901–1925: Violet Vivian
- 1901–1905: Mary Dyke
- 1901–?: Sylvia Edwardes
- 1905–?: Margaret Dawnay
- 1905–?: Blanche Lascelles
- 1919–?: Lucia White

=== Hon. Domestic Chaplain ===
- 1910–1921: Edgar Sheppard
- 1911: Frederic Percival Farrar
- 1911–1925: Ernest Edward Holmes
- 1911–1925: Mortimer Egerton Kennedy
- 1912–1925: Arthur Rowland Harry Grant

=== Surgeon-Apothecary ===
- 1910–1914: Sir Francis Laking
- 1914–1925: Sir Frederick Stanley Hewett

=== Surgeon in Ordinary ===
- 1910–1923: Sir Frederick Treves

=== Surgeon to the Household ===
- 1907–1925: Hugh Rigby

=== Physician Extraordinary and Surgeon Apothecary at Sandringham ===
- 1910–1925: Sir Alan Manby

=== Laryngologist ===
- 1910–1925: Sir Milsom Rees

=== Bacteriologist ===
- 1912–1925: Harold Spitta

== See also ==
- Royal Households of the United Kingdom
- Household of George V and Mary
