= List of knights commander of the Royal Victorian Order appointed by Edward VII =

The Royal Victorian Order is an order of knighthood awarded by the sovereign of the United Kingdom and several Commonwealth realms. It is granted personally by the monarch and recognises personal service to the monarchy, the Royal Household, royal family members, and the organisation of important royal events. The order was officially created and instituted on 23 April 1896 by letters patent under the Great Seal of the Realm by Queen Victoria. It was instituted with five grades, Knight Grand Cross (GCVO), Knight Commander (KCVO), Commander (CVO), Member (fourth class) and Member (fifth class), the last two of which were abbreviated to MVO. The two highest conferred the status of knighthood on holders; in 1984, the grade of Member (fourth class) was renamed Lieutenant (LVO), and holders of the fifth grade became Members. Women were not admitted until 1936; those receiving the highest two awards were styled Dames and those grades, when conferred on women, are Dame Grand Cross and Dame Commander (DCVO). The order could also be conferred on foreigners, who were typically appointed to honorary grades and were thus not entitled to the styles, such as Sir and Dame, associated with ordinary grades.

== Appointed by King Edward VII ==
The list below is ordered by date of appointment. Full names, styles, ranks and titles are given where applicable, as correct at the time of appointment to the order. Branch of service or regiment details are given in parentheses to distinguish them from offices. The offices listed are those given in the official notice, printed in the London Gazette. Where applicable, the occasion is given that was listed either with the notices or in published material elsewhere, in which case that material is cited.

- This along with a * indicates that the appointment was Honorary.

Name	Country	Date of appointment	Office	Occasion	Ref.
Maurice Holzmann CB	United Kingdom	2 February 1901	Extra Groom in Waiting to the King and Secretary to the Duchy of Cornwall		
Surgeon-General Professor Rudolf von Leuthold*	Germany	2 February 1901	Surgeon-General of the Guard Corps. Physician in attendance on the German Emperor	Queen Victoria's funeral	
Count Ernst von Wedel*	Germany	2 February 1901	Master of the Horse to the German Emperor	Queen Victoria's funeral	
Sir Richard Douglas Powell Bt MD	United Kingdom	8 March 1901	Physician Extraordinary to the King		
Sir Thomas Barlow Bt MD	United Kingdom	8 March 1901	Physician to the Household		
Sir Thomas Johnstone Lipton	United Kingdom	8 March 1901			
Major-General Henry Trotter	United Kingdom	8 March 1901	Commanding the Home District		
Vice-Admiral Pinha*	Portugal	8 March 1901	In attendance on the King of Portugal	The King of Portugal's attendance at Queen Victoria's funeral	
Count d'Arnoso*	Portugal	8 March 1901	Private Secretary to the King of Portugal	The King of Portugal's attendance at Queen Victoria's funeral	
General Reineck*	Greece	8 March 1901	In attendance on the King of Hellenes	The King of Hellenes's attendance at Queen Victoria's funeral	
Colonel Daschkoff*	Russia	8 March 1901	In attendance on the Grand Duke Michael Alexandrovitch of Russia	Grand Duke Michael Alexandrovitch's attendance at Queen Victoria's funeral	
Intendant-General Thon*	Greece	8 March 1901	In attendance on the King of Hellenes	The King of Hellenes's attendance at Queen Victoria's funeral	
Professor Rudolf Renvers*	Germany	8 March 1901	Consulting physician to the Empress Frederick of Germany	Visit of Edward VII to Cronberg	
Sir William Henry Broadbent Bt MD FRCP	United Kingdom	19 March 1901	Physician in Ordinary to the King		
Horace Brand Townsend Farquhar, 1st Baron Farquhar	United Kingdom	28 May 1901	Master of the Household		
Frederick Treves CB	United Kingdom	28 May 1901	"For services to the wounded in the South African War"		
General Count von Moltke*	Germany	28 May 1901		The sending of a deputation from the German Emperor to the King with colonial equipment for the King's inspection in May 1901	
Sir Thomas Smith Bt FRCS	United Kingdom	23 July 1901	Honorary Serjeant Surgeon to the King		
Sir Edward Walter Hamilton KCB	United Kingdom	23 July 1901	Assistant Secretary to the Treasury		
Deputy-Surgeon-General Henry Julius Blanc	United Kingdom	23 July 1901	"For medical assistance to the King (when Prince of Wales) at Cannes"		
William Henry Bennett FRCS	United Kingdom	23 July 1901	"For services rendered to the soldiers invalided home from the war in South Africa"		
Thomas Hanbury	United Kingdom	23 July 1901			
Rear-Admiral George Hugh Robert Zachariae*	Denmark	11 October 1901	(Royal Danish Navy)	Visit of the King to Copenhagen	
Frants Wilhelm Ferdinand Rosenstand*	Denmark	11 October 1901	Chamberlain and Secretary to His Majesty the King of Denmark	Visit of the King to Copenhagen	
Frederick Oliver Robinson, Earl de Grey	United Kingdom	24 December 1901	Treasurer to Her Majesty Queen Alexandra		
Lieutenant-Colonel The Hon. Henry Peregrine Carington CVO CB	United Kingdom	24 December 1901	Equerry to the King, and Comptroller and Treasurer to the Prince of Wales		
Sir Ernest Joseph Cassel	United Kingdom	24 December 1901			
Sir Donald Mackenzie Wallace	United Kingdom	24 December 1901	Attached to the Duke of York's suite as Assistant Private Secretary	Visit of the Duke of York to the colonies	
Major-General Alfred von Loewenfeld*	Germany	14 March 1902	Aide-de-Camp to the German Emperor	Visit of the Prince of Wales to Berlin	
Ernest von Röder*	Germany	14 March 1902	Chamberlain to the German Emperor	Visit of the Prince of Wales to Berlin	
Vice-Admiral Thomas Sturges Jackson	United Kingdom	14 March 1902	Superintendent of Devonport Dockyard	Visit of King Edward and Queen Alexandra to Devonport 8 March 1902	
Randall Thomas Davidson	United Kingdom	22 August 1902	Lord Bishop of Winchester		
Sir James Charles Harris CVO	United Kingdom	22 August 1902	British consul at Nice		
Vice-Admiral Henry Felix Woods	United Kingdom	22 August 1902	Aide-de-Camp to the Sultan of Turkey		
Robert Henry Hobart CB	United Kingdom	22 August 1902	Secretary to the Earl Marshal	Coronation of the King	
Baron Hermann von Eckhardtstein* CVO	Germany	9 November 1902	Councillor and First Secretary of the German Embassy	Gazetted as KCVO on 28 May 1901 in error	
Sir Joseph Cockfield Dimsdale Bt MP	United Kingdom	9 November 1902	Lord Mayor of London		
Sir John James Trevor Lawrence Bt	United Kingdom	9 November 1902	Treasurer of St Bartholomew's Hospital		
Sir Sydney Hedley Waterlow Bt	United Kingdom	9 November 1902			
General Godfrey Clerk CB	United Kingdom	9 November 1902	Groom in Waiting to the King		
Rear-Admiral Guilherme Augusto de Brito Capello*	Portugal	30 December 1902	Aide-de-Camp to the King of Portugal	Visit of the King of Portugal to Windsor Castle	
Major-General Hugh Dawnay, 8th Viscount Downe CVO CB CIE	United Kingdom	30 December 1902	"For services in South Africa"		
Sir John Williams Bt MD	United Kingdom	30 December 1902	Physician-accoucheur to the Princess of Wales		
Sir Hugh Shakespear Barnes KCSI	United Kingdom	31 March 1903	Indian Civil Service. Secretary to the Government of India, Foreign Department, Lieutenant-Governor Designate of Burmah	Duke of Connaught's tour of India	
Rear-Admiral Hermengilde de Brito Capello*	Portugal	7 April 1903	Aide-de-Camp to the King of Portugal. Attached to the King	Visit of the King to Portugal	
Rear-Admiral Francisco Joaquim Ferreira do Amaral*	Portugal	7 April 1903	President of the Royal Geographical Society, Lisbon	Visit of the King to Portugal	
Dr Manuel Augusto Pereira da Cunha*	Portugal	7 April 1903	Civil Governor of Lisbon	Visit of the King to Portugal	
Colonel Antonio Duarte e Silva CVO*	Portugal	7 April 1903	Commanding Portuguese Cavalry Regiment No. 3 of King Edward VII	Visit of the King to Portugal	
Francisco Maria de Veiga*	Portugal	7 April 1903	Police Magistrate in Charge of Police. Specially attached to the King	Visit of the King to Portugal	
Fernando Eduardo de Serpa Pimentel*	Portugal	7 April 1903	Master of the Household to the King of Portugal	Visit of the King to Portugal	
Antonio Jose d'Avila, Count d'Avila e Bolama*	Portugal	7 April 1903	Lord Mayor of Lisbon, President of the Executive Commission of the Lisbon Municipality	Visit of the King to Portugal	
Antonio Joaquim Simoes de Almeida*	Portugal	7 April 1903	President of the Commercial Association of Lisbon	Visit of the King to Portugal	
Sir Martin le Marchant Hadsley Gosselin KCMG CB	United Kingdom	7 April 1903	His Majesty's Envoy Extraordinary and Minister Plenipotentiary, Lisbon	Visit of the King to Portugal	
Cid Abderrahman ben Abdelsadok*	Morocco	13 April 1903	Governor of Fez, Special Envoy from the Sultan of Morocco	Visit of the King to Gibraltar	
Sir Arthur Nicholson Bt KCB KCIE CMG	United Kingdom	13 April 1903	His Majesty's Envoy Extraordinary and Minister Plenipotentiary, Tangier	Visit of the King to Gibraltar	
Sir Joseph Carbone GCMG	United Kingdom	21 April 1903	Chief Justice, President of the Court of Appeal, and Vice-President of the Council of Government of the Island of Malta	Visit of the King to Malta	
Pier Francesco dei Principi Corsini, Marchese di Lajatico*	Italy	30 April 1903	Crown Equerry to the King of Italy	Visit of the King to Italy	
Major-General Pio Carlo di Majo*	Italy	30 April 1903	Aide-de-Camp to the King of Italy. Attached to the King	Visit of the King to Italy	
Armand Mollard*	France	4 May 1903	Director of the Protocole	Visit of the King to Paris	
Sir Richard Mills KCB	United Kingdom	30 June 1903	Late Comptroller and Auditor-General		
Vice-Admiral Lord Charles William de la Poer Beresford CB	United Kingdom	11 August 1903	Vice-Admiral Commanding the Channel Fleet	Visit of the King to Ireland	
William Lee Plunkett, 5th Baron Plunket CVO	United Kingdom	11 August 1903	Private Secretary to the Lord Lieutenant of Ireland	Visit of the King to Ireland	
William Brownlow, 3rd Baron Lurgan	United Kingdom	11 August 1903	State Steward to the Lord Lieutenant of Ireland	Visit of the King to Ireland	
Horace Curzon Plunkett	United Kingdom	11 August 1903	Vice-President of the Department of Agriculture and Technical Instruction, Ireland	Visit of the King to Ireland	
Sir Antony Patrick MacDonnell GCSI	United Kingdom	11 August 1903	Under Secretary to the Lord Lieutenant of Ireland	Visit of the King to Ireland	
Vice-Admiral Sir Arthur Kuyvet Wilson KCB VC	United Kingdom	11 August 1903	Commander in Chief of the House Fleet	Visit of the King to Ireland	
Sir Arthur Edward Vicars CVO	United Kingdom	11 August 1903	Ulster King of Arms	Visit of the King to Ireland	
Colonel Sir Gerald Richard Dease CVO	United Kingdom	11 August 1903	Chamberlain to the Lord Lieutenant of Ireland	Visit of the King to Ireland	
Rear-Admiral Wilmot Hawksworth Fawkes CVO	United Kingdom	11 August 1903	Rear-Admiral Commanding the Cruiser Squadron	Visit of the King to Ireland	
Eduard, Count Choloniewski Myszka*	Austria-Hungary	9 October 1903	Master of the Ceremonies to the Emperor of Austria	Visit of the King to Austria	
Erich Ludwig Friedrich Christian, Count Kielmansegg*	Austria-Hungary	9 October 1903	Governor of Lower Austria	Visit of the King to Austria	
Heinrich Joseph Rudolf Gottfried, Count Luetzow zu Dey Luetzow und Seedorf*	Austria-Hungary	9 October 1903	First Under Secretary of State for Foreign Affairs, Vienna	Visit of the King to Austria	
Kajetan Mérey von Kapos-Mére*	Austria-Hungary	9 October 1903	Second Under Secretary of State for Foreign Affairs, Vienna	Visit of the King to Austria	
August Maria Rudolf Emanuel Franz, Count Bellegarde*	Austria-Hungary	9 October 1903	Master of the Household to the Emperor of Austria	Visit of the King to Austria	
Leopold, Baron von Gudenus*	Austria-Hungary	9 October 1903	Oberjaegermeister to the Emperor of Austria	Visit of the King to Austria	
Rear-Admiral Leopold Ritter von Jedina*	Austria-Hungary	9 October 1903	Attached to the King	Visit of the King to Austria	
General Lord William Frederick Ernest Seymour	United Kingdom	9 November 1903	Lieutenant of the Tower of London		
Algernon Bertram Freeman-Mitford, 1st Baron Redesdale CVO CB	United Kingdom	9 November 1903			
Lieutenant-General Arthur Lyttelton Lyttelton-Annesley	United Kingdom	9 November 1903	Colonel of the 11th (Prince Albert's Own) Hussars		
Lieutenant-Colonel John Lane Harrington CVO CB	United Kingdom	9 November 1903	British Diplomatic Agent and Consul-General to the Court of Menelik II, King of Kings of Ethiopia		
James Thomas Knowles	United Kingdom	29 December 1903	Formerly a governor of the Alexandria Trust		
Jonkheer Rudolf Everard Willen de Weede*	Netherlands	10 February 1904	Lord Chamberlain to the Queen Mother of the Netherlands	Marriage of Princess Alice of Albany and Prince Alexander of Teck	
Hugh Gough, 3rd Viscount Gough	United Kingdom	10 February 1904	His Majesty's Minister Resident at the Courts of Saxony and Saxe-Coburg-Gotha, and Chargé d'Affaires at the Court of Waldeck and Pyrmont	Marriage of Princess Alice of Albany and Prince Alexander of Teck	
Sir Robert Hawthorn Collins KCB	United Kingdom	10 February 1904	Comptroller of the Household to the Duchess of Albany	Marriage of Princess Alice of Albany and Prince Alexander of Teck	
Rear-Admiral Adolphus Augustus Frederick FitzGeorge CVO	United Kingdom	23 March 1904	Equerry to the late Duke of Cambridge	Funeral of Field Marshal the Duke of Cambridge	
Colonel Augustus Charles Frederick FitzGeorge CB	United Kingdom	23 March 1904	Private Secretary and Equerry to the late Duke of Cambridge	Funeral of Field Marshal the Duke of Cambridge	
Major-General Albert Henry Wilmot Williams	United Kingdom	23 March 1904	Equerry to the late Duke of Cambridge	Funeral of Field Marshal the Duke of Cambridge	
Julius Benedictus, Count Krag Juel Vind Frijs CVO*	Denmark	18 April 1904	Acting Master of the Horse to the King of Denmark	Visit of the King to Copenhagen	
Waldemar Olddenburg*	Denmark	18 April 1904	Over President of Copenhagen	Visit of the King to Copenhagen	
Christian Conrad Sophus, Count Danneskjold-Samsoee*	Denmark	18 April 1904	Director of the Royal Theatre	Visit of the King to Copenhagen	
Colonel Waldemar Edward Lemwigh*	Denmark	18 April 1904	Commanding Danish Life Guards	Visit of the King to Copenhagen	
Magens Christian, Count Krag Juel Vind Frijs*	Denmark	18 April 1904		Visit of the King to Copenhagen	
Eugen Petersn*	Denmark	18 April 1904	Chief Commissioner of Police, Copenhagen	Visit of the King to Copenhagen	
Sir (William) Edward Goschen KCMG	United Kingdom	18 April 1904	His Majesty's Envoy Extraordinary and Minister Plenipotentary, Copenhagen	Visit of the King to Copenhagen	
Major-General Karl Hermann Reinhard Freiherr von Rueder*	Germany	21 April 1904	Commanding 27th Cavalry Brigade	Visit of the Prince of Wales to Wuertemberg	
Sir Charles Hardinge KCMG CVO CB	United Kingdom	21 April 1904	His Majesty's Ambassador Extraordinary and Plenipotentary, St. Petersburg.		
Rear-Admiral Max Fischel*	Germany	1 July 1904	(Imperial German Navy). Admiral Superintendent of the Dockyard, Kiel	Visit of the King to Kiel	
Rear-Admiral Frederick, Count von Baudissin*	Germany	1 July 1904	(Imperial German Navy). Aide-de-Camp to the German Emperor. Attached to the King	Visit of the King to Kiel	
Heinrich von Schroeter*	Germany	1 July 1904	Head of Police, Kiel	Visit of the King to Kiel	
Colonel Maximilian George Frederick Charles von Engelbrechten*	Germany	1 July 1904	Commanding the 36th Infantry Brigade	Visit of the King to Kiel	
Rear-Admiral Sir Archibald Berkeley Milne Bt CVO ADC	United Kingdom	1 July 1904	Commanding HMY Victoria and Albert		
Hugo Alphonse Eduard Emanuel Joseph John Vanceslas, Prince von Dietrichstein zu Nikolsburg (Count Mensdorff-Pouilly) CVO*	Austria-Hungary	6 September 1904	Colonel on the General Staff and Aide-de-Camp to the Emperor of Austria		
John Ritter von Habrda CVO*	Austria-Hungary	6 September 1904	Commissioner of Police, Vienna		
Michael Arthur Bass, 1st Baron Burton	United Kingdom	11 October 1904			
John Savile, 2nd Baron Savile CVO	United Kingdom	11 October 1904			
Major-General John Leach	United Kingdom	19 October 1904	General Officer commanding Woolwich District	Inspection at Woolwich of the Royal Artillery by the King	
Major-General Sir Reginald Clare Hart VC KCB	United Kingdom	21 October 1904	General Officer Commanding Thames District	Inspection at Chatham of the Royal Engineers by the King	
Major-General Ronald Bertram Lane CVO CB	United Kingdom	9 November 1904			
Henri Charles Joseph, Marquis de Breteuil*	France	9 November 1904			
Alfred Therese Armand, Marquis du Lau d'Allemand*	France	9 November 1904			
Don Antonio Maria de Lancastre*	Portugal	21 November 1904	Physician to the King and Queen of Portugal	Visit of the King and Queen Portugal to England	
Major-General Frederick Otto Wahle*	Germany	19 October 1904	Commanding Royal Saxon Field Engineers	Visit of Prince Christian of Schleswig-Holstein to Saxony to represent the King at the funeral of His Majesty the King of Saxony	
Edward Levy-Lawson, 1st Baron Burnham	United Kingdom	30 December 1904			
Rear-Admiral William Henry May MVO	United Kingdom	30 December 1904	Lord Commissioner of the Admiralty and Comptroller of the Navy		
Richard Rivington Holmes CVO	United Kingdom	28 January 1905			
Dimitry Tzokow*	Bulgaria	8 March 1905	Diplomatic Agent of the Prince of Bulgaria at the Court of St. James's.	Visit of the Prince of Bulgaria	
George William Buchanan CVO CB	United Kingdom	8 March 1905	His Majesty's Agent and Consul-General at Sofia	Visit of the Prince of Bulgaria	
Maurice William Ewart de Bunsen CVO CB	United Kingdom	10 March 1905	His Majesty's Envoy Extraordinary and Minister Plenipotentiary at Lisbon		
Major-General Nicolas Yermoloff*	Russia	19 May 1905	Military Attaché to the Imperial Russian Embassy, London	Upon relinquishing that appointment	
Commodore Don Leopoldo Boado y Montes*	Spain	24 March 1905	(Royal Spanish Navy). Aide-de-Camp to the King of Spain		
Colonel Joaquín Milans del Bosch*	Spain	6 June 1905	Aide-de-camp to the King of Spain		
Colonel Alfred Mordaunt Egerton CVO CB	United Kingdom	15 June 1905	Comptroller and Treasurer to the Duke of Connaught	Marriage of Princess Margaret of Connaught	
Vincent Edwin Henry Corbett	United Kingdom	15 June 1905	Financial Advisor to the Government of the Khedive of Egypt.	Marriage of Princess Margaret of Connaught	
Sir Jacob Wilson	United Kingdom	30 June 1905	Honorary Director of the Royal Agriculture Society of England		
Yukichi Ito*	Japan	4 July 1905	Master of the Ceremonies to the Emperor of Japan, and Master of the Household of Prince Arisugawa of Japan	Visit to England of Prince and Princess Arisugawa of Japan	
Edward George Villiers Stanley, Lord Stanley CB MP	United Kingdom	13 July 1905			
Frederick von Ruexleben*	Germany	19 July 1905	Grand Marshal of the Court of the Duke of Saxe-Coburg and Gotha	Visit of the Duke of Connaught to Coburg and Gotha, to represent the King at the Celebration of the coming of age of the Duke of Saxe-Coburg and Gotha	
Vice-Admiral Sir Arthur William Moore KCB	United Kingdom	11 August 1905	Second in Command of the Channel Fleet	Visit of the French Fleet	
Colonel Sir Robert Cranston	United Kingdom	18 September 1905	(The Queen's Rifle Volunteer Brigade, The Royal Scots (Lothian Regiment)). The Lord Provost of Edinburgh	Review by the King of the Scottish Volunteer Forces at Edinburgh	
Carl, Baron von der Recke*	Germany	11 October 1905	Comptroller to the Duke of Schleswig-Holstein-Sonderburg-Glucksburg	Visit of Prince Arthur of Connaught to Glucksburg to represent the King at the Marriage of the Duke of Saxe-Coburg an Gotha, Duke of Albany, and Princess Victoria Adelaide of Schleswig-Holstein-Sonderburg-Glucksburg	
Henry Charles Brougham, 3rd Baron Brougham and Vaux	United Kingdom	14 October 1905			
Major-General Evelyn Edward Thomas Boscawen, 7th Viscount Falmouth CB MVO	United Kingdom	9 November 1905			
Sir Felix Semon CVO	United Kingdom	9 November 1905	Physician Extraordinary to the King		
Major-General Laurence James Oliphant CVO CB	United Kingdom	9 November 1905	Commanding London District		
The Hon. Alan Johnstone CVO	United Kingdom	20 November 1905	His Majesty's Envoy Extraordinary and Minister Plenipotentiary at Copenhagen		
Arthur James Herbert CVO	United Kingdom	20 November 1905	His Majesty's Envoy Extraordinary and Minister Plenipotentiary at Christiania		
Rear-Admiral Percy Moreton Scott CVO CB	United Kingdom	10 February 1906	Inspector of Target Practice, Royal Navy	Visit of the King to Portsmouth to perform the ceremony of launching HMS Dreadnought	
Rear-Admiral Henry Deacon Barry CVO	United Kingdom	10 February 1906	Admiral Superintendent of Portsmouth Dockyard	Visit of the King to Portsmouth to perform the ceremony of launching HMS Dreadnought	
Charles Adolph Rothe*	Denmark	18 February 1906	Chamberlain to the King of Denmark	Visit of the Lord Chamberlain to Denmark to represent the King at the Funeral of King Christian IX	
Axel Vedel*	Denmark	18 February 1906	Chamberlain to the King of Denmark, and Under Secretary of State for Foreign Affairs, Denmark	Visit of the Lord Chamberlain to Denmark to represent the King at the Funeral of King Christian IX	
André Metaxas*	Greece	16 April 1906	Prefect of Corfu	Visit of the King to Corfu	
Rear-Admiral The Hon. Hedworth Lambton CVO CB	United Kingdom	16 April 1906	Extra Equerry to the King, Commanding Third Cruiser Squadron	Visit of the King to Corfu	
Major-General Jean Dimopoulo*	Greece	24 April 1906	Commanding the troops at Athens	Visit of the King to Athens	
Captain George Condouriotis*	Greece	24 April 1906	(Royal Hellenic Navy). Aide-de-Camp to the King of the Hellenes. Attached to the Prince of Wales.	Visit of the King to Athens	
Vice-Admiral Edmund Samuel Poë CVO	United Kingdom	19 March 1906	Commander-in-Chief of His Majesty's Naval Forces in the East Indies.	Visit of the Prince and Princess of Wales to India	
Frederick Robert Upcott CSI	United Kingdom	19 March 1906	Chairman, Railway Board	Visit of the Prince and Princess of Wales to India	
Steyning William Edgerley CIE	United Kingdom	19 March 1906	Indian Civil Service, Chief Secretary to the Government of Bombay and Additional Member of the Council of the Governor of Bombay for making Laws and Regulations	Visit of the Prince and Princess of Wales to India	
Major-General Beauchamp Duff CB CIE	United Kingdom	19 March 1906	Indian Army, Adjutant General of India	Visit of the Prince and Princess of Wales to India	
Harold Arthur Stuart CSI	United Kingdom	19 March 1906	Indian Civil Service, Director, Criminal Intelligence Department	Visit of the Prince and Princess of Wales to India	
Lieutenant-Colonel Richard Havelock Charles MD	United Kingdom	19 March 1906	Professor of Surgery, Medical College, Calcutta, ex-officio Surgeon to the College Hospital, and Surgeon on the Staff of the Prince of Wales	Visit of the Prince and Princess of Wales to India	
Anthony Ashley-Cooper, 9th Earl of Shaftesbury	United Kingdom	11 March 1906	Chamberlain to the Princess of Wales.	Visit of the Prince and Princess of Wales to India	
Lesley Charles Probyn	United Kingdom	15 May 1906	Member of the Council of the Prince of Wales, and Auditor of the Duchy of Cornwall.		
The Marquis Kido Takamasa*	Japan	20 February 1906	Grand Chamberlain to the Crown Prince of Japan, and Master of Ceremonies to the Emperor of Japan.	Special Mission of Prince Arthur of Connaught to Japan, to invest the Emperor of Japan with the most noble Order of the Garter	
Vice-Admiral Shichiro Kataoka*	Japan	15 March 1906	Commander-in-Chief, 1st Squadron Imperial Japanese Navy.	Special Mission of Prince Arthur of Connaught to Japan, to invest the Emperor of Japan with the most noble Order of the Garter	
Colonel Arthur Davidson CVO CB	United Kingdom	15 May 1906	Equerry, Assistant Keeper of the Privy Purse and Assistant Private Secretary to the King	Special Mission of Prince Arthur of Connaught to Japan, to invest the Emperor of Japan with the most noble Order of the Garter	
Don Rodrigo de Saavedra y Vinent Cueto y O'Neill, Marquis de Villalobar CVO*	Spain	22 May 1906	Councillor of the Spanish Embassy		
Emilio de Ojeda y Perpinan*	Spain	6 June 1906	Under Secretary of State for Foreign Affairs	Visit of the Prince of Wales to Madrid (to present the King at the marriage of the King of Spain and Princess Victoria Eugenie of Battenberg)	
George Charles Vincent Holmes CVO CB	United Kingdom	29 June 1906	Chairman of the Board of Public Works, Ireland		
Edward Richard Henry CVO CSE	United Kingdom	29 June 1906	Commissioner of the Metropolitan Police		
Rear-Admiral Urban Jacob Rasmus Borreson*	Norway	22 June 1906	Chief of the Norwegian Naval Staff. Attached to the Prince of Wales	Visit of the Prince of Wales to Trondhjem (to represent the King at the Coronation of the King of Norway)	
Major-General Otto Willim Virgin*	Sweden	18 June 1906	Commanding 1st Artillery Regiment of the Swedish Army. Attached to the Duke of Connaught	Visit of the Duke of Connaught to Sweden	
Edward George Henry Montagu, 8th Earl of Sandwich	United Kingdom	2 July 1906	Lord Lieutenant of Huntingdonshire		
Theodor, Baron von Flotow*	Germany	15 August 1906	Comptroller to Prince Frederick Charles of Hesse	Visit of the King to Kronberg	
Major-General Karl, Count von Sponeck*	Germany	20 September 1906	Master of the Horse to the Grand Duke of Baden	Visit of the Duke of Connaught to Karlsruhe (for the purpose of investing The Grand Duke of Baden with the Order of the Garter in the King's name, and of representing the King at the Celebration of the Golden Wedding of The Grand Duke and Duchess of Baden)	
William Offensandt von Beckholtz*	Germany	20 September 1906	Constable of the Palace to the Grand Duke of Baden.	Visit of the Duke of Connaught to Karlsruhe (for the purpose of investing The Grand Duke of Baden with the Order of the Garter in the King's name, and of representing the King at the Celebration of the Golden Wedding of The Grand Duke and Duchess of Baden)	
Lieutenant-General Edward Pemberton Leach VC CVO CB	United Kingdom	6 October 1906	General Officer Commanding-in-Chief, Scottish Command		
Lieutenant-General Arthur Henry Paget CVO CB	United Kingdom	2 October 1906	Commanding 1st Division, Aldershot Army Corps		
Colonel Thomas William Coke, Viscount Coke CVO CMG ADC	United Kingdom	9 November 1906	Lord Lieutenant of Norfolk		
Sir Alfred Downing Fripp CVO CB	United Kingdom	9 November 1906			
Rear-Admiral Henry Bradwardine Jackson FRS	United Kingdom	9 November 1906	A Lord Commissioner of the Admiralty and Controller of His Majesty's Navy		
Colonel Henry Knollys CVO	United Kingdom	26 November 1906	(Late Royal Artillery) Comptroller and Private Secretary to the Queen of Norway (Princess Maud of Great Britain and Ireland)		
Edouard Detaille*	France	9 February 1907	Membre de l'Institut de France		
Rear-Admiral Charles William Henry Cörper CVO*	Germany	23 February 1907	Naval Attaché to the German Embassy, London	On relinquishing that post	
Captain Don José Morgado*	Spain	9 April 1907	(Royal Spanish Navy) Commandant-General of the 2nd Division (Naval).	Visit of the King to Spain	
Captain Don Emilio Fiol y Montanez*	Spain	9 April 1907	(Royal Spanish Navy) Commandant-General of the Arsenal at Cartagena	Visit of the King to Spain	
Senor Don Manuel Ledesma y Robledo*	Spain	9 April 1907	Physician to the King of Spain	Visit of the King to Spain	
Edward Marsh Merewether CVO CMG	United Kingdom	15 April 1907	Lieutenant-Governor and Chief Secretary to Government, Malta	Visit of the King to Malta	
Saburo Baba*	Japan	7 May 1907	Grand Master of the Household of Prince Sadanaru Fushimi of Japan	Visit to England of Prince Sadanaru Fushimi of Japan (representing the Emperor of Japan)	
Captain Andreas Peter Hovgaard*	Denmark	13 June 1907	(Royal Danish Navy) Naval Aide-de-Camp to the King of Denmark	Visit to London of the King and Queen of Denmark	
Lieutenant-General Douglas Mackinnon Baillie Hamilton Cochrane, 12th Earl of Dundonald CVO CB	United Kingdom	28 June 1907	Colonel, 2nd Life Guards		
Sir Thomas George Shaughnessy	United Kingdom	28 June 1907	President of the Canadian Pacific Railway Company		
Colonel Douglas Frederick Rawdon Dawson CVO CMG	United Kingdom	28 June 1907	Comptroller in the Lord Chamberlain's Department		
General Charles Louis Raoul Marion*	France	27 June 1907	Commanding 3rd Cavalry Division, French Army		
Lloyd Tyrell-Kenyon, 4th Baron Kenyon	United Kingdom	9 July 1907			
Sir William Thomas Lewis Bt	United Kingdom	11 July 1907	Deputy-Lieutenant of Glamorganshire		
Vice-Admiral Francis Charles Bridgeman Bridgeman CVO	United Kingdom	3 August 1907	Commander-in-Chief, Home Fleet	Inspection by the King of the Home Fleet	
Rear-Admiral John Rushworth Jellicoe CVO CB	United Kingdom	3 August 1907	Director of Naval Ordnance and Torpedoes	Inspection by the King of the Home Fleet	
Commodore Count Carl August Ehrensvard*	Sweden	3 August 1907	(Royal Swedish Navy)	Visit of the Coast Squadron of the Royal Swedish Navy to Cowes.	
Lieutenant-Colonel Charles Arthur Andrew Frederick CVO	United Kingdom	9 September 1907	(Late Coldstream Guards). Master of the Household and Extra Equerry to the King		
Colonel Max von Bitter MVO*	Germany	14 August 1907	Commanding the 5th (Prince Blucher von Wahlstatt) Hussar Regiment, attached to King Edward VII	Visit by the King to Wilhelmshohe.	
Lieutenant-General Emil von Schickfus*	Germany	7 October 1907	Commanding 29th Division, German Army	Visit by the Duke of Connaught to Karlsruke (to represent the King at the Funeral of the Grand Duke of Baden).	
The Hon. Sir Richard Solomon KCB KCMG	United Kingdom	9 November 1907			
John Francis Fortescue Horner	United Kingdom	9 November 1907	A Commissioner of HM Woods, Forests and Land Revenues		
Rear-Admiral Ernest Henry Frederick Ingenohl*	Germany	12 November 1907	Commanding His Imperial Majesty's Yacht Hohenzollern	Visit to Windsor of the German Emperor and Empress	
Charles Henry John Chetwynd-Talbot, 20th Earl of Shrewsbury	United Kingdom	22 November 1907			
William Francis Henry Denison, 2nd Earl of Londesborough	United Kingdom	13 December 1907			
Malcolm Morris FRCS	United Kingdom	1 January 1908			
Count Carl Axel Baltzar Wachtmeister*	Sweden	30 January 1908	Equerry to His Majesty The King of Sweden		
Major-General Desmond Dykes Tynte O'Callaghan CVO	United Kingdom	30 January 1908	Late President of the Ordnance Board		
John Eugene Bulow Warming*	Denmark	23 April 1908	Chancellor of Copenhagen University	Visit of the King to Copenhagen.	
Charles Arthur George O'Neill Oxholm*	Denmark	23 April 1908	Chamberlain to the King of Denmark, attached to Queen Alexandra	Visit of the King to Copenhagen.	
Frederick William Henrik Pegelow*	Sweden	27 April 1908	Director-General of the Swedish State Railways	Visit of the King to Stockholm	
Theodore Hintze*	Sweden	27 April 1908	Chief Commissioner of Police	Visit of the King to Stockholm	
Colonel Charles, Baron Rosenblad*	Sweden	27 April 1908	Commanding Swedish Dragoons of the Guard. Attached to the King	Visit of the King to Stockholm	
Captain Frederick Maurice de Peyron CVO*	Sweden	27 April 1908	(Royal Swedish Navy) Chamberlain in Waiting to the Queen of Sweden. Attached to Queen Alexandra	Visit of the King to Stockholm	
Hans Aimar Mow Gronvold*	Norway	2 May 1908	Private Secretary to the King of Norway	Visit of the King to Christiania	
John Egeberg Mellbye*	Norway	2 May 1908	Attached to the King	Visit of the King to Christiania	
Vice-Admiral Constantine Niloff*	Russia	10 June 1908	Chief of Staff to the Emperor of Russia	Visit of the King to Russia	
Prince Constantine Gortchacow*	Russia	10 June 1908	Attached to Queen Alexandra.	Visit of the King to Russia	
Major-General Wladimir Deduline*	Russia	10 June 1908	Governor of the Palace	Visit of the King to Russia	
Major-General Alexander Mossoloff*	Russia	10 June 1908	Chief of the Chancery of the Ministry of the Court	Visit of the King to Russia	
Rear-Admiral Nicholas Essen*	Russia	10 June 1908	Commanding the Naval Flotilla at Reval	Visit of the King to Russia	
Rear-Admiral Alexander, Count Heiden*	Russia	10 June 1908	(Imperial Russian Navy). Attached to the King	Visit of the King to Russia	
Alexander Savinsky*	Russia	10 June 1908	Master of Ceremonies and Director of the Chancery of the Russian Foreign Office	Visit of the King to Russia	
Prince Wladimir Orloff CVO*	Russia	10 June 1908	Aide-de-Camp and Chief of the Military Cabinet to the Emperor of Russia	Visit of the King to Russia	
Colonel Ismael de Korostowetz*	Russia	10 June 1908	Governor of Estonia	Visit of the King to Russia	
Sir Edward Birkbeck Bt	United Kingdom	26 June 1908			
Rear-Admiral James Edward Clifford Goodrich MVO	United Kingdom	26 June 1908	Admiral Superintendent, and in charge of all His Majesty's Naval Establishments at Gibraltar		
Commodore Colin Richard Keppel CVO CB DSO ADC	United Kingdom	26 June 1908	Commanding His Majesty's Yachts		
Everard Alexander Hambro	United Kingdom	3 July 1908	Chairman of the Council of the Royal National Pension Fund for Nurses		
Sir Henry Charles Burdett KCB	United Kingdom	3 July 1908	Deputy-Chairman of the Council of the Royal National Pension Fund for Nurses		
Henry Ulick Lascelles, 5th Earl of Harewood ADC	United Kingdom	8 July 1908	(Colonel, Yorkshire Hussars Imperial Yeomanry), Lord Lieutenant of the West Riding of Yorkshire and city and county of York		
William Henry Grenfell, 1st Baron Desborough CVO	United Kingdom	21 July 1908			
Colonel John Hanbury-Williams CVO CMG	United Kingdom	23 July 1908	Military Secretary to the Governor-General of Canada	Visit of the Prince of Wales to Quebec	
Lieutenant-General Charles Gluckmann*	Austria-Hungary	21 August 1908	Commanding the 3rd Division, Austro-Hungarian Army	Visit of the King to Ischl	
Major-General Hermann von Colard*	Austria-Hungary	21 August 1908	Commanding the 6th Infantry Brigade, Austro-Hungarian Army	Visit of the King to Ischl	
Major-General Goro Shiba CVO CB*	Japan	23 September 1908	Military Attaché to the Imperial Japanese Embassy		
Stanislas Pokiewski-Koziell CVO*	Russia	23 September 1908	Councillor to the Imperial Russian Embassy		
Andrew Graham Murray, 1st Baron Dunedin	United Kingdom	29 September 1908	Lord Justice General and Lord President of the Court of Session, Scotland		
Simon Joseph Fraser, 14th Lord Lovat CVO CB DSO	United Kingdom	9 November 1908			
Colonel Sir James Gildes CVO CB	United Kingdom	9 November 1908	Treasurer of the Soldiers and Sailors' Families' Association		
Charles Alfred Cripps KC	United Kingdom	9 November 1908	Attorney-General to the Prince of Wales		
Baron Otto Gustave Erik Thott CVO*	Sweden	17 November 1908	Chambellan Intime de le Roi	Visit to Windsor by the King and Queen of Sweden	
Eberhard Rosenblad*	Sweden	17 November 1908	Ecuyer de la Cour	Visit to Windsor by the King and Queen of Sweden	
Francesco Paolo Tosti CVO	Italy	11 December 1908			
Humphrey Napier Sturt, 2nd Baron Alington CVO	United Kingdom	16 January 1909			
Colonel Albert Edward Wilfred, Count Gleichen CVO CB CMG DSO	United Kingdom	22 January 1909	Extra Equerry to the King, and Assistant Director of Military Operations, General Staff		
Philip Frank Eliot DD	United Kingdom	22 January 1909	Domestic Chaplain to the King, Dean of Windsor, and Registrar of the Order of the Garter		
Rear-Admiral Douglas Austin Gamble MVO	United Kingdom	23 January 1909	Naval Advisor to the Turkish Government		
Major-General Alphons, Count zu Dohns*	Germany	12 February 1909	Commanding the Cavalry Division of the Guards	Visit of the King to Berlin	
Major-General Wolf, Baron Marschall*	Germany	12 February 1909	Attached to the King	Visit of the King to Berlin	
Walter Asmus Charles Frederick Eberhard, Baron von Esebeck*	Germany	12 February 1909	Deputy Master of the Horse to the German Emperor	Visit of the King to Berlin	
Martin Charles Augustus Kirschner*	Germany	12 February 1909	Chief Burgomaster of Berlin	Visit of the King to Berlin	
Monsignor Peter Pace	United Kingdom	24 April 1909	Archbishop, Bishop of Malta	Visit of the King to Berlin	
Rear-Admiral Frederick William Fisher CVO	United Kingdom	24 April 1909	Superintendent of Malta Dockyard	Visit of the King to Malta	
Rear-Admiral George Astley Callaghan CVO CB	United Kingdom	24 April 1909	Second in Command, Mediterranean Fleet	Visit of the King to Malta	
Major-General Folliott Stuart Furneaux Stokes CVO	United Kingdom	24 April 1909	Commanding Infantry Brigade, Malta	Visit of the King to Malta	
Rear-Admiral Aristide Garelli CVO*	Italy	29 April 1909	(Royal Italian Navy). Aide-de-Camp General to the King of Italy	Visit of the King to Baia, Italy	
Thomas Denman, 3rd Baron Denman	United Kingdom	17 May 1909	Captain of the Honourable Corps of Gentleman at Arms	400th Anniversary of the foundation of the Honourable Corps of Gentlemen at Arms	
Captain David Nairne Welch CVO	United Kingdom	16 June 1909	(Royal Navy (retired))		
Major-General The Hon. Sir Frederick William Stopford KCMG CB	United Kingdom	25 June 1909	General Officers Commanding London District		
Almeric William FitzRoy CVO	United Kingdom	25 June 1909	Clerk to the Privy Council		
Major-General Douglas Haig CVO CB	United Kingdom	25 June 1909	Director of Staff Duties at Headquarters		
James Cameron Lees CVO DD	United Kingdom	25 June 1909	Chaplain in Ordinary to the King in Scotland and Dean of the Order of the Thistle		
Lieutenant-Colonel FitzRoy Augustus Talbot Clayton	United Kingdom	25 June 1909	Chairman, Royal National Lifeboat Institution		
Lieutenant-General Sir Charles John Burnett KCB	United Kingdom	6 July 1909	General Officer Commanding-in-Chief, Western Command		
Major-General Herbert Francis Eaton, 3rd Baron Cheylesmore CVO	United Kingdom	20 July 1909	Chairman of Council, National Rifle Association		
Rear-Admiral John Chaghin CVO*	Russia	5 August 1909	(Imperial Russian Navy). Commanding Imperial Yacht Standart	Visit of the Emperor and Empress of Russia	
Prince Eduard of Liechtenstein CVO*	Austria-Hungary	3 September 1909	Prefect of Marienbad	Visit of the King to Marienbad	
Gilbert John Helmer CVO*	Austria-Hungary	3 September 1909	Abbot of Tepl	Visit of the King to Marienbad	
Lieutenant-Colonel Charles George, Baron von Bronn CVO*	Austria-Hungary	3 September 1909	Equerry to His Imperial Majesty The Emperor of Austria, King of Hungary	Visit of the King to Marienbad	
Lieutenant-General Baron Sir Rudolf Charles Slatin Pasha KCMG CVO CB*	Austria-Hungary, Egypt	3 September 1909	(Egyptian Army). Inspector-General of Anglo-Egyptian Sudan	Visit of the King to Marienbad	
Lieutenant-General Robert Stephenson Smyth Baden-Powell CB	United Kingdom	12 October 1909	Commanding Northumbrian Territorial Division		
Colonel Arnold Alan Cecil Keppel, 8th Earl of Albemarle CB MVO	United Kingdom	25 October 1909	Aide-de-Camp to the King	Presentation of Colours by the King to the Norfolk Territorial Force	
Sir Savile Brinton Crossley Bt MVO	United Kingdom	9 November 1909			
Sir William Hovell Browne ffolkes Bt	United Kingdom	9 November 1909			
Arthur Herbert Church FRS	United Kingdom	9 November 1909			
Somerville Arthur Gurney	United Kingdom	9 November 1909			
Captain D. Fernando de Serpa Pimental CVO*	Portugal	16 November 1909	(Royal Portuguese Navy). Aide-de-Camp to HM The King of Portugal	Visit to Windsor of the King of Portugal	
Sir Chentung Liang-Cheng KCMG*	China	20 November 1909	Member of the Privy Council of China, and Member of the Chinese Imperial Naval Commission		
