= List of knights commander of the Royal Victorian Order appointed by Victoria =

The Royal Victorian Order is an order of knighthood awarded by the sovereign of the United Kingdom and several Commonwealth realms. It is granted personally by the monarch and recognises personal service to the monarchy, the Royal Household, royal family members, and the organisation of important royal events. The order was officially created and instituted on 23 April 1896 by letters patent under the Great Seal of the Realm by Queen Victoria. It was instituted with five grades, Knight Grand Cross (GCVO), Knight Commander (KCVO), Commander (CVO), Member (fourth class) and Member (fifth class), the last two of which were abbreviated to MVO. The two highest conferred the status of knighthood on holders; in 1984, the grade of Member (fourth class) was renamed Lieutenant (LVO), and holders of the fifth grade became Members. Women were not admitted until 1936; those receiving the highest two awards were styled Dames and those grades, when conferred on women, are Dame Grand Cross and Dame Commander (DCVO). The order could also be conferred on foreigners, who were typically appointed to honorary grades and were thus not entitled to the styles, such as Sir and Dame, associated with ordinary grades.

== Appointed by Queen Victoria ==
The list below is ordered by date of appointment. Full names, styles, ranks and titles are given where applicable, as correct at the time of appointment to the order. Branch of service or regiment details are given in parentheses to distinguish them from offices. The offices listed are those given in the official notice, printed in the London Gazette. Where applicable, the occasion is given that was listed either with the notices or in published material elsewhere, in which case that material is cited.

- This along with a * indicates that the appointment was Honorary.

Name	Country	Date of appointment	Office	Ref
François, Count Alziary de Malaussena*	France	8 May 1896	Mayor of Nice	
Colonel The Hon. William Colville	United Kingdom	25 May 1896	Her Majesty's Master of the Ceremonies	
Baron Vladimir Frederiks*	Russia	30 June 1896	Equerry to the Imperial Court and Assistant to the Minister of the Imperial Household, General Adjutant and Lieutenant-General	
Count Paul Benkendorf*	Russia	30 June 1896	Acting Master of the Household and Major-General on the Staff of the Emperor of Russia.	
Li Jingfang*	China	5 August 1896	In attendance on Li Hongzhang, the special ambassador to England from the Chinese Emperor	
Loh Feng Luh*	China	27 August 1896	First Secretary of Li Hongzhang's Special Embassy	
Sir Theodore Martin	United Kingdom	16 September 1896		
General Henry Gardiner	United Kingdom	30 January 1897	Colonel Commandant, Royal Horse Artillery, Groom in Waiting and Extra Equerry to the Queen	
Hugo, Baron von Reischach*	German Empire	28 March 1897	Master of the Household to the Empress Frederick of Germany	
Vice-Admiral Édouard Barrera*	France	26 April 1897	Commander-in-Chief and Maritime Prefect at Brest	
Captain Prince Adolphus of Teck	United Kingdom (Note: His father was naturalised as a British subject in 1864.)	30 June 1897	(1st Life Guards)	
Lieutenant-General Dudley FitzGerald-De Ros, 24th Baron De Ros	United Kingdom	30 June 1897	Late Lord in Waiting to the Queen	
Major-General Paul Methuen, 3rd Baron Methuen	United Kingdom	30 June 1897	Commanding the Home District at the Diamond Jubilee	
John Dalberg-Acton, 1st Baron Acton	United Kingdom	30 June 1897	Late Lord in Waiting to the Queen	
Montagu Lowry-Corry, 1st Baron Rowton	United Kingdom	30 June 1897		
Colonel The Hon. Henry Byng	United Kingdom	30 June 1897	Equerry to the Queen	
Major-General Sir Henry Ewart	United Kingdom	30 June 1897	Crown Equerry	
Major-General Arthur Ellis	United Kingdom	30 June 1897	Equerry to the Prince of Wales	
Major-General Stanley Clarke	United Kingdom	30 June 1897	Equerry to the Prince of Wales	
Count Albert von Mensdorff-Pouilly-Dietrichstein*	Austria-Hungary	30 June 1897		
Luitbert, Baron von Pawel-Rammingen	United Kingdom (Note: Naturalised as a British subject, 1880.)	24 August 1897		
Admiral Baron Albert Seckendorff*	German Empire	12 September 1897	Master of the Household to Henry of Prussia	
Prince Danilo Alexander*	Montenegro	5 May 1898	General in Montenegrin Army, Crown Prince of Montenegro	
Prince Eduard of Leiningen*	Germany	5 May 1898		
Gustavus, Count of Erbach-Schoenberg*	Germany	5 May 1898		
General Paul Gebhart*	France	5 May 1898	Governor of Nice. Appointed on the occasion of the visit of the Queen to Cimiez	
Gabriel Le Roux*	France	5 May 1898	Prefect of the Maritime Alps. Appointed on the occasion of the visit of the Queen to Cimiez	
Sir William MacCormac	United Kingdom	27 September 1898	President of the Royal College of Surgeons, Surgeon-in-Ordinary to the Prince of Wales. Appointed in recognition of services in connection with the recent accident to the Prince of Wales	
Sir Francis Laking	United Kingdom	27 September 1898	Surgeon-Apothecary to the Prince of Wales. Appointed in recognition of services in connection with the recent accident to the Prince of Wales	
General Alexis Hagron*	France	26 August 1898	General de Division. Appointed to mark the attendance of the Duke of Connaught at the French military manoeuvres	
Philippe Marius Crozier*	France	26 August 1898	Ministre Plenipotentiaire, Chef du Service du Protocole. Appointed to mark the attendance of the Duke of Connaught at the French military manoeuvres	
Captain Prince Francis of Teck	United Kingdom	8 December 1898	(1st Royal Dragoons)	
Second Lieutenant Prince Alexander of Teck	United Kingdom	8 December 1898	(7th (Queen's Own) Hussars)	
Rear-Admiral John Fullerton	United Kingdom	9 May 1899	In command of the Royal Yacht Victoria and Albert	
Vice-Admiral Le Comte de Maigret*	France	9 May 1899	Commandant-en-Chef, Préfet Maritime, Cherbourg. Appointed on the occasion of the visit of the Queen to Cimiez	
Carl von Strenge*	German Empire	24 June 1899	Minister of State of the Duchies of Saxe-Coburg and Gotha	
Major-General Friedrich von Scholl*	German Empire	23 November 1899	Aide-de-Camp to the German Emperor. Appointed on the occasion of the visit of the German Emperor to the Queen	
Baron Bodo von dem Knesebeck*	German Empire	23 November 1899	Deputy Master of Ceremonies to the German Emperor. Appointed on the occasion of the visit of the German Emperor to the Queen	
Hercules Rowley, 4th Baron Langford	United Kingdom	26 April 1900	Comptroller of the Household of the Lord Lieutenant of Ireland. Appointed on the occasion of the visit of the Queen to Ireland	
Sir David Harrel	United Kingdom	26 April 1900	Under-Secretary for Ireland. Appointed on the occasion of the visit of the Queen to Ireland	
Major-General Ferdinand von Arnim*	German Empire	7 May 1900	Appointed on the occasion of the visit of the Duke of York to Berlin	
Victor Spencer, 3rd Baron Churchill	United Kingdom	24 May 1900	Lord in Waiting to the Queen	
Sir Alexander Condie Stephen	United Kingdom	24 August 1900	Her Majesty's Minister Resident at Dresden and Coburg	
Geheimer Justizrath Professor Dr. Friedrich Haenel*	German Empire	20 December 1900	Professor at Kiel University	
Reginald Brett, 2nd Viscount Esher	United Kingdom	1 January 1901		

== See also ==
- List of knights commander of the Royal Victorian Order appointed by Edward VII
