= The Coronation of King Edward VII =

1907 painting by Edwin Austin Abbey

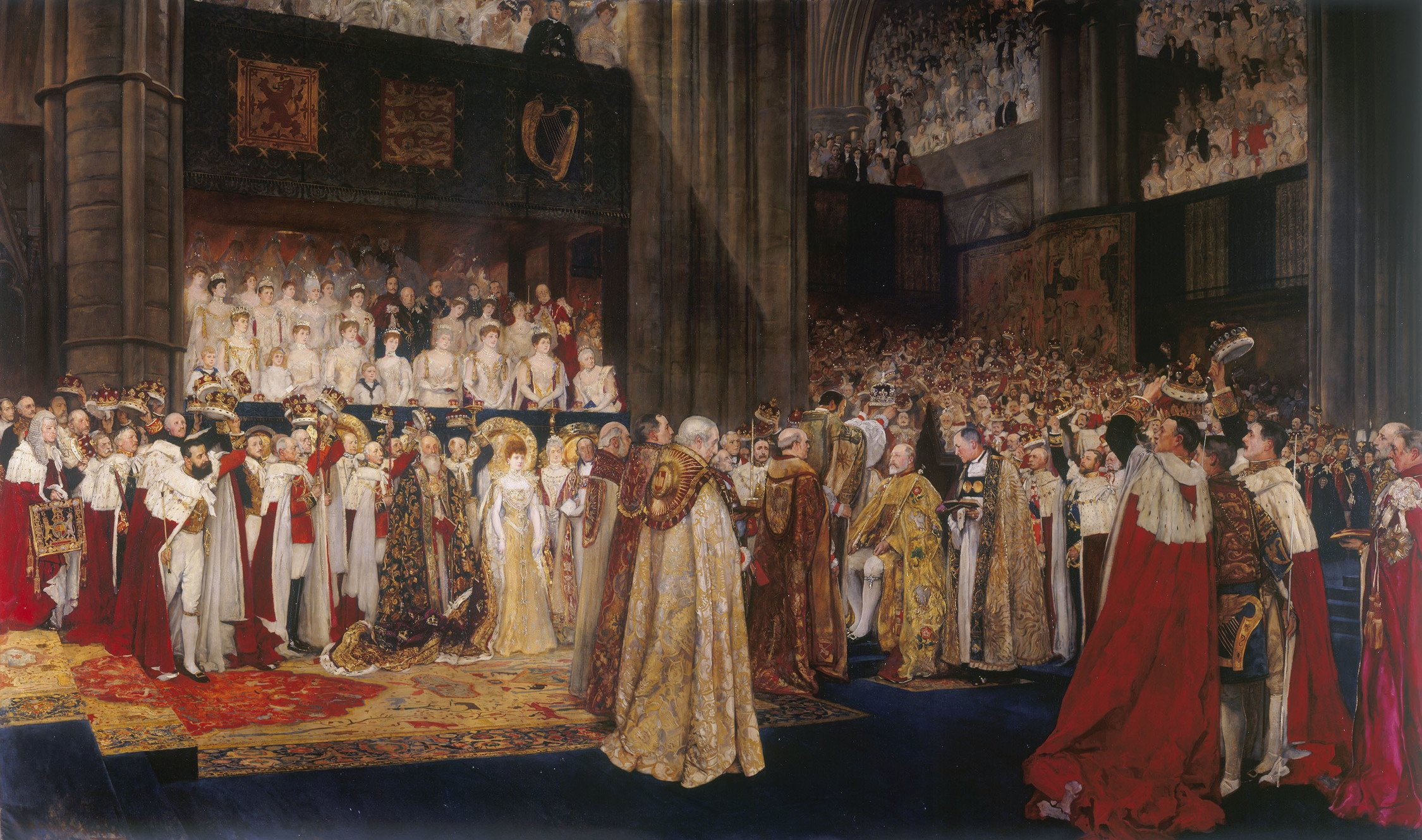
- Artist: Edwin Austin Abbey
- Year: 1902–07
- Type: Oil on canvas, historical painting
- Dimensions: 275.0 cm × 458.0 cm (108.3 in × 180.3 in)
- Location: Royal Collection, London

The Coronation of King Edward VII is a painting from 1902–07 by the American artist Edwin Austin Abbey. It depicts in oils the coronation of Edward VII at Westminster Abbey on 9 August 1902. Edward was fifty nine when he succeeded his mother Queen Victoria to the throne on 22 January 1901 and went on to reign until 1910.

John Singer Sargent had been Edward VII's first choice to execute a painting of his coronation service but he found the task too daunting and declined. In March 1901, Locket Agnew, of Thomas Agnew & Sons, suggested Edwin Austin Abbey as the official artist to produce a painting of the coronation service that would then be displayed in the United Kingdom and North America. Sir Arthur Ellis endorsed this suggestion and Abbey was given access to preparations and rehearsals in Westminster Abbey to produce sketches and studies. Worked on the portrait continued into 1907 and Abbey later declined the offer to produce a similar painting of George V's coronation.

The portrait shows the moment of crowning with the Archbishop of Canterbury raising the Imperial State Crown over the King's head. Behind the Bishop of Bath and Wells are the Prince of Wales, the Duke of Connaught and Strathearn and the Duke of Cambridge. Behind the Queen in the gallery (from left to right) are Prince Edward of Wales, the Princess of Wales, Lady Alexandra Duff, the Duchess of Fife, Princess Victoria, Prince Albert of Wales, Princess Maud, Princess Helena, the Duchess of Argyll, Princess Beatrice and Princess Augusta.
