= John Holmes (antiquary) =

English antiquarian

- Born: 17 July 1800; Deptford
- Died: 1 April 1854 (aged 53); Highgate
- Occupation: Antiquarian

John Holmes (17 July 1800 – 1 April 1854) was an English antiquarian.

== Biography ==
Holmes was the son of Nathaniel Holmes, who died at Derby on 18 December 1840, aged 78. John was born at Deptford in Kent on 17 July 1800, and brought up as a bookseller in the house of John Lepard, 108 Strand, London. He was afterwards for a short time in business at Derby on his own account. His catalogue of a collection of oriental books, and another of the Battle Abbey charters, compiled for John Cochrane, bookseller, 108 Strand, in 1830, recommended him to the notice of Lords Bexley and Glenelg, and through their interest he was, on 15 January 1830, appointed a temporary assistant in the department of manuscripts, British Museum, where he was promoted to be a senior assistant in April 1837, and was assistant-keeper from 6 May 1850 until his death. In 1840, he contributed a biographical list of the French ambassadors to England to the ‘Gentleman's Magazine,’ xiv. 483–7, 608–10; in May 1843 he sent an article on ‘Libraries and Catalogues’ to the ‘Quarterly Review,’ lxxii. 1–25, and to ‘A Relation of England, translated from the Italian,’ edited for the Camden Society by Miss Charlotte A. Sneyd in 1847, he supplied an account of the Venetian ambassadors to England. He was the adviser of Bertram, fourth earl of Ashburnham, in the formation of his famous collection of manuscripts, which was sold in 1883–4. While at the Museum, he compiled with great care catalogues of the Arundel, Burney, and other collections of manuscripts, and was at the time of his death engaged on a ‘Catalogue of the Manuscript Maps and Plans found dispersed in different collections and for the most part undescribed.’

Grave of John Holmes in Highgate Cemetery

He died at 4 Park Terrace, Highgate, on 1 April 1854 and was buried on the west side of Highgate Cemetery. His library was sold by Puttick & Simpson on 15 June 1854. He married, 8 Sept. 1832, Mary Anne, eldest daughter of Charles Rivington, bookseller, of St. Paul's Churchyard, by whom he left four children. She died at Highgate on 8 Feb. 1870 and was buried in Highgate Cemetery with her husband. The second son, Sir Richard Rivington Holmes, K.C.V.O., was royal librarian at Windsor Castle from October 1869, and keeper of the prints and drawings from 26 Feb. 1870; he retired in 1906.

Besides the works mentioned above, Holmes was author or editor of: 1. ‘A Catalogue of Manuscripts in different Languages, now selling by John Cochrane,’ 1829. 2. ‘Catalogue of the Manuscripts, Maps, Charts in the British Museum,’ 1844. 3. ‘The Life of Mrs. Godolphin. By J. Evelyn. With notes,’ 1847; another edition, 1848. 4. ‘The Life of Cardinal Wolsey. By G. Cavendish,’ 1852. 5. ‘Ecclesiastical Biography. By C. Wordsworth, with notes,’ 1853. 6. ‘Some Correspondence on the grant of 1,800l. to the National School of Highgate,’ 1853. 7. ‘A Letter explanatory of Correspondence on the grant of 1,800l. to the National School of Highgate,’ 1853.
