= Rudolf von Leuthold =

German medical officer and academic

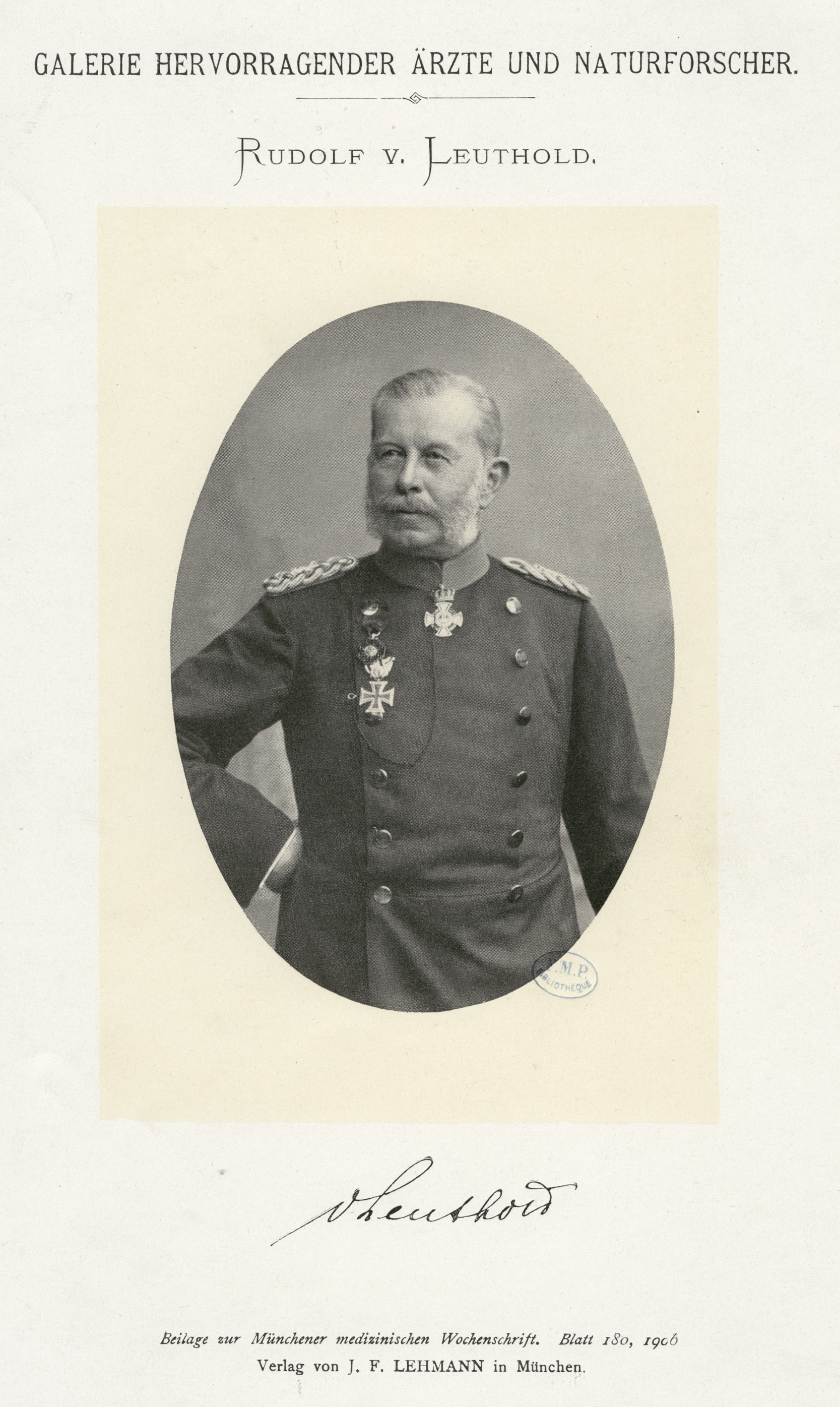
Rudolf von Leuthold

Rudolf von Leuthold (born Rudolf Leuthold; 20 February 1832 – 3 December 1905) was a German medical officer and academic.

== Life ==
Leuthold was born on 20 February 1832 at Zabeltitz near Großenhain in the Kingdom of Saxony, the son of Ernst Ferdinand (died 1839), a district forester, and his wife, Auguste Wilhelmine Rudolph, who married (after Ernst's death) a pastor from Prettin called Griesbach.

Leuthold enrolled at the Frederick William University in Berlin to study medicine and was promoted to the degree of doctor of medicine in 1856. He was then appointed a troop doctor in Mainz, before returning to his alma mater as a physician and then running the Ludwig Traube's Charité between 1864 and 1866. In the Franco-Prussian War of 1870–71, he was appointed chief physician of a field hospital and later given responsibility for a division; when the war was over, he took up a post at the Invalidenhaus Berlin and three years later served as a regimental physician. In 1879, he returned to Frederick William University as Professor of War Medicine, serving from 1879 to 1892 and he helped to treat Emperor Wilhelm I, earning his confidence and treating his son. Emperor Wilhelm II appointed him personal physician in 1888 and the following year, he was made surgeon-general of the Guard Corps. In 1901, he became surgeon-general of the Army and Chief of the Medical Corps. He held a number of other senior or honorary posts in connection with military medicine and founded the German Military Magazine in 1872 to help further knowledge and interest in the subject.

In recognition for his service, Leuthold was ennobled in 1897 and received the Grand Cross of the Red Eagle Order in 1903. In 1901, he was made an honorary Knight Commander of the Royal Victorian Order. He died on 3 December 1905 in Berlin; his wife, Elisabeth, had died in 1902 and with her he had one son and one daughter.
