= Richard Gee =

British priest (1817–1902)

Richard Gee (6 October 1817 – 14 March 1902) was an Anglican priest who was Canon of Windsor from 1894 to 1902.

== Career ==
Gee was the son of Mr. William Gee, of Mortlake, Surrey, and was born on 6 October 1817. He was educated at Wadham College, Oxford where he received his ordination in 1840, and graduated BA in 1840 and MA in 1843. His former college appointed him a Doctor of Divinity (DD) in 1867.

He had a long ecclesiastical career in Hertfordshire, where he was Vicar of Abbots Langley from 1844 to 1878. The Bishop of St Albans appointed him Honorary Canon of St Alban's Cathedral in 1865, and he served as Proctor of St. Alban's Diocese 1874–1880.

In 1878, he was appointed Vicar of New Windsor, serving as such until he was appointed Canon of Windsor by Queen Victoria in 1894. He was appointed to the fifth stall in St George's Chapel, Windsor Castle in 1894 and held this until he died in 1902. Gee was also a Chaplain in Ordinary to the Queen from 1884 until her death in 1901, Reader of the Chapel Royal, Windsor in 1878, and Warden of St. Mark's school, Windsor in 1894.

== Family ==
Gee married, in 1841, Marianne Jackson, daughter of Captain R. N. Jackson, RN. They were married for more than 60 years, and left three daughters. The eldest daughter Evelyn Gee became the wife of Sir Richard Rivington Holmes, KCVO (1835–1911), Librarian at Windsor Castle.
