= Theodore Wirgman =

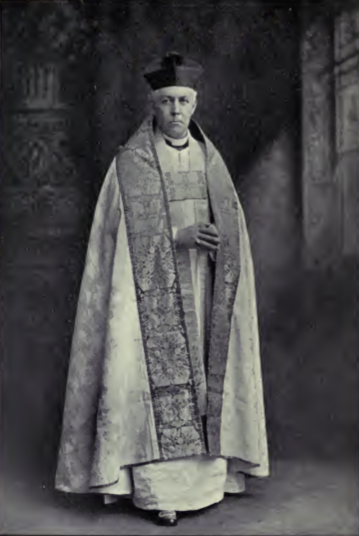
Venble A. Theodore Wirgman, D.D., D.C.L. (Archdeacon of Port Elizabeth)

Augustus Theodore Wirgman, DD (22 September 1846 – 18 October 1917) was an Anglican priest in the second half of the 19th century and the early part of the 20th, most notably Archdeacon of Port Elizabeth from 1907 until his death.

Augustus was born in Bradbourne, son of Augustus Wirgman Russell and Jane Elizabeth Pearson. He is cousin of the famous English painter Theodore Blake Wirgman and the prominent cartoonist Charles Wirgman. He was educated at Rossall School; Magdalene College, Cambridge; and the University of the Cape.

He was ordained deacon in 1870, and priest in 1871. After curacies in Hartington, Alton and Handsworth he went out to South Africa in 1873.

He was for many years the incumbent at St Mary, Port Elizabeth.

He was the author of The Blessed Virgin and All the Company of Heaven (Oxford: A. R. Mowbray & Co. Ltd, 1905; London: Cope & Fenwick, 1905; Milwaukee: The Young Churchman, 1913) and Storm and Sunshine in South Africa: With Some Personal and Historical Reminiscences
