= Herbert William Allingham =

British surgeon (1862–1904)

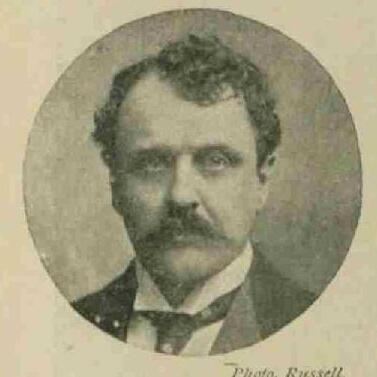
- Born: 17 April 1862
- Died: 4 November 1904 (aged 42)
- Parent(s): William Allingham

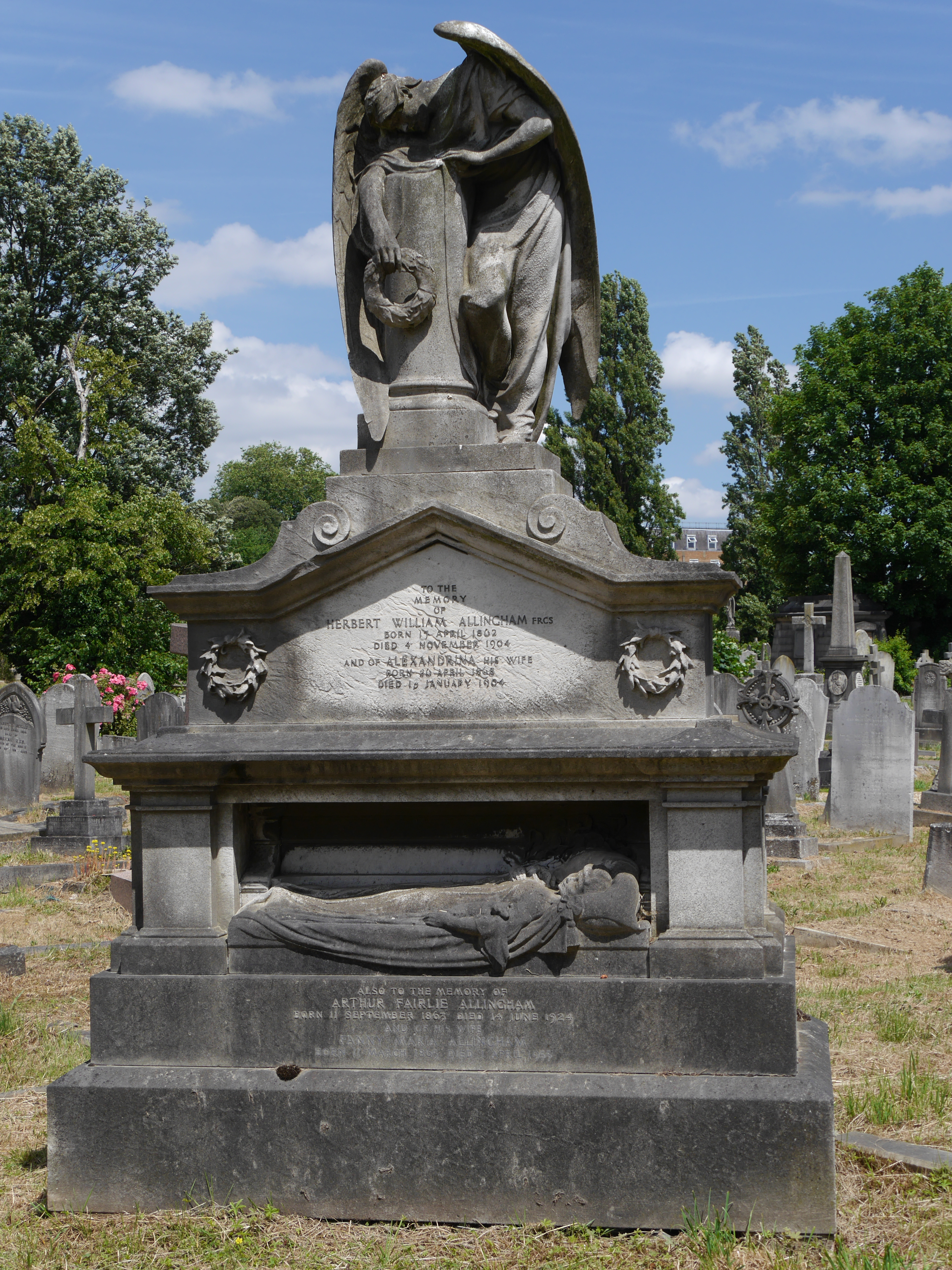
Monument, Kensal Green Cemetery

Herbert William Allingham FRCS (17 April 1862 – 4 November 1904) was a British surgeon. He was surgeon to the Household of King Edward VII, and surgeon in ordinary to the Prince of Wales (later King George V).

== Early life ==
Herbert Allingham was born on 17 April 1862, the eldest son of William Allingham, and educated at Chatham House Grammar School, Ramsgate, and University College School, London.

== Career ==
Allingham was Surgeon to the Household of King Edward VII, and then Surgeon in Ordinary to the Prince of Wales (later King George V). He was also Surgeon to the Surgical Aid Society and to the Osborne Home for Officers. In 1904, he was listed honorary medical staff at King Edward VII's Hospital for Officers.

== Personal life ==
In 1889, Allingham married Alexandrina von der Osten. She died in January 1904, after her Allingham had become inoculated with syphilis in 1903, whilst operating. After his wife's death he became depressed, and headed off to Egypt. He died in Marseille on 4 November 1904, from an overdose of morphine.

== Publications ==
- Colotomy, Inguinal, Lumbar and Transverse, for Cancer or Stricture with Ulceration of Large Intestine, 8vo, London, 1892.
- The Treatment of Internal Derangements of the Knee-joint by Operation, 8vo, illustrated, London, 1889.
- Allingham on the Diagnosis and Treatment of Diseases of the Rectum, 5th ed., London, 1888. (jointly with his father)
- Operative Surgery, 8vo, London, 1903.
