= Stanley Calvert Clarke =

British Army officer and courtier

Major-General Sir Stanley de Astel Calvert Clarke, GCVO, CMG (died 29 November 1911) was a British Army officer and courtier.

Clarke was the son of John Frederick Sales Calvert-Clarke. He was educated at the Royal Military College, Sandhurst and commissioned into the 13th Hussars. He subsequently exchanged into the 4th Queen's Own Hussars and served with the regiment in India for five years.

On 15 September 1867 he married Mary Temple Rose, daughter of Sir John Rose, 1st Baronet. He and his wife were present at the 1877 Delhi Durbar. He went on to have 5 children, Edith, Millicent, Florence, Frederick and Albert.

In 1878 Clarke, who was by this time a colonel, was appointed Equerry to the Prince of Wales and in 1886 he became Private Secretary to the Princess of Wales. He retired from the army on 20 September 1894, received the honorary rank of major-general six days later, and was invested as a Knight Commander of the Royal Victorian Order (KCVO) in 1897. After successfully taking part in the arrangements for the Coronation of King Edward VII and Queen Alexandra, he was appointed a Knight Grand Cross of the Royal Victorian Order (GCVO) two days after the ceremony, on 11 August 1902. He held the office of Clerk Marshal and Chief Equerry to Edward VII from 1 January 1904 and was Serjeant-at-Arms in the House of Lords from 1910 until he resigned in November.

== Arms ==
Coat of arms of Stanley Calvert Clarke
Notes Granted 29 March 1890 by Henry Farnham Burke, Somerset Herald. Crest A bear as in Arms gorged with a naval crown Or line reflexed over the back Gules supporting a battleaxe erect Proper. Escutcheon Gules a bear rampant ermine gorged with an eastern crown Or between three mullets pierced Argent. Motto Sans Changer
