= Felix Semon =

Laryngologist and neurobiologist

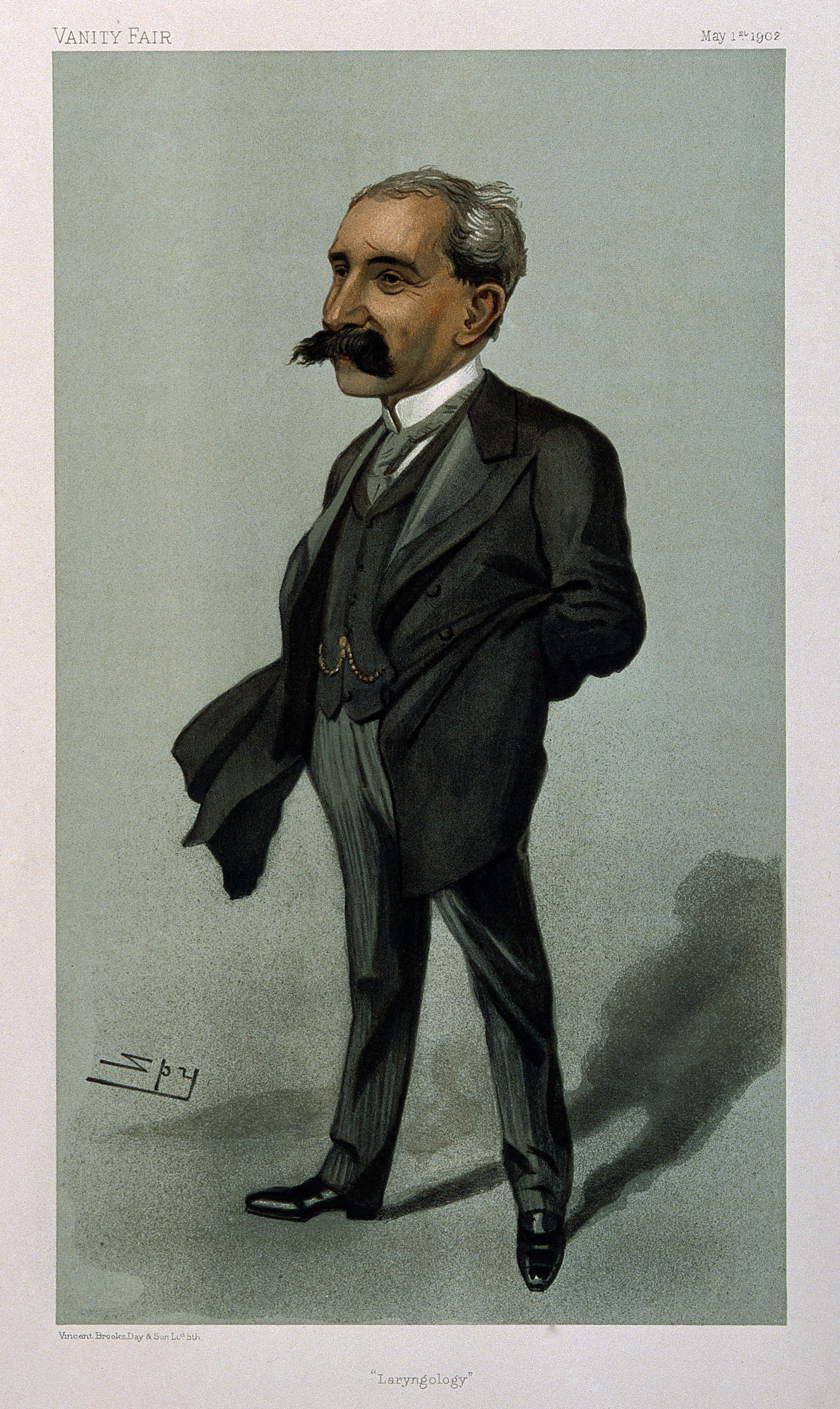
Colour lithograph of Felix Semon

Sir Felix Semon KCVO FRCP (8 December 1849 – 1 March 1921) was a German-British pioneer in neurobiology and a prominent laryngologist in the United Kingdom. He is responsible for Semon's law. He was the brother of the biologist Richard Semon.

== Biography ==
Semon was born in Danzig, Prussia, the son of Simon J. Semon, a Berlin stockbroker, and Henriette Aschenheim of Elbing. In 1868, he began his medical studies in Heidelberg and served as a volunteer during the Franco-Prussian War. Following the war, he resumed his studies in Berlin and took his medical degree in 1873. He studied in Vienna and Paris, specialising in diseases of the throat and nose.

He moved to England because of the need for a laryngologist, joining the Throat Hospital in Golden Square, Westminster. He was a member of the Royal College of Physicians in 1876 and a fellow in 1885. He joined St Thomas' Hospital in 1882 and six years later the National Hospital for Epilepsy and Paralysis in Bloomsbury. In 1894, he was elected president of the Laryngological Society. He was knighted in 1897, and appointed a Commander in the Royal Victorian Order in 1902.

In 1901, he was appointed Physician Extraordinary to King Edward VII, and was knighted KCVO in 1905.

He retired from his practice in 1911 and died a decade later in Great Missenden.
