= Maurice Holzmann =

Sir Maurice Holzmann, KCB, KCVO, ISO (born Moritz Holzmann; 28 January 1835 – 1 April 1909) was a German-born member of the British royal household who served Edward VII (as Prince of Wales and King) for 45 years. He was also a keen mountaineer actively involved with the Alpine Club.

== Early life and education ==
Moritz Holzmann was born in 1835 in Köthen in the German Duchy of Anhalt, to Victor Friedrich Holzmann and Friederika Dorothee Wilhelmine Schöner. His father was an official in the Courts of Justice. He read chemistry and medicine at the Universities at Leipzig and Heidelberg.

== Career ==
In 1859, he arrived in London and took up a position at Hofmann's laboratory, where he met the Belgian diplomat Sylvain Van de Weyer. He subsequently became Van de Weyer's private secretary, hoping that it would allow him to pursue scientific studies in his free time; but, through his position, he became acquainted with Queen Victoria's eldest son and heir apparent, Edward, Prince of Wales, and was appointed his German Secretary and Librarian in 1863. The queen later offered Holzmann the equivalent post in her household, but he refused and remained with the prince, serving in that capacity until Edward became king in 1901. He was also appointed Private Secretary to the Princess of Wales in 1870, and served in that capacity until he was given the post of Secretary and Clerk of the Council of the Duchy of Cornwall, an office he held between 1886 and 1908, having been on the Prince's Council from 1882 to his accession as King. After the Prince became King in 1901, Holzmann was made one of his extra grooms-in-waiting.

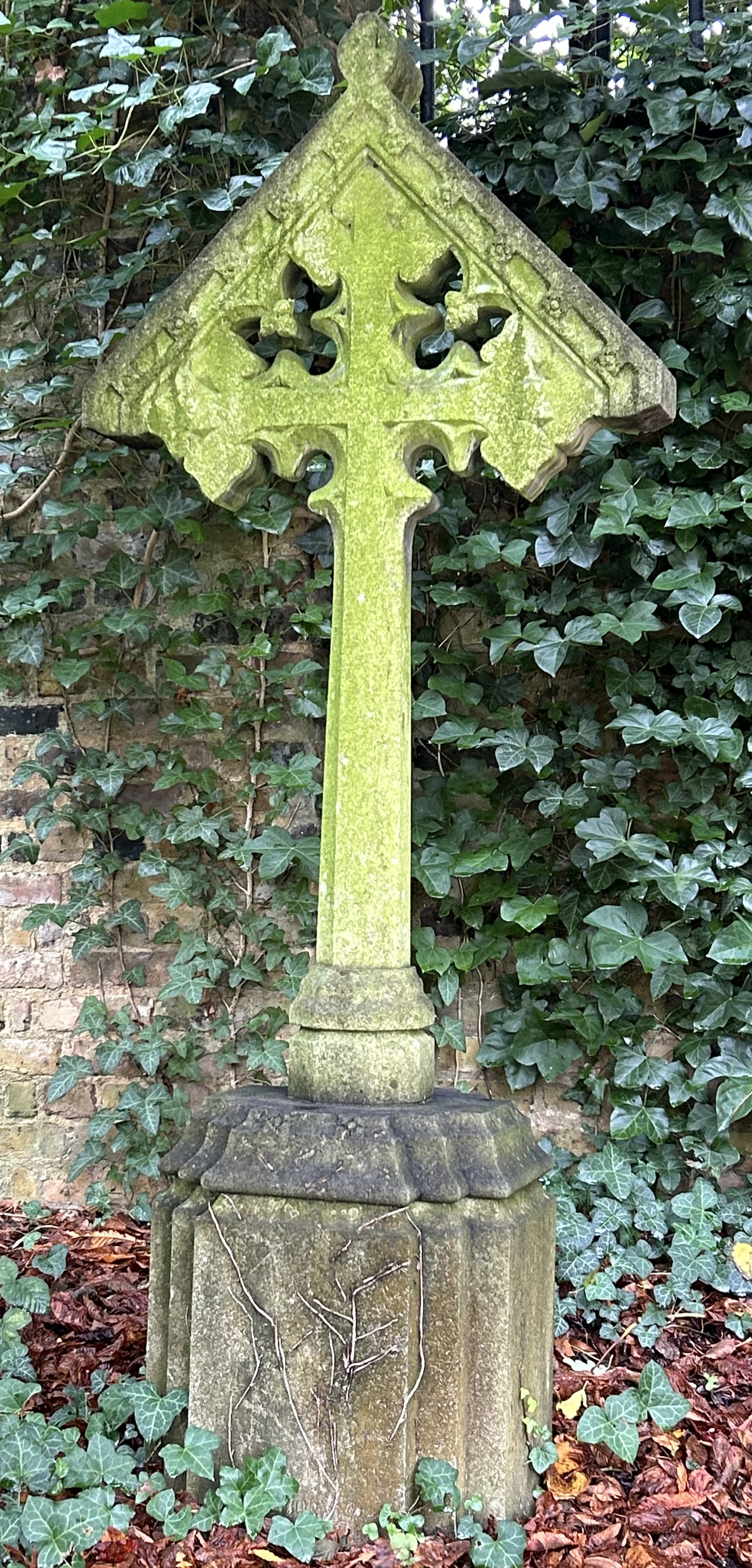
Grave of Maurice Holzmann in Highgate Cemetery

In recognition of his royal service, Holzmann received a number of state awards; in 1897, he was appointed a Companion of the Order of the Bath, and was subsequently promoted to Knight Companion; in 1901, the King appointed him a Knight Commander of the Royal Victorian Order, and in 1903 he was also given the Imperial Service Order. Outside of the court, he was a keen mountaineer; he climbed in the Eastern Alps before exploring the Cortina and Auronzo area; his notes and connections allowed him to join the Apline Club in 1874 and he subsequently contributed to The Alpine Journal. He followed this up with trips to Seewies and Cortina in 1877–81 and then the Chamonix, Zermatt and Bernese Oberland districts. Between 1884 and 1886, he sat on the Alpine Club's committee and was its Vice-President in 1887. He gave up serious mountain-climbing in 1894, aged 60, but remained in good physical health, maintained a good library on the alps and pursued coin collecting. He suffered from a "short and unexpected" illness in 1909, died on 1 April that year and was buried at Highgate Cemetery

== Likenesses ==
- Portrait by William Strange, dated April 1907; in the Royal Collection (ref. number RCIN 913725).
