= Charles Arthur Frederick =

British Army officer and courtier

Lieutenant-Colonel Sir Charles Arthur Andrew Frederick GCVO KCB (9 April 1861 – 21 December 1913) was a British Army officer and courtier. He was Master of the King's Household and an Extra Equerry to King Edward VII and to Queen Alexandra.

He was born in Torquay, Devon, son of Arthur Thomas Frederick. His family were descended from that of the Frederick baronets: Charles's great-great-grandfather Major-General Marescoe Frederick was a younger brother of Sir John Frederick, 4th Baronet.

He was commissioned a second lieutenant in the Coldstream Guards on 30 March 1881, promoted to lieutenant on 1 July 1881, to captain on 29 July 1891, and to major on 29 September 1898. After appointment to the household in 1902 he was placed on half pay, and promoted to lieutenant colonel on 4 March 1903.

As well as pursuing a military career, Frederick held several posts in the royal household. He was appointed as an extra equerry to King Edward VII on 9 November 1902, and served until the King's death in 1910, then as extra equerry to King George V and to Queen Alexandra from 1910 to 1913. He was deputy master of the household from 1901 to 1907, acting secretary of the Board of Green Cloth from 1903 to 1907 and Master of the Household from 1907 to 1912.

For his service during the Coronation of King Edward VII and Queen Alexandra, he was invested as a member (fourth class) of the Royal Victorian Order (MVO) two days after the ceremony, on 11 August 1902. He was promoted to a Commander (CVO) of the Order in the 1903 Birthday Honours list in November 1903, and later promoted to a Knight Grand Cross (GCVO).

Sir Charles died in Brighton, unmarried, of heart failure in 1913. His funeral was held on Christmas Eve in the Chapel Royal at St James's Palace and conducted by the Canon of Windsor, Edgar Sheppard.

Preceded by The Lord Farquhar	Master of the Household; 1907–1912	Succeeded by Sir Derek Keppel
