= Alexander Condie Stephen =

British diplomat and translator

Sir Alexander Condie Stephen
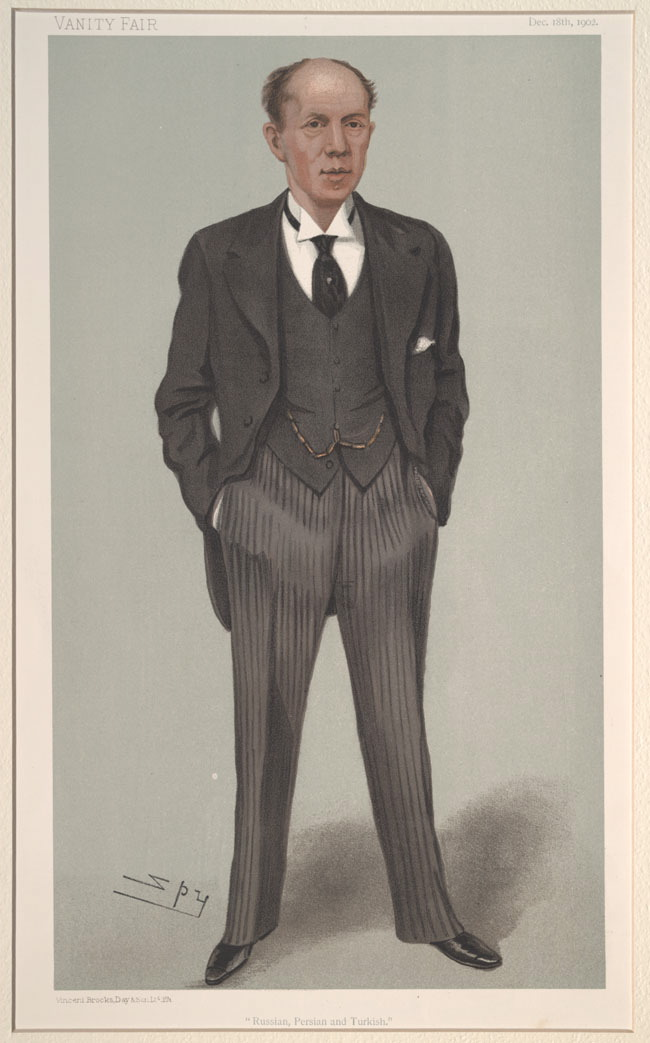
- Stephen caricatured by Spy for Vanity Fair, 1902
- Born: 20 July 1850
- Died: 10 May 1908 (aged 57)
- Occupation: British diplomat

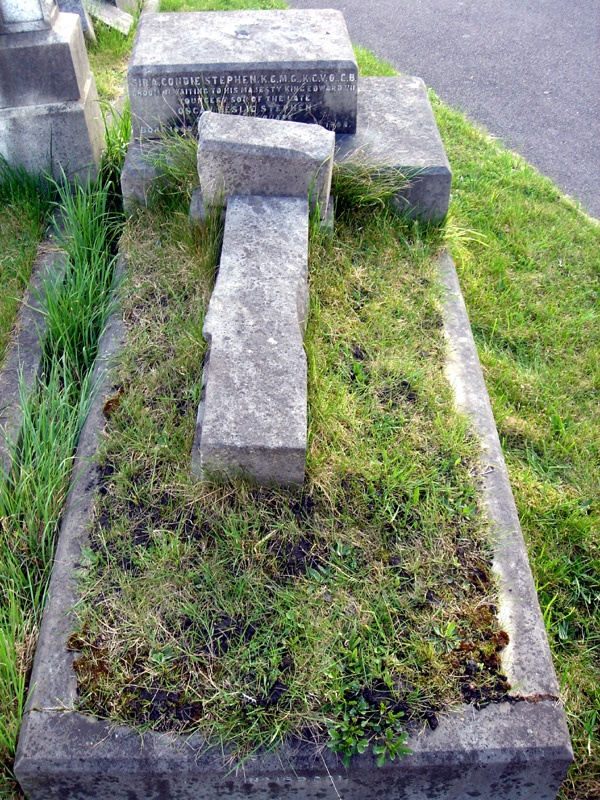
Funerary monument, Brompton Cemetery, London

Sir Alexander Condie Stephen KCMG KCVO CB (20 July 1850 – 10 May 1908) was a British diplomat and translator from Russian and Persian.

He was the first translator of Lermontov's long poem "The Demon" into English, in 1875. He translated "Fairy Tales of a Parrot" from Persian in 1880.

In 1884–5, he was Assistant Commissioner on the Afghan Boundary Commission. he had the crucial role of keeping communications open between the commission, in north-west Afghanistan and threatened by a large Russian army, and the British government in London. When the commission's presence almost triggered a war in the aftermath of the Panjdeh incident, he was sent to London to report to the government in person.

He was knighted KCVO on 24 August 1900, for being HM minister resident in Dresden and Coburg. He was Groom in Waiting to King Edward VII from 1901. Although he lived chiefly in London, he was also between 1901 and 1904 tenant of Castle House in Ludlow, Shropshire.

He was caricatured in a Vanity Fair "Spy" print on 18 December 1902, as "Russian, Persian and Turkish".

Stephen is buried in Brompton Cemetery, London.
