= Richard Rivington Holmes =

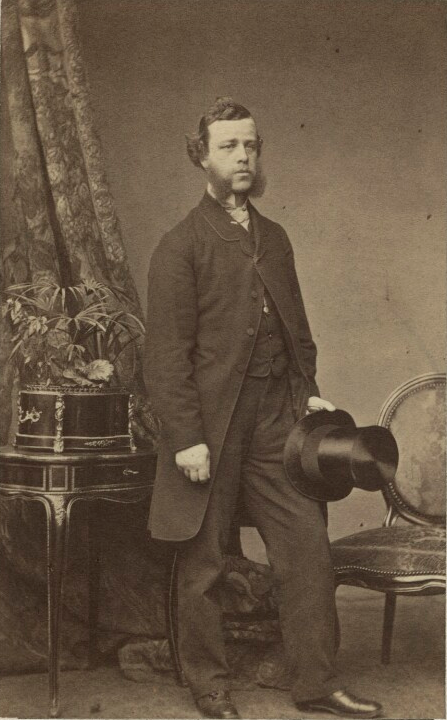
1860s carte de visite portrait

Sir Richard Rivington Holmes, KCVO (16 November 1835 – 22 March 1911) was a British archivist and courtier who was Royal Librarian at Windsor Castle from 1870 to 1905.

== Family and personal life ==
Holmes was the second son of John Holmes, antiquarian and bookseller, and his wife Mary Anne, eldest daughter of Charles Rivington of the Rivington publishing family.

In 1880, Holmes married Evelyn Gee, eldest daughter of the Reverend Richard Gee, Vicar of New Windsor and Canon of St George's Chapel, Windsor Castle.

He died in London on 22 March 1911, and was buried at Upton, Buckinghamshire.

== Ethiopian collection ==
Holmes was part of the British Expedition to Abyssinia in 1868, during which many Ethiopian documents, cultural artefacts, and art objects were looted as spoils of war by British soldiers. Holmes himself took a large cache of loot from the Battle of Magdala back to Great Britain, much of which found its way into the British Museum. The looted Kwer’ata Re’esu icon (a European painting of Christ with the crown of thorns) remained in his personal possession.

== Royal service ==
Holmes was Royal Librarian at Windsor Castle, 1870–1905. He was appointed by Queen Victoria and was reappointed by King Edward VII in 1901.

He was a lieutenant-colonel of the 1st Volunteer Battalion, Berkshire Regiment. He was appointed Knight Commander of the Royal Victorian Order in January 1905.

== Notes ==
Attribution

This article incorporates text from a publication now in the public domain: Woods, Gabriel Stanley (1912). "Holmes, Richard Rivington". In Lee, Sidney (ed.). Dictionary of National Biography (2nd supplement). London: Smith, Elder & Co.
