= Arthur Ellis (British Army officer) =

British army general (1837–1907)

Major-General Sir Arthur Ellis GCVO CSI
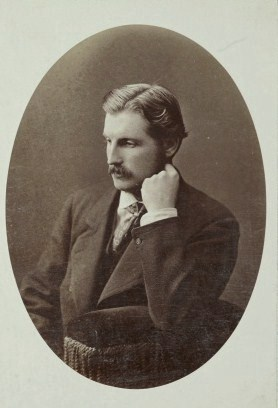
- Born: Arthur Edward Augustus Ellis; 13 December 1837
- Died: 11 June 1907 (aged 69)
- Burial place: Englefield Green Cemetery
- Military career
- Allegiance: United Kingdom
- Branch: British Army
- Rank: Major-General
- Commands: 21st Regiment of Foot; 33rd Regiment of Foot; 33rd Foot to the Grenadier Guards.
- Conflicts: Crimean War

Major-General Sir Arthur Edward Augustus Ellis, GCVO, CSI (13 December 1837 – 11 June 1907) was a British Army officer and courtier in the Household of King Edward VII and Queen Alexandra.

Ellis was the son of Hon. Augustus Frederick Ellis, the son of Charles Ellis, 1st Baron Seaford, and Mary Frances Thurlow Cunynghame. He was educated at the Royal Military College, Sandhurst and commissioned into the 21st Regiment of Foot on 11 August 1854. Ellis fought in the Crimean War between 1854 and 1856. He soon transferred to the 33rd Regiment of Foot and was promoted to captain on 17 April 1860. On 22 April 1862 Ellis transferred from the 33rd Foot to the Grenadier Guards.

In 1876, Ellis became an equerry to the Prince of Wales and was invested as a Companion of the Order of the Star of India. He was made Grand Cross of the Austrian Imperial Order of Franz Joseph in 1888. He was Sergeant at Arms in the House of Lords from 1898 to 1901. He served as an Extra Equerry and as Comptroller of Accounts in the household of Edward VII between 1901 and his death in 1907. After successfully taking part in the arrangements for King Edward′s coronation, he was invested as a Knight Grand Cross of the Royal Victorian Order (GCVO) two days after the ceremony, on 11 August 1902.

He married Mina Frances Labouchere, daughter of Henry Labouchere, 1st Baron Taunton and Frances Baring, on 2 May 1864. They had seven children:

- Evelyn Mary (d. 10 December 1934) married Capt. Walter William Kerr, grandson of Lt. Col. Lord Charles Lennox Kerr (son of the 6th Marquess of Lothian) and Adm. Sir George Elliot KCB. They had one son.
- Mary Evelyn (d. 30 August 1923) married Ralph Sneyd, grandson of Walter Sneyd MP for Castle Rising through his father Rev. Walter Sneyd. They had no known children.
- Albertha Lily Magdalen Ellis (d. 15 May 1948). Unmarried
- Alexandra Mina Ellis (d. 23 March 1949) married diplomat Sir Arthur Henry Hardinge. They had three sons, and a daughter of which only their daughter lived into adulthood.
- Dorothy Ellis (d. 3 August 1944) married Charles Kemeys-Tynte, 8th Baron Wharton. They had a son (Charles, 9th Baron Wharton), and daughter Elizabeth who married David George Arbuthnot (1905–1985), son of John Bernard Arbuthnot.
- Arthur Henry Augustus Ellis CB (13 February 1866 – 2 Jun 1934). Unmarried.
- Maj. Gerald Montagu Augustus Ellis (13 September 1872 – 29 May 1953). A veteran of the Second Boer War and the First World War, he became a Gentleman Usher and Extra Gentleman Usher to the monarchs of Britain. He was unmarried.

He is interred at Englefield Green Cemetery, near Egham, Surrey
