= Arthur Davidson (equerry) =

British equerry (1856–1922)

Colonel Sir Arthur Davidson GCVO KCB
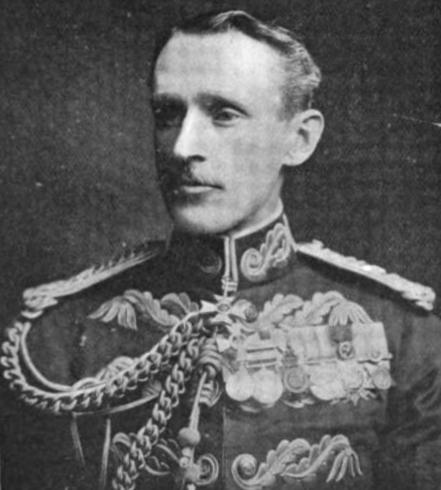

Extra Equerry to HM The King and Equerry to HM Queen Alexandra
- In office 6 May 1910 – 16 October 1922

Equerry to HM The King
- In office 22 January 1901 – 6 May 1910

Equerry to HM The Queen
- In office January 1896 – 22 January 1901

Groom in Waiting to HM The Queen
- In office 1895 – January 1896

Personal details
- Born: 12 November 1856 Shooter's Hill, Kent, England
- Died: 16 October 1922 (aged 65) Sandringham, Norfolk, England
- Occupation: Soldier, courtier

Colonel Sir Arthur Davidson, GCVO, KCB (12 November 1856 – 16 October 1922) was a British soldier and courtier.

Davidson was born in Shooter's Hill, Kent, and grew up in Welwyn, Hertfordshire. He was educated at Henley Grammar School and Bute House School, Petersham. In September 1875 he was commissioned sub-lieutenant in the 4th Foot, but a year later transferred to the 60th Rifles and was posted to the 2nd Battalion in India. Soon afterwards he was promoted lieutenant. He took part in the Second Afghan War in 1878–1880 and was appointed ADC to Lieutenant-General Sir Donald Stewart, and later to Major-General Ross. He served in the Boer War in 1881 and fought at the Battle of Tel-el-Kebir in 1882. In 1883 he was appointed Assistant Inspector of Army Signalling at Aldershot, a position he held until 1889, with the temporary rank of captain. In 1885 he was promoted substantive Captain and a month later promoted Brevet Major in belated recognition of his services in Afghanistan five years earlier. He took part in the Bechuanaland Expedition of 1885.

In 1890 Davidson was appointed ADC to Field Marshal The Duke of Cambridge. He was promoted substantive major in 1893 and lieutenant-colonel in 1895, and on the duke's resignation as commander-in-chief later the same year entered the Royal Household as Groom in Waiting in Ordinary to The Queen. He was promoted to Equerry in Ordinary in January 1896, and continued to hold the position when Edward VII acceded to the throne in 1901. He was appointed Member of the Royal Victorian Order 4th Class (MVO) in 1896, and Commander of the Royal Victorian Order (CVO) in 1901. Appointment as Companion of the Order of the Bath (CB) came in the 1902 Coronation Honours list published on 26 June 1902, and he was invested by King Edward VII at Buckingham Palace on 8 August 1902. He was promoted Brevet colonel on 23 September 1902 and retired from the Army later the same year.

He later became Assistant Keeper of the Privy Purse and Assistant Private Secretary to the King, while also remaining an equerry. In 1906 he was appointed Knight Commander of the Royal Victorian Order (KCVO). On King Edward's death in 1910 he was appointed Knight Commander of the Order of the Bath (KCB) in the Accession Honours and then appointed Extra Equerry to the new King George V and Equerry to Queen Alexandra, holding both positions until his death at Sandringham. He was appointed Knight Grand Cross of the Royal Victorian Order (GCVO) in the 1921 Birthday Honours.

Davidson is commemorated in a composition for solo bagpipes composed by clan piper to Clan Davidson, Lindsay Davidson.
