= Sir Richard Powell, 1st Baronet =

British physician

Sir Richard Powell KCVO KStJ FRCP
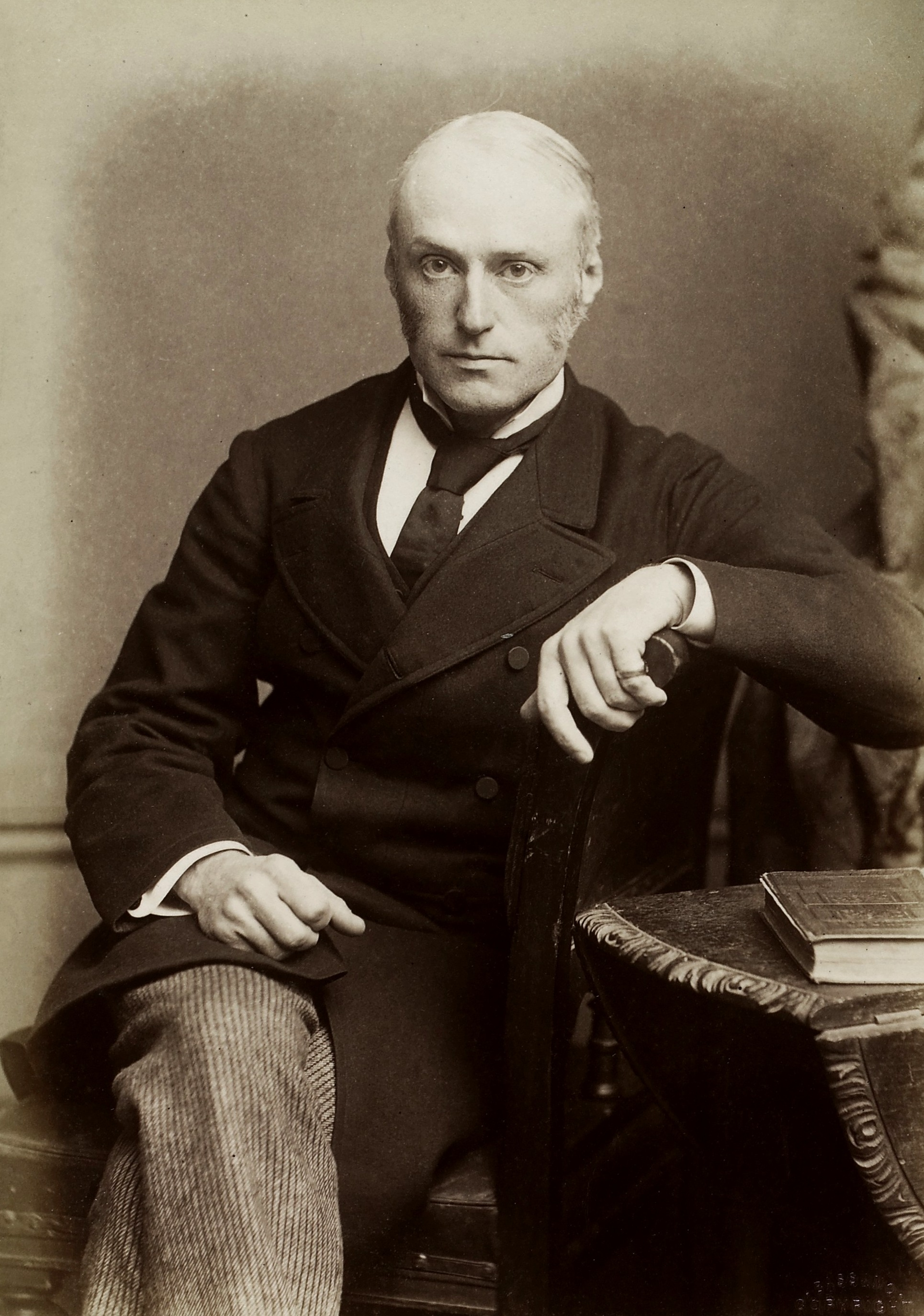
- Born: Richard Douglas Powell; 25 September 1842
- Died: 15 December 1925 (aged 83)
- Education: University College London
- Children: 1

Sir Richard Douglas Powell, 1st Baronet (25 September 1842 – 15 December 1925) was a British physician, Physician Royal to Queen Victoria, Edward VII and George V, president of various medical societies, etc.

Powell studied medicine at University College London, becoming house physician there under Dr William Jenner. He later worked at Brompton Hospital, the Marylebone Dispensary, the Evelina Hospital for Sick Children, Charing Cross Hospital and the Middlesex Hospital.

In 1887 he was appointed as physician-extraordinary to Queen Victoria, later succeeding Jenner as physician-in-ordinary to Queen Victoria, Edward VII and George V.

He was elected President of the Medical Society of London (1891), the Clinical Society of London (1899–1901), the Royal Medical and Chirurgical Society (1904–1906) and the Royal College of Physicians (1905–1909). He delivered the Harveian Oration at the Royal College of Physicians in 1914.

He was created a baronet of Wimpole Street in 1897.

== Family ==
In 1900, Powell's elder daughter Dorothy Juliet Powell married Edward Arthur Leadam, only son of W. Ward Leadam, MD.

Baronetage of the United Kingdom
New creation	Baronet (of Wimpole Street); 1897–1925	Succeeded by Douglas Powell
