= Rideau Hall =

Official residence of the Governor General of Canada

Government House
- Rideau Hall
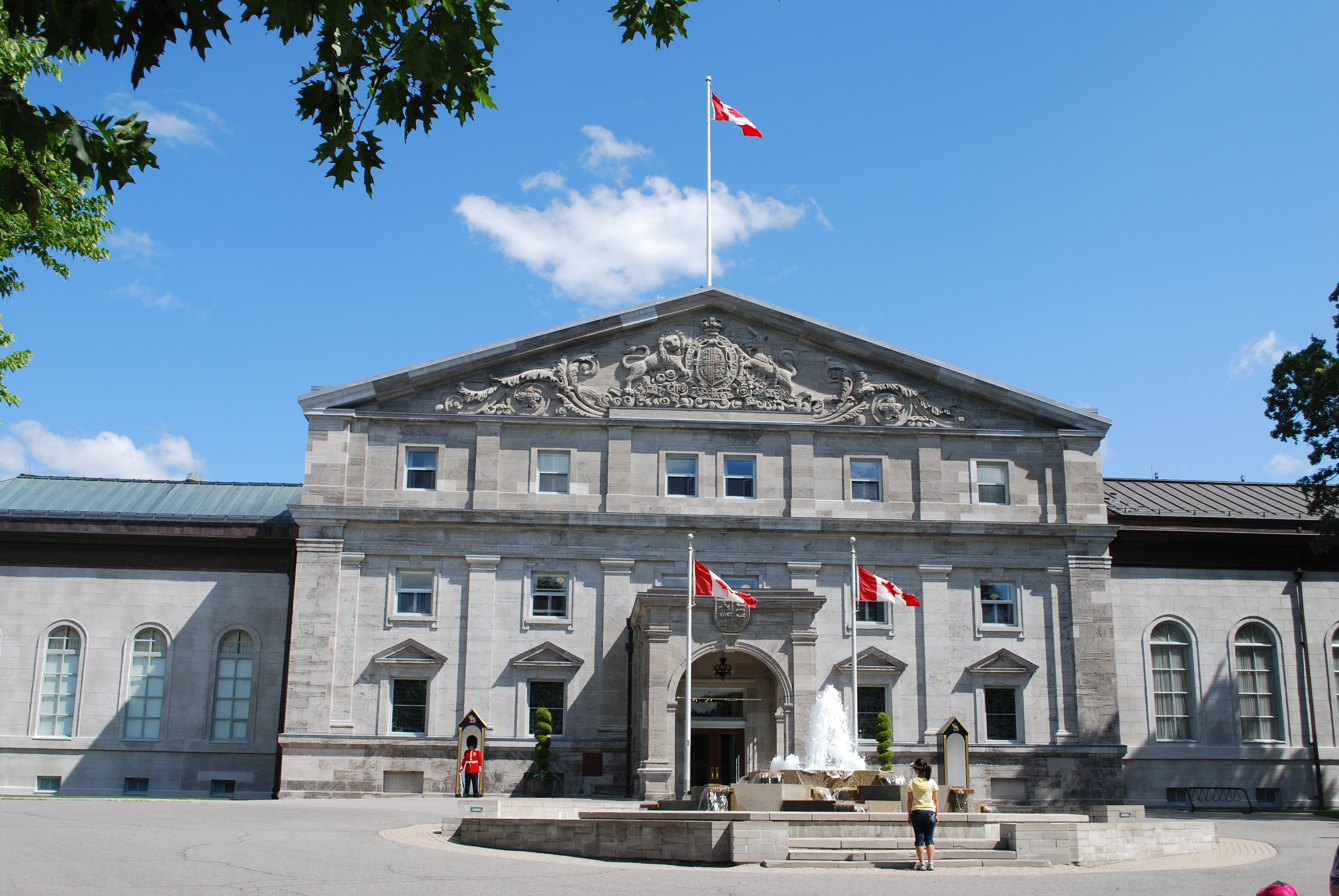
- Main façade of Government House

General information
- Architectural style: Regency, Norman Revival, Florentine Renaissance Revival
- Location: 1 Sussex Dr., Ottawa, Ontario, Canada
- Coordinates: 45.443753°N 75.685641°W
- Construction started: 1838
- Cost: $82,000 (1868)
- Client: Thomas McKay (1838), The Crown in Right of Canada (1865, 1872, 1899, 1906, 1914, 1925, 2004)
- Owner: The King in Right of Canada
- Landlord: National Capital Commission

Technical details
- Size: 9,500 m^{2} (102,000 sq ft)

Design and construction
- Architects: Thomas McKay, David Ewart, etc.

Other information
- Number of rooms: ≈ 175

National Historic Site of Canada
- Designated: 1977

Rideau Hall (officially Government House) is the official residence of the governor general of Canada, the representative of the monarch of Canada. Located in Ottawa, the capital of the country, on a 36-hectare (88-acre) estate at 1 Sussex Drive, the main building consists of approximately 175 rooms across 9,500 square metres (102,000 sq ft), and 27 outbuildings around the grounds. Rideau Hall's site lies just outside the centre of Ottawa. It is one of two official vice-regal residences maintained by the federal Crown, the other being the Citadelle of Quebec. It is also used as the official residence of the monarch of Canada, when they are in Canada.

Most of Rideau Hall is used for state affairs, only 500 square metres (5,400 sq ft) of its area are private living quarters. The rest includes the offices of the Canadian Heraldic Authority and the principal workplace of the governor general and their staff. The names term Rideau Hall and Government House are used, by metonymy, for that office and its staff. Officially received at the palace are foreign heads of state, both incoming and outgoing ambassadors and high commissioners to Canada, and Canadian Crown ministers for audiences with either the viceroy or the sovereign, should the latter be in residence. Rideau Hall is likewise the location of many Canadian award presentations and investitures, where prime ministers and other members of the federal Cabinet are sworn in, and where federal writs of election are "dropped", among other ceremonial and constitutional functions.

Rideau Hall and the surrounding grounds were designated as a National Historic Site of Canada in 1977. The house is open to the public for guided tours throughout the year; approximately 200,000 visitors tour Rideau Hall annually. Since 1934, the Federal District Commission (now the National Capital Commission) has managed the grounds.

== Name ==
The name Rideau Hall was chosen by Thomas McKay for his villa, drawing inspiration from the Rideau Canal which he had helped construct, though the house was also known colloquially as McKay's Castle. Once the house became the official residence of the governor general, it was termed formally as Government House. However, Rideau Hall stuck as the informal name, and the existence of two names for the building led to some confusion: in 1889 the viceregal consort, the Lady Stanley of Preston, was rebuked by Queen Victoria for calling the house Rideau Hall; it was to be Government House, as in all other Empire capitals. Today, however, Rideau Hall is the commonly accepted term for the house, with Government House remaining only in use for very formal or legal affairs; for example, royal proclamations will finish with the phrase: "At Our Government House, in Our City of Ottawa [...]"

== History ==
=== McKay villa ===
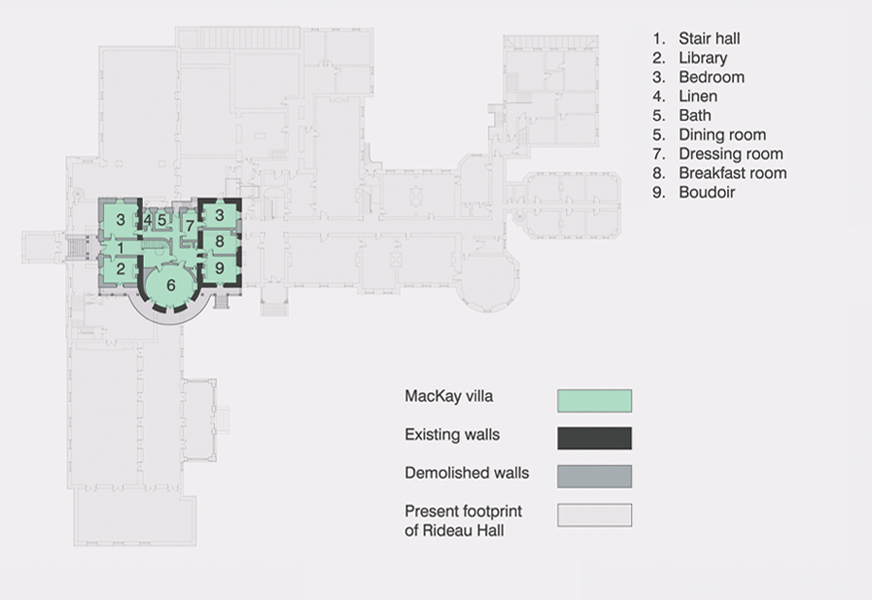
Floor plan of the original McKay villa superimposed over the present-day footprint of Rideau Hall. The building was significantly expanded after its acquisition by the Crown.

The site of Rideau Hall and the original structure were chosen and built by stonemason Thomas McKay, who immigrated from Perth, Scotland, to Montreal, Lower Canada, in 1817 and later became the main contractor involved in the construction of the Rideau Canal. Following the completion of the canal, McKay built mills at Rideau Falls, making him the founder of New Edinburgh, now a neighbourhood of Ottawa. With his newly acquired wealth, McKay purchased the 0.40 km^{2} (100-acre) site overlooking both the Ottawa and Rideau Rivers and built a stone villa, where he and his family lived until 1855 and which became the root of the present day Rideau Hall. Locals referred to the structure as McKay's Castle.

Even before the building became a viceregal residence, the hall received noted visitors, including three governors general of the Province of Canada: the Lord Sydenham, the Earl of Elgin, and Sir Edmund Head. It was said that the watercolours of Barrack Hill (now Parliament Hill) painted by the latter governor's wife, Lady Head, while she was visiting Rideau Hall, had influenced Queen Victoria to choose Bytown (now Ottawa) as the national capital. Also, on 2 September 1860, the day after he laid the cornerstone of the parliament buildings, Edward, Prince of Wales (later King Edward VII), drove through the grounds of Rideau Hall as part of his tour of the region.

=== Viceregal home ===
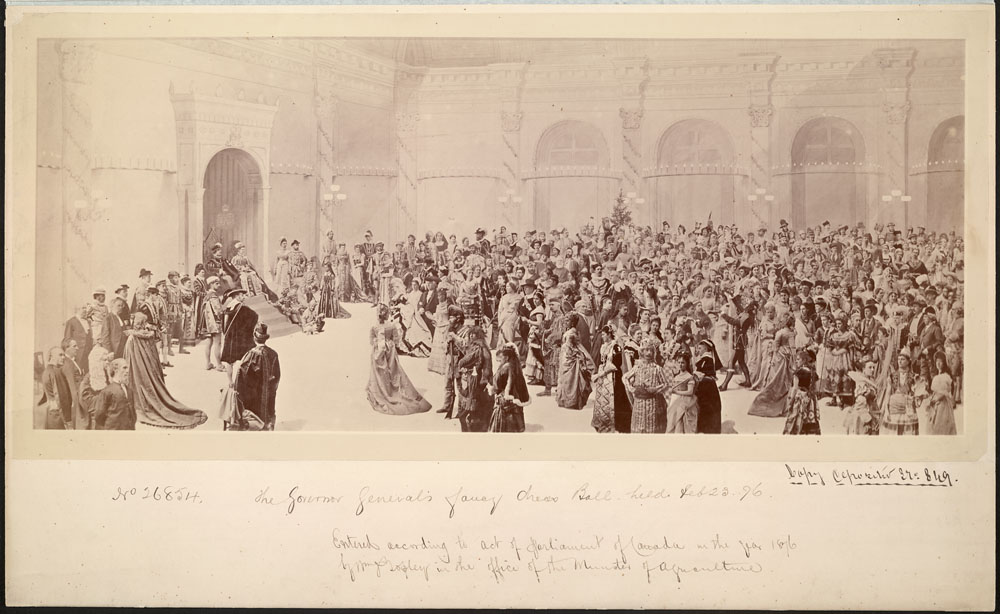
Costume ball at Rideau Hall, hosted by Governor General Lord Dufferin at Rideau Hall, 1876

After Bytown was chosen as the capital of the Province of Canada, a design competition was launched in 1859 for a new parliamentary campus. The Centre Block, departmental buildings, and a residence for the governor general were each awarded separately. The winning scheme for Government House was a Second Empire design by Toronto architects Cumberland & Storm. However, it was never built, owing to cost overruns on the construction of the parliament buildings.

In 1864, Rideau Hall was leased by the Crown from the McKay family for $4,000 per year and was intended to serve only as a temporary home for the viceroy until a proper government house could be constructed. The next year, Frederick Preston Rubidge oversaw the refinishing of the original villa and designed additions to accommodate the new functions. It was enlarged to three or four times the original size, mostly by way of a new 49-room wing, and, once complete, the first Governor General of Canada, the Viscount Monck, took residence. These additions were opposed by George Brown, who claimed that "the governor general's residence is a miserable little house, and the grounds those of an ambitious country squire." Prime Minister John A. Macdonald agreed, complaining that more had been spent on patching up Rideau Hall than could have been used to construct a new royal palace. Nonetheless, the gatehouse was enhanced by Rubidge and the entire property purchased outright in 1868 for the sum of $82,000.

Thereafter, the house became the social centre of Ottawa—even Canada—hosting foreign visitors (the first being Grand Duke Alexis, son of Emperor Alexander II of Russia), investitures, swearing-in ceremonies, balls, dinners, garden parties, children's parties, and theatrical productions in the ballroom (initiated by the Earl and Countess of Dufferin), in which members of the household and viceregal family would participate. Probably the largest event held in the ballroom was a fancy dress ball hosted by the Dufferins on the evening of 23 February 1876, which approximately 1,500 guests attended.

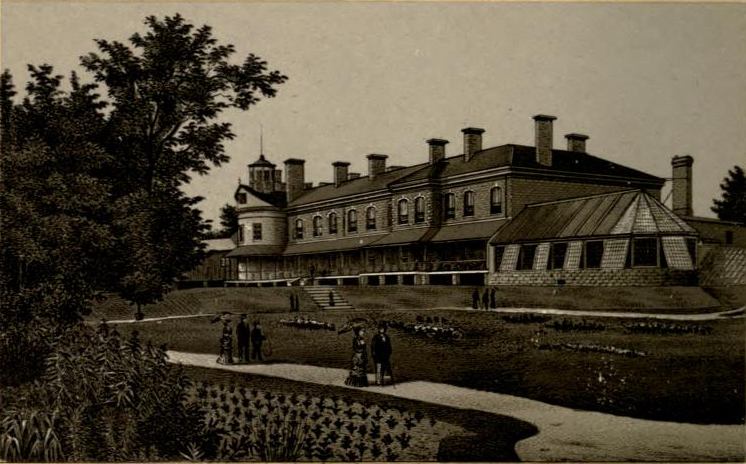
Rideau Hall from the southeast in 1884

Still, despite the popularity of the events that took place in the building, negative first impressions of Rideau Hall itself were a theme until the early part of the 20th century. Upon arrival there in 1872, the Countess of Dufferin said in her journal: "We have been so very enthusiastic about everything hitherto that the first sight of Rideau Hall did lower our spirits just a little!" In 1893, Lady Stanley, wife of Governor General the Lord Stanley of Preston, said "you will find the furniture in the rooms very old-fashioned & not very pretty [...] The red drawing room [...] had no furniture except chairs & tables [...] The walls are absolutely bare [...] The room which has always been the wife of the G.G.'s sitting room is very empty [...] There are no lamps in the house at all. No cushions, no table cloths, in fact none of the small things that make a room pretty & comfortable." Echoing these earlier comments, the Marchioness of Aberdeen and Temair said upon her departure from Ottawa that Rideau Hall was a "shabby old Government House put away amongst its clump of bushes [...]"

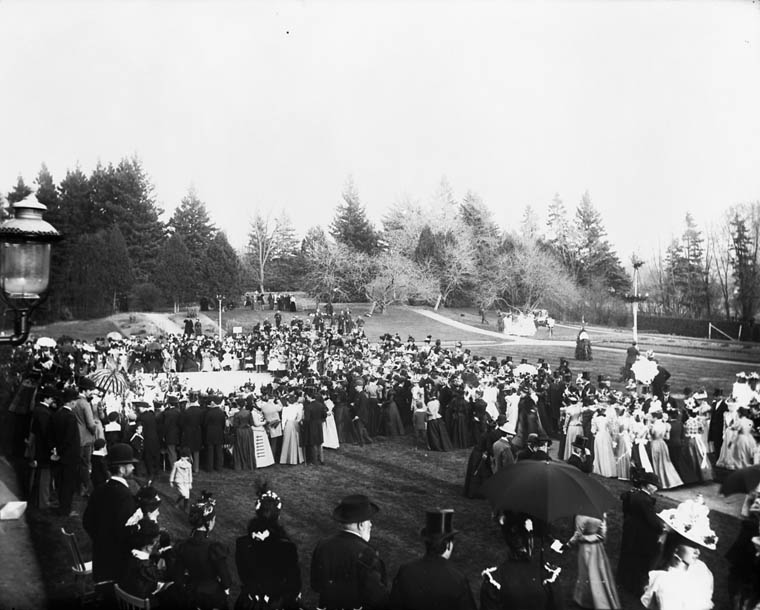
A May Day garden party at Rideau Hall, 1898

Various improvements were undertaken over the decades, seeing the first gas chandeliers and a telegraph wire put in, as well as the construction of the ballroom in the same year. By the time Rideau Hall was to live up to its role as a royal home, when its first royal residents—John Campbell, Marquess of Lorne, and his wife, Princess Louise—moved in at the beginning of 1878, many upgrades had been completed. Lorne stated of the hall: "Here we are settling down in this big and comfortable House [sic], which I tell Louise is much superior to Kensington, for the walls are thick, the rooms are lathed and plastered (which they are not at Kensington) and there is an abundant supply of heat and light." The princess was not long in Rideau Hall before Fenians posed themselves as a threat to her life and she was ushered back to the UK for both rest and protection. When she returned in 1880, with the Queen greatly concerned for her daughter's safety, it was felt necessary to post extra guards around the grounds of the hall.

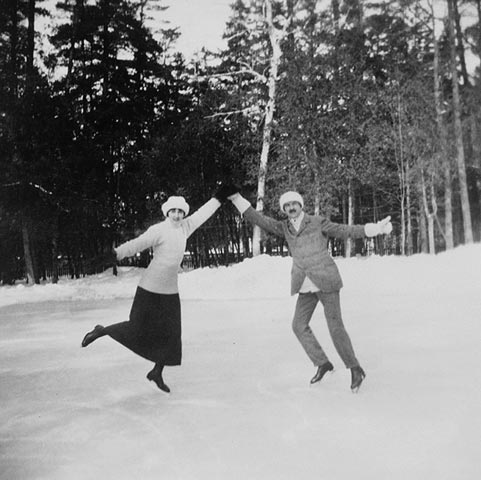
Princess Patricia of Connaught and Major Worthington at Rideau Hall's skating rink, 1914

Thereafter, members of the royal family would stay periodically at Rideau Hall, if not as governor general then as guests of the Crown, so that the palace played host to Prince Leopold (later also Duke of Albany) in 1880; Prince George (later King George V) in 1882, 1901, and 1908; Prince Arthur, Duke of Connaught, and Princess Louise, Duchess of Connaught (later also the Duke and Duchess of Strathearn), in 1890 and as the viceregal couple from 1906 to 1912; Princess Louise in 1900; Princess Patricia with her parents from 1906 to 1912; Prince Albert (later King George VI) in 1910 and 1913; Edward, Prince of Wales (later King Edward VIII), in 1919, 1923, 1924, and 1927; Prince George (later also Duke of Kent) in 1926 and 1927; and Prince Henry, Duke of Gloucester, in 1929.

A member of the royal family, the Duke of Connaught and Strathearn (grandson of Prince Arthur, Duke of Connaught and Strathearn), lost his life on the grounds of Rideau Hall. Theo Aronson, in his 1981 biography of Princess Alice, Countess of Athlone, simply stated that the Duke "was found dead on the floor of his room at Rideau Hall on the morning of 26 April 1943. He had died, apparently, from hypothermia." The diaries of Sir Alan Lascelles, King George VI's private secretary, published in 2006, recorded that both the regiment and Athlone had rejected him as incompetent, and he fell out of a window when drunk and perished of hypothermia overnight.

=== Second World War ===
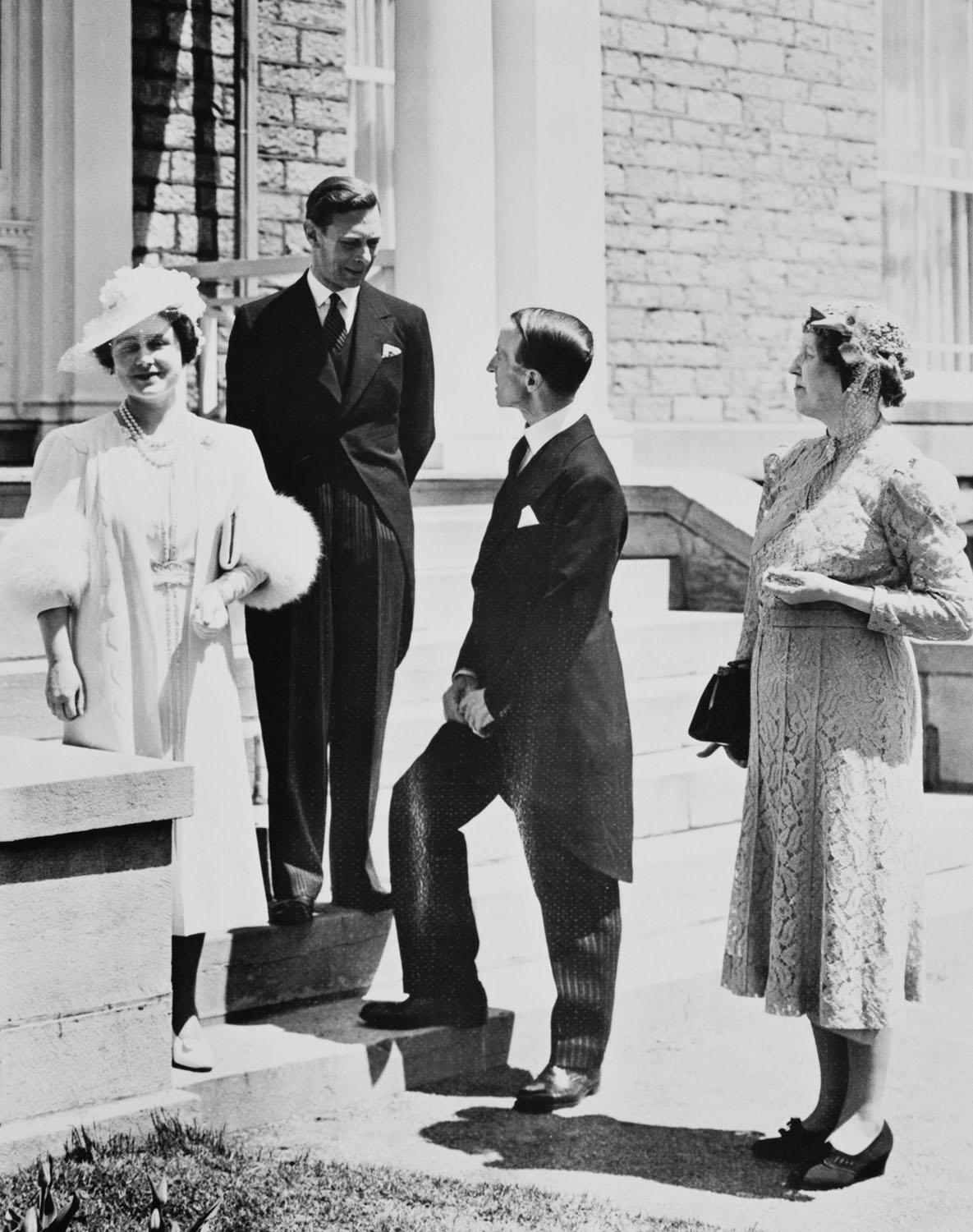
Left to right: Queen Elizabeth, King George VI, Governor General the Lord Tweedsmuir, and the Lady Tweedsmuir at Rideau Hall on 20 May 1939

When King George VI and his consort, Queen Elizabeth, arrived at Rideau Hall on 19 May 1939, during their first royal tour of Canada, official royal tour historian Gustave Lanctot stated: "When Their Majesties walked into their Canadian residence, the Statute of Westminster had assumed full reality: the King of Canada had come home." The King, while there, became the first monarch of Canada to personally receive the credentials of an ambassador, that being Daniel Calhoun Roper as the representative of the United States. It was thought for a time, after the outbreak of the Second World War, that the King, Queen, and their two daughters—Princesses Elizabeth and Margaret—would move permanently to Canada for the duration of the conflict in Europe; though, Hatley Castle, in Colwood, British Columbia, was purchased by the King in Right of Canada for this purpose, instead of using Rideau Hall. However, it was decided that the royal family leaving the United Kingdom at a time of war would be a major blow to morale and they remained in Britain.

During the war, the palace became the home in exile of a number of royals displaced by the invasions of their respective countries back in Europe. Among the royal guests were Crown Prince Olav (later King Olav V) and Crown Princess Märtha of Norway; Grand Duchess Charlotte and Prince Felix of Luxembourg; King Peter II of Yugoslavia; King George II of Greece; Empress Zita of Austria and her daughters; as well as Queen Wilhelmina of the Netherlands, her daughter, Princess Juliana (later Queen Juliana), and granddaughters, Princesses Beatrix (later Queen Beatrix), Irene, and Margriet. Though the resident governor general's wife, Princess Alice, Countess of Athlone, could do little to add her personal touch to Rideau Hall, due to rationing and scarce supplies, she put many of the other royal ladies to work making clothing for those who had lost their homes in the Blitz. It was then in 1940 that the governor general's office in the East Block of Parliament Hill was closed and moved to Rideau Hall. In December 1941, Winston Churchill arrived at the hall, where he presided over British Cabinet meetings via telephone from his bed.

=== Postwar and closed gates ===
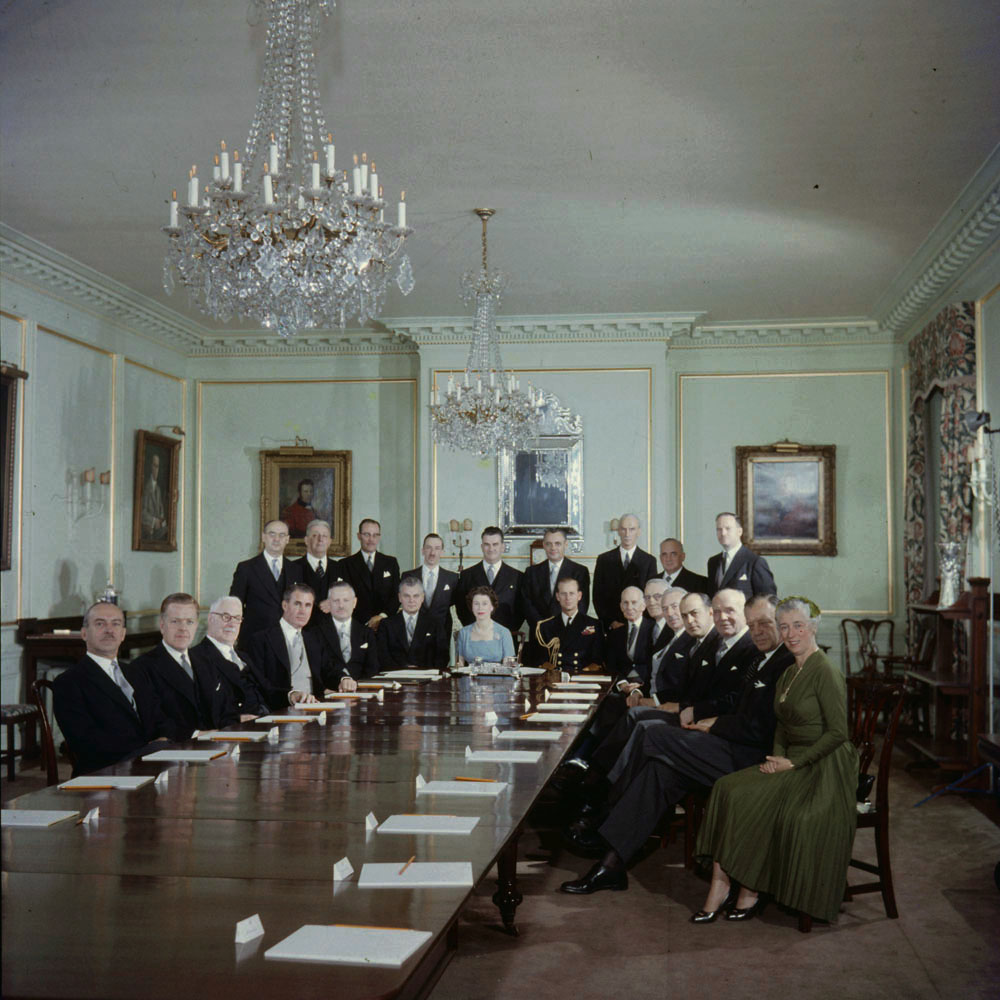
In the state dining room, Queen Elizabeth II (seated, centre) presides over a meeting of the Privy Council, including Prince Philiip (to her left) and Prime Minister John Diefenbaker (at her right)

At the end of the global war, the first peacetime ball at Rideau Hall was held for President of the United States Dwight D. Eisenhower, after which life within the household returned to normal. The transition from war to peace was marked by the appointment as governor general of the Viscount Alexander, whose son, Brian, reportedly used the portraits of former governors general throughout the hall as targets for his water pistol. During Alexander's tenure, Government House's first post-war Canadian royal visitors were the heiress presumptive to the throne, Princess Elizabeth, Duchess of Edinburgh (later Queen Elizabeth II), and her husband, Philip, Duke of Edinburgh, who came in late 1951 and, amongst other activities, took part in a square dance in the ballroom (replete with checked shirts). Churchill, once again Prime Minister of the United Kingdom, returned to Rideau Hall in January of the next year, where, sprawled on a sofa with a cigar in one hand and a brandy in the other, he persuaded Alexander to join the British Cabinet.

With the death of the King only a month following Churchill's 1952 visit, the front of Rideau Hall was covered with black bunting as a sign of mourning. As one of his last acts as king of Canada, George VI appointed Vincent Massey as not only the first Canadian-born viceregal resident of his Canadian home, but also the first who was single, with Massey having been widowed two years prior to his installation; his daughter-in-law, Lilias, thus acted as Chatelaine of Rideau Hall. Massey spoke of Rideau Hall as "a piece of architecture that might be regarded as possessing a certain lovable eccentricity," in spite of "some of the most regrettable pieces of furniture I have ever seen."

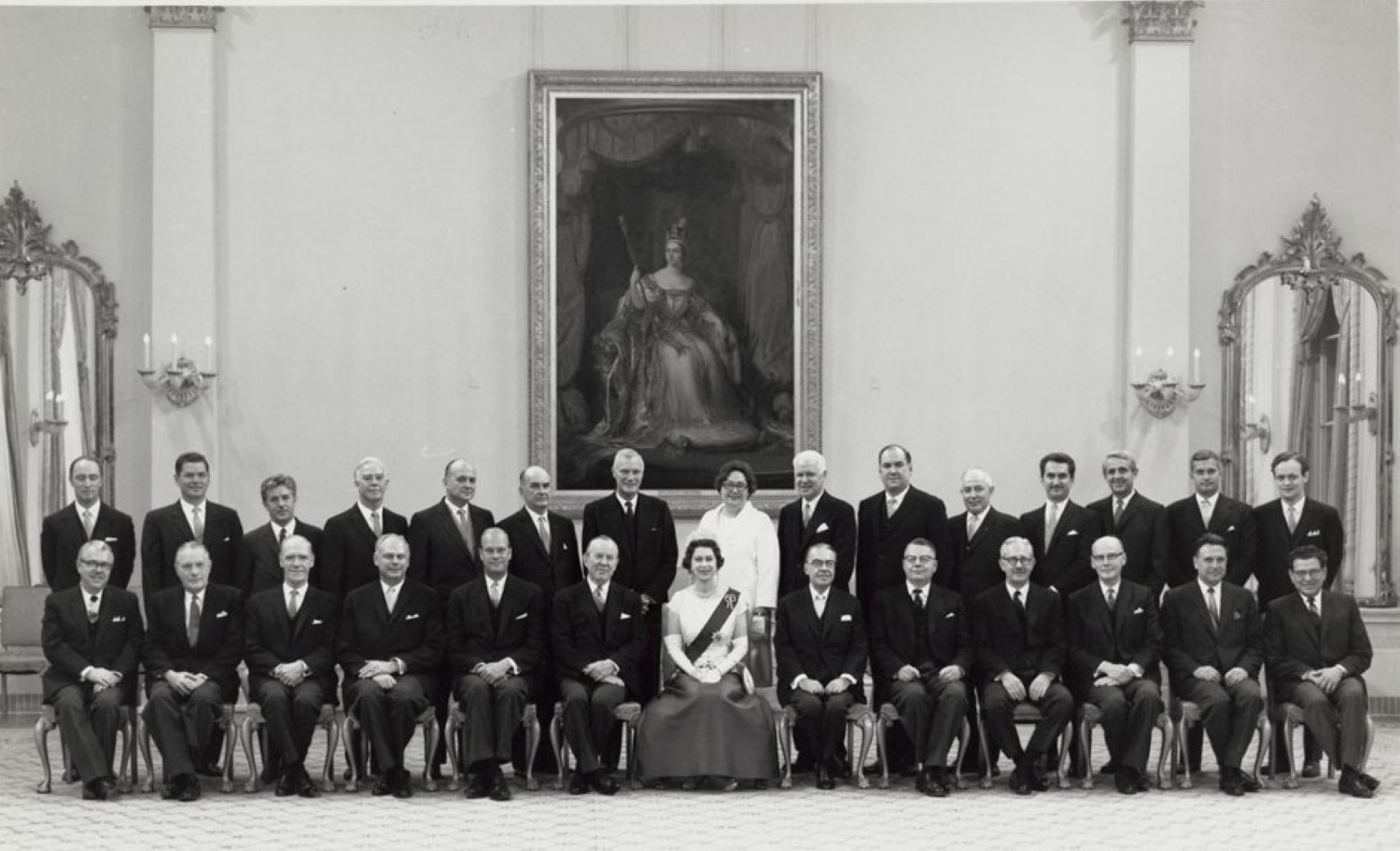
Elizabeth II with her Cabinet inside Rideau Hall, 1967

The number of formal occasions at Rideau Hall increased through the 1950s and 1960s, as Canada's diplomatic corps increased and the country gained greater international standing; visitors during Massey's tenure included Queen Juliana, President Eisenhower, Emperor Haile Selassie I of Ethiopia, Jawaharlal Nehru, and the presidents of Germany, Italy, and Indonesia. With the greater ease of travel, more members of Canada's royal family visited as well, including the Queen Mother; Mary, Princess Royal; Katharine, Duchess of Kent; Princess Margaret, Countess of Snowdon; Prince Philip, Duke of Edinburgh; and, in 1957, Elizabeth was again in residence, though for the first time as queen. It was during that stay that the Queen made her first-ever appearance on live television; from Rideau Hall, on 13 October (Thanksgiving Day), she delivered an address to Canadians, aired on the Canadian Broadcasting Corporation. The Queen also stayed in her Ottawa government house and held audience with an influx of 53 foreign heads of state and government during Expo 67, held in Montreal, and Canada's centennial celebrations.

During the October Crisis in 1970, Rideau Hall was heavily guarded for a number of weeks, due to the threat from the Front de libération du Québec, who had planted bombs and conducted kidnappings in Quebec during the crisis.

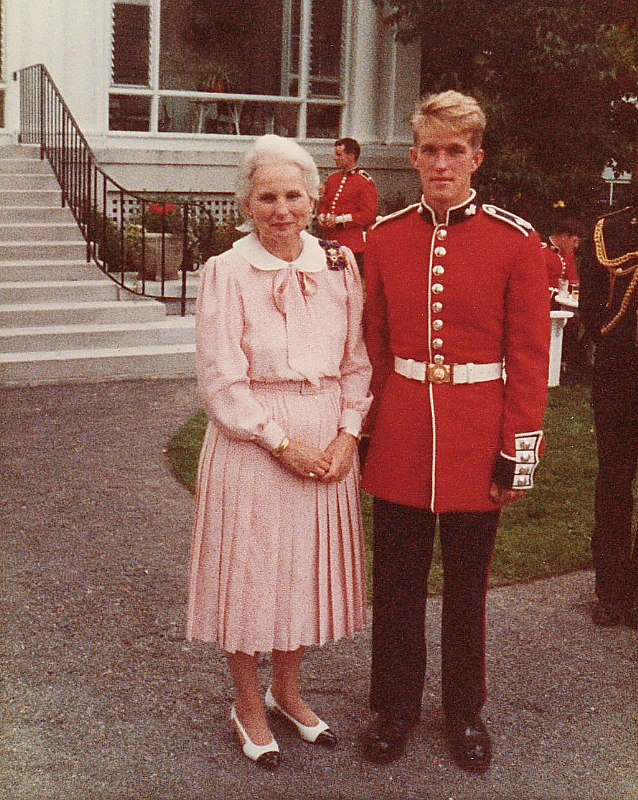
Governor General Jeanne Sauvé hosting a garden party outside Rideau Hall in 1985

The relatively free access to the grounds, which had been traditionally allowed since 1921 and enjoyed by tourists and local neighbours alike, ceased during Jeanne Sauvé's time as governor general from 1984 to 1990; access was granted only through invitation, appointment, or pre-arranged tours on certain days. The decision to do so was based on concerns expressed by the Royal Canadian Mounted Police and the National Capital Commission for the security of the vicereine and brought Rideau Hall in line with other official residences, including 24 Sussex Drive and Buckingham Palace, that did not allow public access. However, Sauvé was reported to have also been personally concerned for her safety, saying: "I'm worried about those crazy men out there."

This caused controversy not only because Sauvé had contradicted her earlier statement about Rideau Hall, wherein she said: "oh yes, definitely, it has to be open," but also because it denied Ottawa residents the use of the grounds. One group formed under the name Canada Unlock the Gate Group and asserted the closure was more due to Sauvé's selfish desire for privacy than any real security risks; The Globe and Mail reported in 1986 that the group planned to boycott the Governor General's annual garden party because of what they called her "bunker mentality". Sauvé's successor, Ray Hnatyshyn, reopened Government House and its gardens to the public. Sauvé also entertained a plan suggested by management consultants Price Waterhouse to move from Rideau Hall into Rideau Cottage, both for privacy and cost savings.

=== 21st century ===
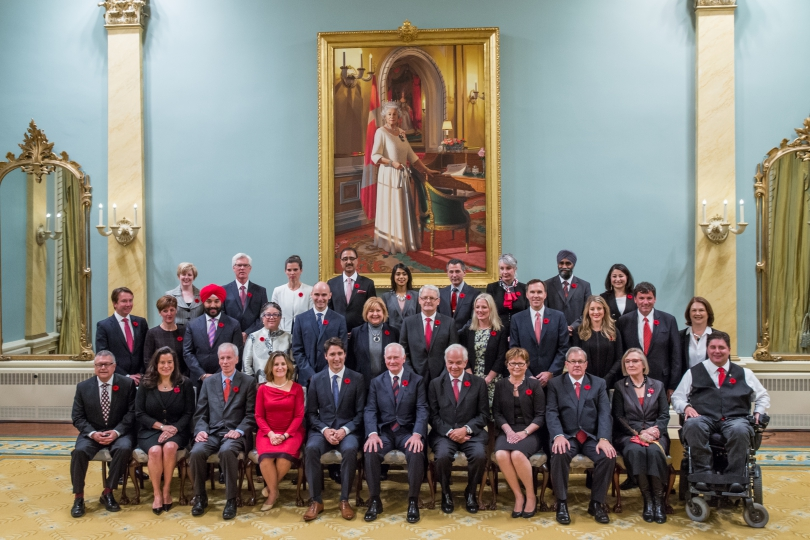
Governor General David Johnston with the newly sworn-in Cabinet in the ballroom of Rideau Hall, 4 November 2015

Julie Payette did not take up residence in Rideau Hall during her tenure since, at the time of her appointment in October 2017, renovations that are part of a long-term plan toward 2067 were underway. In particular, the private apartments of the palace were being altered to provide a "sense of privacy and intimacy". Payette instead moved into 7 Rideau Gate, the residence, immediately outside the main entrance to the Rideau Hall grounds, normally reserved for dignitaries on official visits to Canada. Though the alterations to the viceregal family suite were complete by March 2018, further renovations to improve accessibility began immediately after. There was an intent for Payette to move to Rideau Hall in the summer of 2019, but she spent the summer at the Citadelle of Quebec.

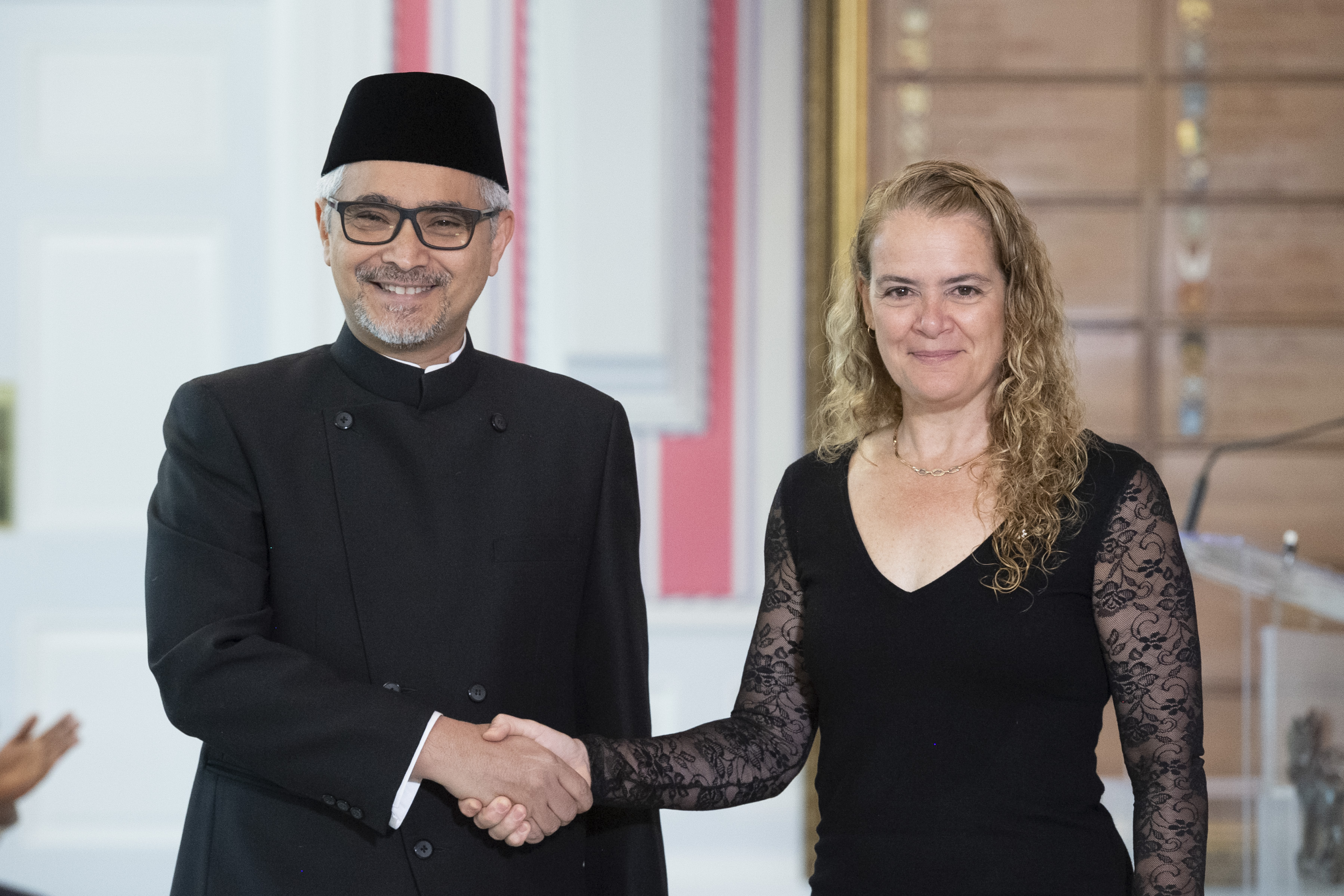
Governor General Julie Payette and Abdul Jailani, ambassador-designate of Indonesia during a presentation of credentials ceremony at Rideau Hall, 2019

The grounds were again closed through much of 2020 due to the COVID-19 pandemic. During that period, on 2 July, a former Canadian soldier and businessman from Bowsman, Manitoba, drove his truck through Thomas Gate, a pedestrian entrance in the fence surrounding the park. He continued in his vehicle approximately 120 metres along the path beyond before proceeding further on foot, hiding in the rose garden for a few minutes and then moving on towards the greenhouses behind Rideau Hall itself. Groundskeepers noticed the intruder and the Royal Canadian Mounted Police were eventually called. The man, who the police noted was armed, was arrested without incident. Neither the Governor General nor the Prime Minister, who is using Rideau Cottage as a temporary residence while 24 Sussex Drive is under renovation, were on the Rideau Hall property at the time. According to a preliminary investigation by the RCMP, the man intended to have the Prime Minister "arrested" for recent policy decisions.

== Function ==
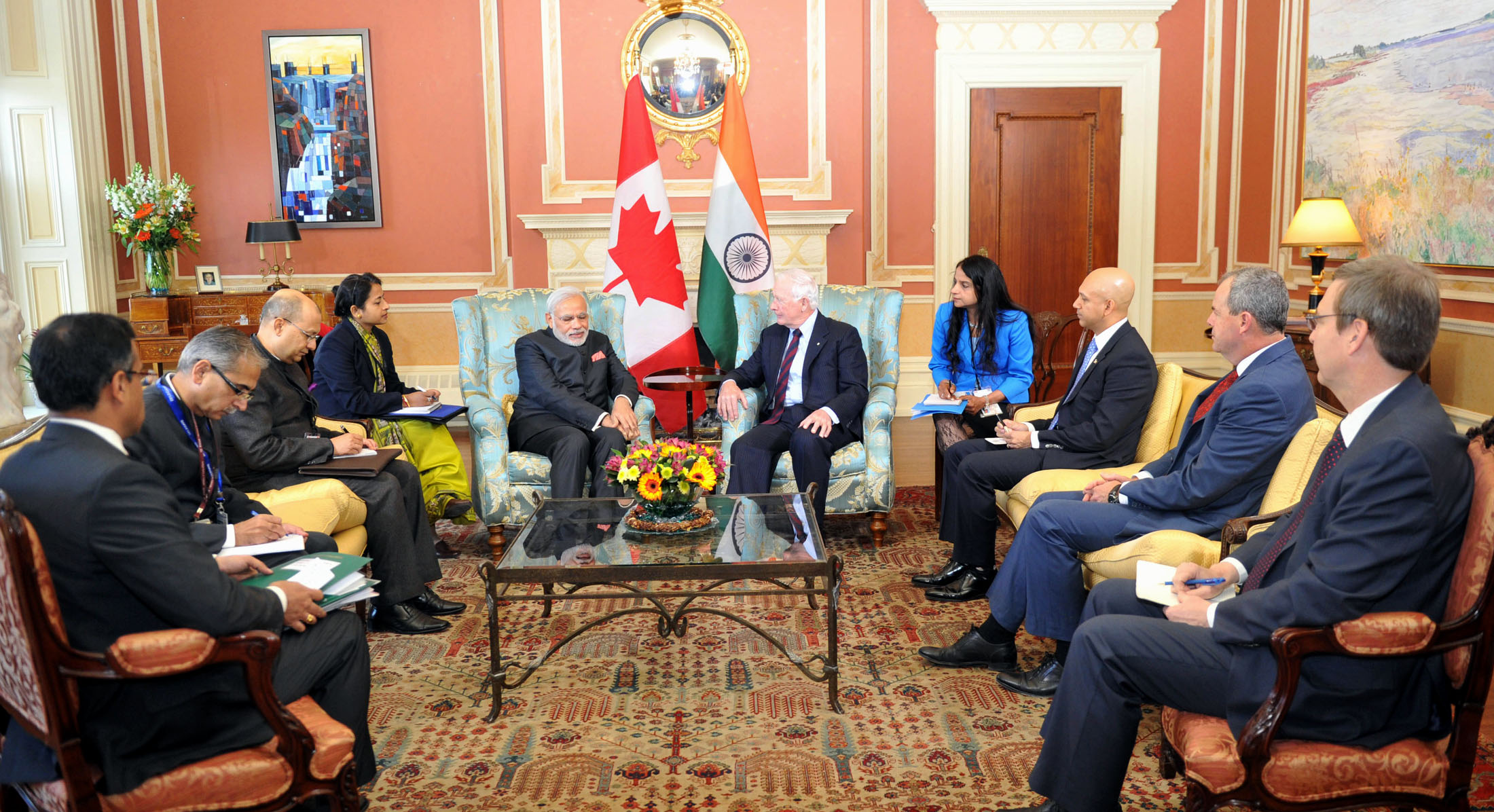
Governor General David Johnston holds an audience with Prime Minister of India Narendra Modi in Rideau Hall's large drawing room, 15 April 2015

Rideau Hall's main purpose is to house the governor general of Canada and his or her offices, including the Canadian Heraldic Authority. It is also the residence of Canada's monarch when he is in Ottawa. and has a royal and viceregal household to support the sovereign and governor general, comprising a maître d’hôtel, chefs, footmen, valets, dressers, pages, aides-de-camp (drawn from the junior officers of the Canadian Armed Forces), equerries, and others.

The majority of Rideau Hall's area is dedicated to affairs of state; only 500 m^{2} (5,400 sq ft) of the total 9,500 m^{2} (102,000 sq ft) given to private living quarters. Some 200 events are held at Rideau Hall every year, most being Canadian award presentations and investitures. In this way, the palace is where prime ministers and other members of the federal Cabinet are sworn-in and federal writs of election are dropped, among other constitutional functions of the governor general. Heads of state and government, both incoming and outgoing ambassadors and high commissioners to Canada, and Canadian Crown ministers and loyal opposition leaders are received at Rideau Hall for audiences with either the viceroy or the sovereign, should the latter be in residence.

Although there is a state dining room in Rideau Hall, state dinners and luncheons are usually held in the larger ballroom or tent room. In setting up for a formal meal, a measuring stick is used to set the tableware and locate the chairs relative to the tables uniformly. The ingredients and wines are "100 per cent Canadian [...] reflecting Canada's many cultures."

The residence is also open to the public, running a visitors' program and free tours of the state rooms throughout the year, as well as educational tours for students; it is the only one of the six official residences in the National Capital Region that is publicly accessible. A visitors' centre is on the grounds, adjacent to the main gate. Rideau Hall takes part annually in Doors Open Ottawa and children may trick-or-treat at the house each Hallowe'en.

== Architecture ==
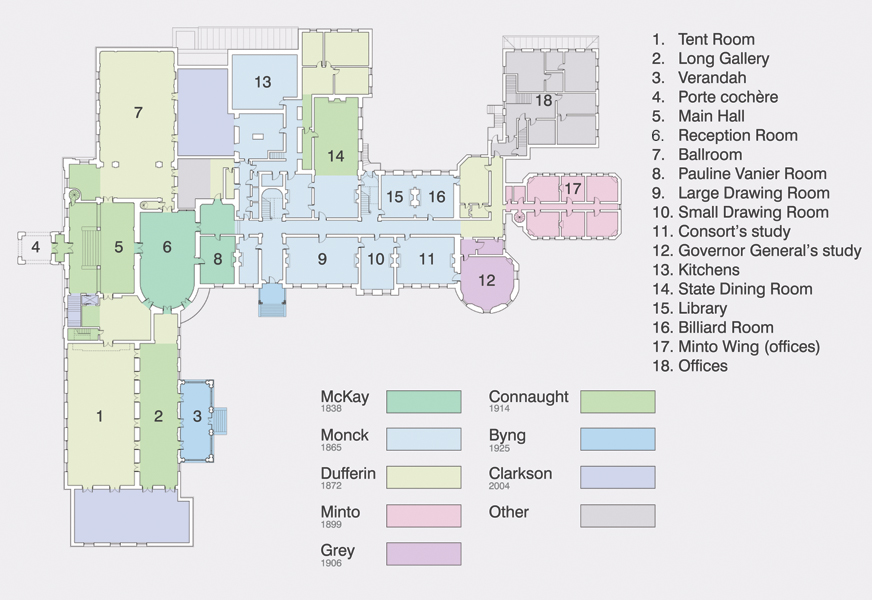
Floor plan of the main level of Rideau Hall, showing the various accretions onto the original McKay villa

The original 1838 structure was relatively small; only two storeys tall with a full-height, central, curved bay, and an accordingly curved pediment on top, the villa was designed by Thomas McKay (who had also designed and built Earnscliffe) in a Regency style, inspired by the work of architect Sir John Soane, who had himself designed a never-realised government house for the then capital of Upper Canada, York, in 1818. Unlike the present arrangement, the rooms of the McKay villa for entertaining, sleeping, and service were dispersed throughout the two floors of the structure, with the main parlour on the second level, in an oval room behind the curved, south bay, which National Capital Commission Chief Architect David Scarlett said in 2014 was made in such a shape so as to display the advanced abilities of McKay's stonemasons. The main entrance to the house was on the west side and opened into a hall with stairs to the upper floor directly ahead. Along the south front were a library, a dining room, and a boudoir, all with French doors opening onto a narrow balcony; the dining room was served by three of these doors, one of which now opens into the tent room's antechamber, one into the long gallery, and one that still opens to the outside. The French door originally opening from the boudoir is today the window of the Pauline Vanier room.

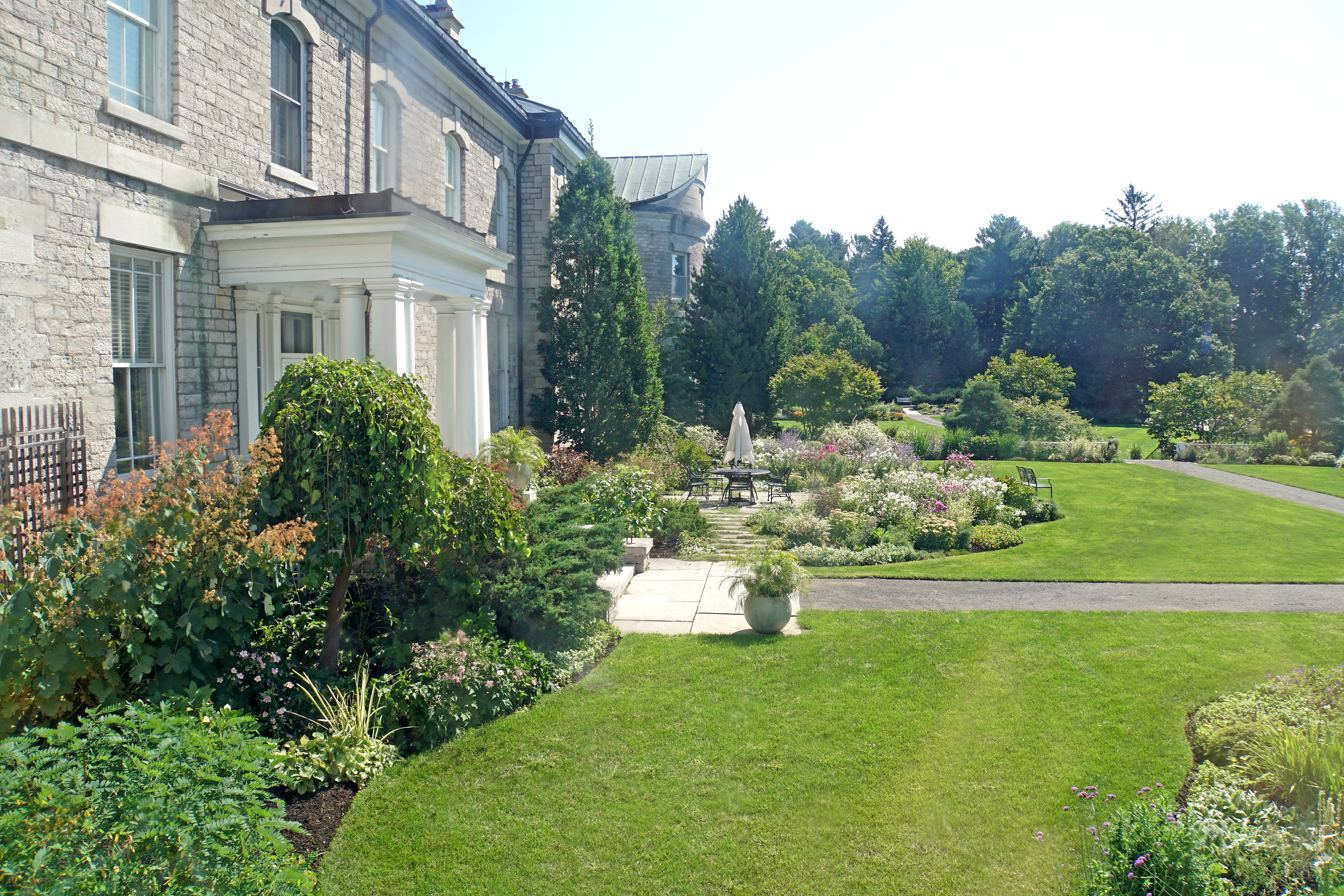
The Monck wing in 2018; the verandah was removed between 1911 and 1939

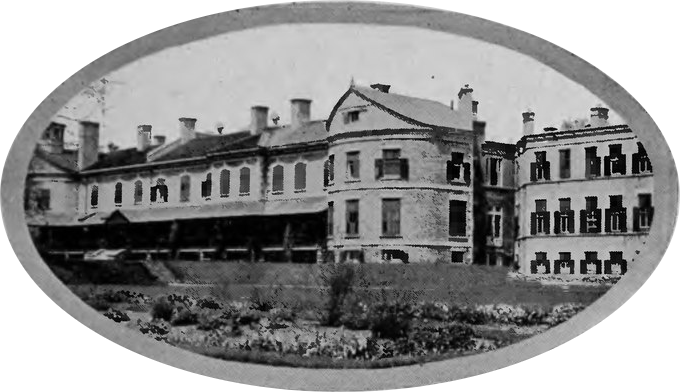
A 1911 image showing the Monck wing (left), the Grey addition (centre right), with the bowed front for the governor general's study, and the Minto wing (far right)

Initially rented from the McKay family as a temporary accommodation for the Canadian viceroy, the house has since been expanded numerous times. The Viscount Monck oversaw the first addition to the villa in 1865: a long wing extending to the east and built in a style that, while attempting to be harmonious with the original, was intended to resemble the governor general's residence in Quebec, Spencer Wood, which Monck greatly preferred over Rideau Hall. The extension was thus done in an overall Norman style of design that was typical in Quebec at the time, and had a similar long, covered verandah, a cross hall, and a new staircase capped by an ornate stained glass lantern. The exterior walls were clad in ashlar limestone masonry and the roof in cedar shingles until replaced by copper in 1913.

In 1872, during the tenure of the Earl of Dufferin, the indoor Tennis Court and the ballroom were added to the western end of the house, arranged to the south and north, respectively, of the main entrance. The ballroom is a structure of heavy timber framing with brick infill and finished stone exterior. Then, when the Earl of Minto arrived in 1898 with his large family and household, the Minto wing was constructed on the east end of Rideau Hall and was completed in the following year, though this was again intended to only be a temporary measure until a proper government house could be built. Minto's successor, the Earl Grey, added the governor general's study to the far east end of the Monck wing, thus symmetrically balancing out the curved bay and pediment of the original McKay villa to the west.

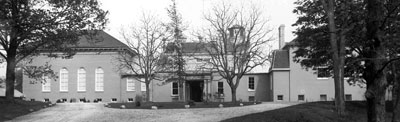
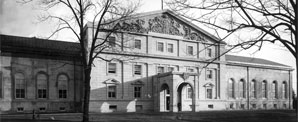
Images of the west façade of Rideau Hall before (above) and after (below) the addition of the Mappin block in 1914.

One of the greatest alterations to the form of Rideau Hall came in 1913, with the construction of the Mappin block as a link between the ballroom and what was then the tennis court (today the tent room), as well as to disguise the misalignment between those two structures. As such, Chief Dominion Architect David Ewart designed the Mappin block in an "adapted Florentine architectural style", using limestone ashlar, and extended that over the flanking wings by re-facing them and harmonizing their window and cornice heights.

The Mappin block itself is three storeys in height, and its front is divided by pilasters into five bays, with the central one slightly wider than the equal other four. The windows on the main floor are each surrounded by smaller pilasters beneath a triangular pediment formed by keel moulding geisons, while the second level windows are each simply framed by astragal moulding broken at the top by a keystone. A heavy entablature separates the second and third levels, atop which sits less pronounced pilasters and simply framed windows, with the entire façade capped by a narrow cornice and a pediment with a tympanum that bears a bas relief of the Royal Arms of the United Kingdom (believed to be the largest rendition in the Commonwealth).

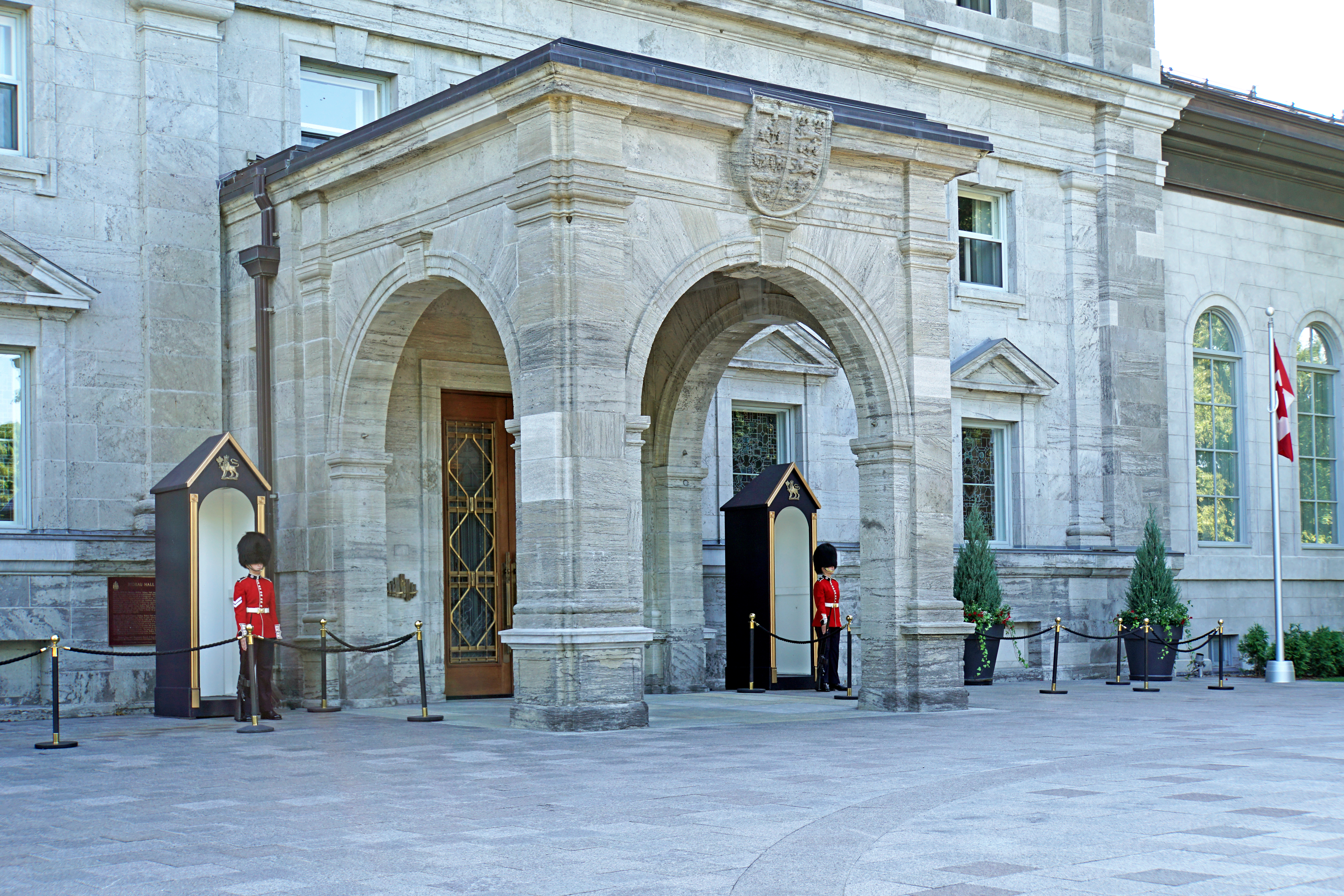
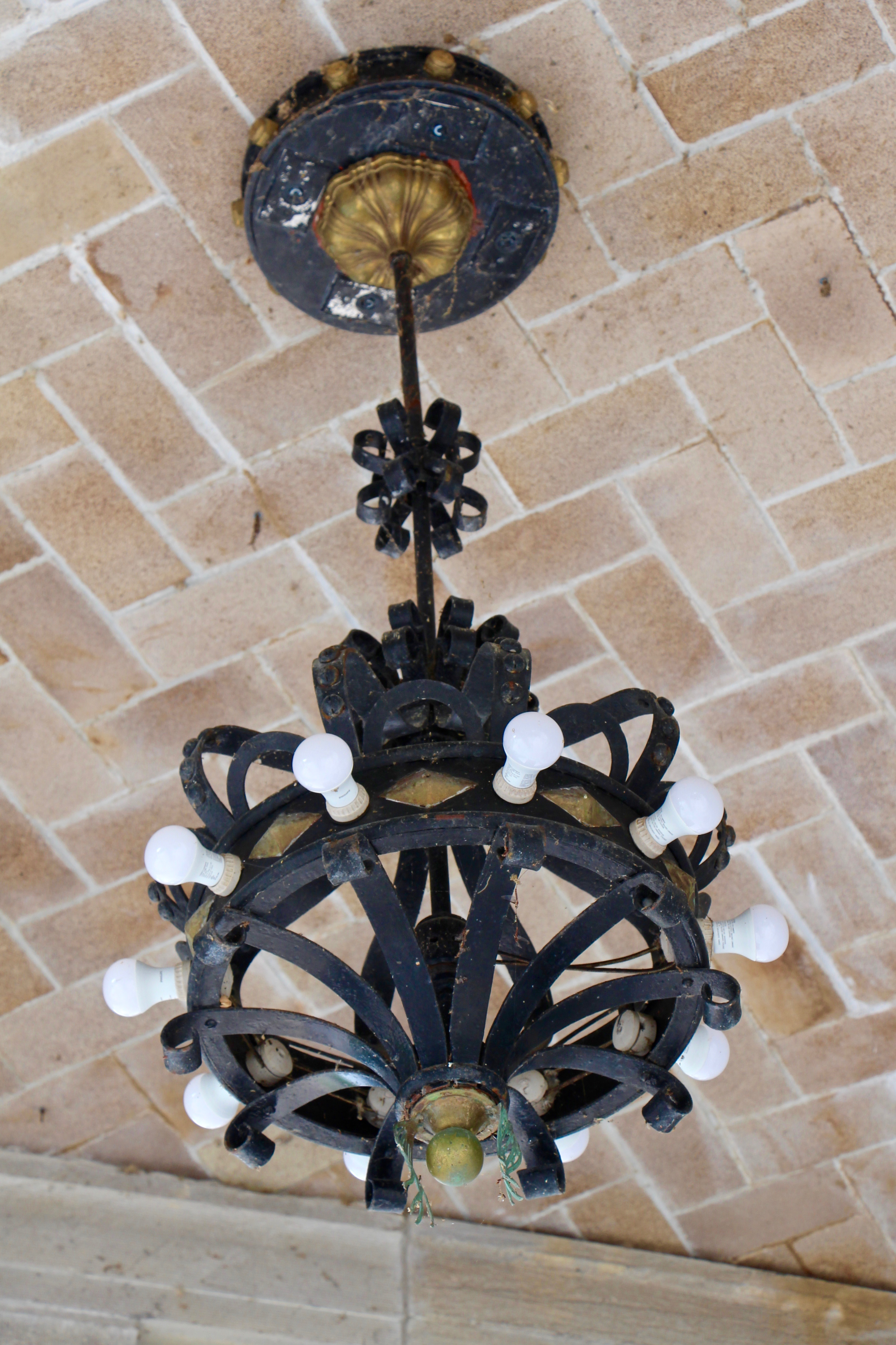
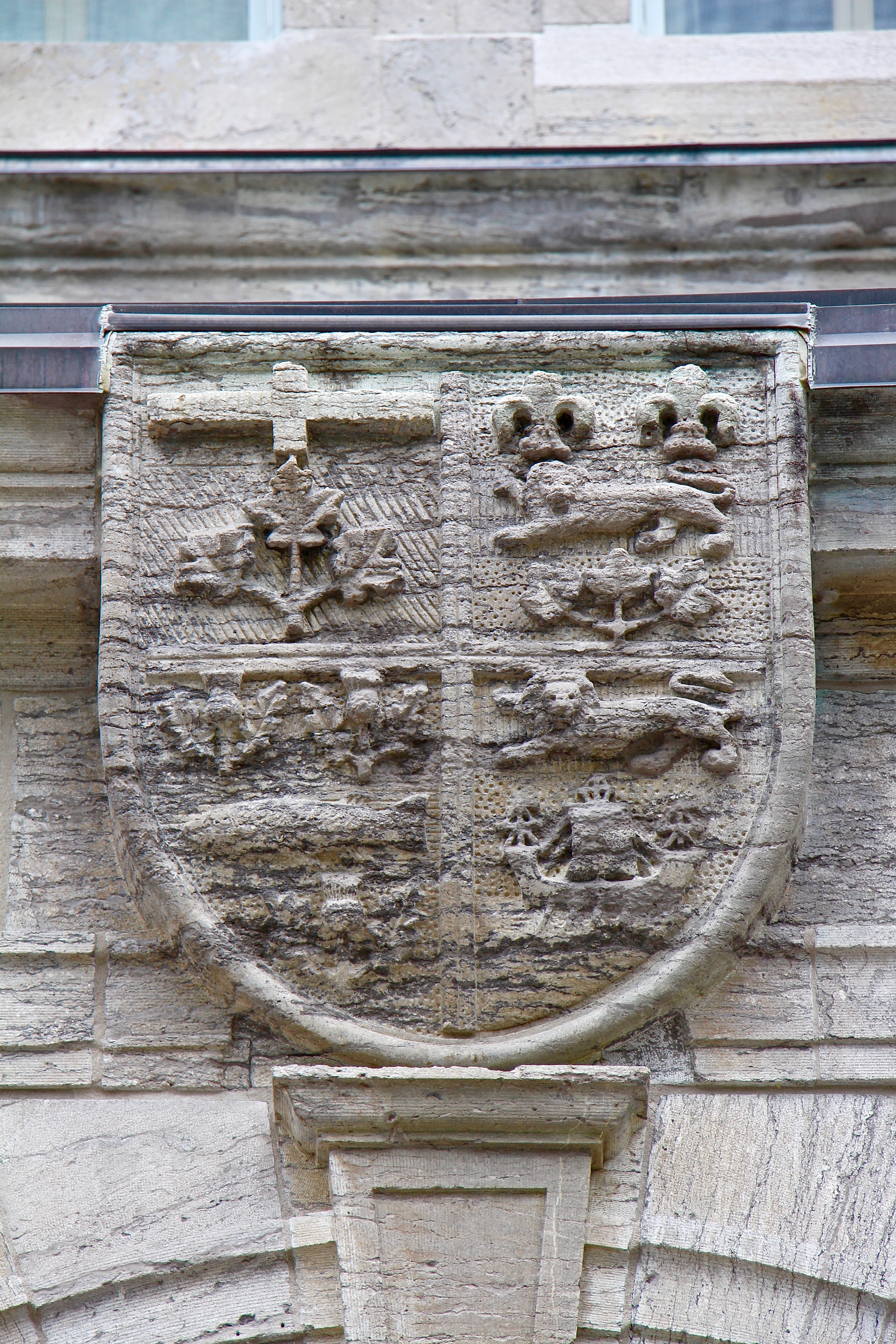
(Clockwise from top) the porte-cochère of the Queen's Entrance, seen behind; the escutcheon of the Arms of Canada in 1868 as carved into a stone atop the porte-cochère; the chandelier light fixture and herringbone brickwork in the porte-cochère's vault

Rideau Hall's main entrance is part of the Mappin block. To honour Queen Elizabeth II, the doorway was, on 1 July 2017 (the sesquicentennial of Confederation, in the 65th year of Elizabeth's reign), named the Queen's Entrance by Governor General David Johnston in a ceremony attended by Prince Charles and his wife, Camilla, Duchess of Cornwall. The bronze grilles on the doors are formed into a geometric pattern meant to represent infrastructure associated with settlement, including the Canadian Pacific Railway, while circular etching on the glass panels evokes indigenous cultures and the vertical lines echo paintings by Tom Thomson. The exterior handles are each fashioned from paired bronze dowels with elements, attached at top and bottom, formed from the same metal to appear as twigs. Inside, the push-plates, also of bronze, each have one of the supporters from the Royal Coat of Arms of Canada carved into them. Affixed to the exterior wall next to the entrance is a plaque made of forged and carved bronze shaped to appear as seven short, vertical planks of driftwood joined by a horizontal scroll in polished brass, bearing the words The Queen's Entrance / Entrée de la reine, under the crowned royal cypher of Elizabeth II. These pieces, along with the grilles, were made by artist and blacksmith Cairn Cunnane.

For formal arrivals at the main door, this addition also included a porte-cochère with three arched openings between columns resting on the foundations of posts that supported the McKay villa's porte-cochère. The centre opening is topped with a carved stone rendition of the shield of the Royal Arms of Canada as it appeared between 1868 and 1870. All the arches can be fitted during the winter with fanlights and glass doors to provide an enclosed space in which to exit cars.

On the third floor of the Mappin block is the apartment for aides-de-camp. It is from the kitchen within that apartment that the flagpole can be reached via a ladder and an attic space.

Further projects that were completed by 1914 were the enargement in 1912 of the state dining room and addition of the long gallery to the east of the tent room. Off the long gallery is the verandah, added in 1927. It is a simple, stucco-clad structure containing one room with large windows and French doors overlooking the upper terrace lawn in the corner between the Dufferin and Monck wings. Between the windows are half-round and flat classical pilasters. A set of stairs leads from the French doors to the upper terrace.

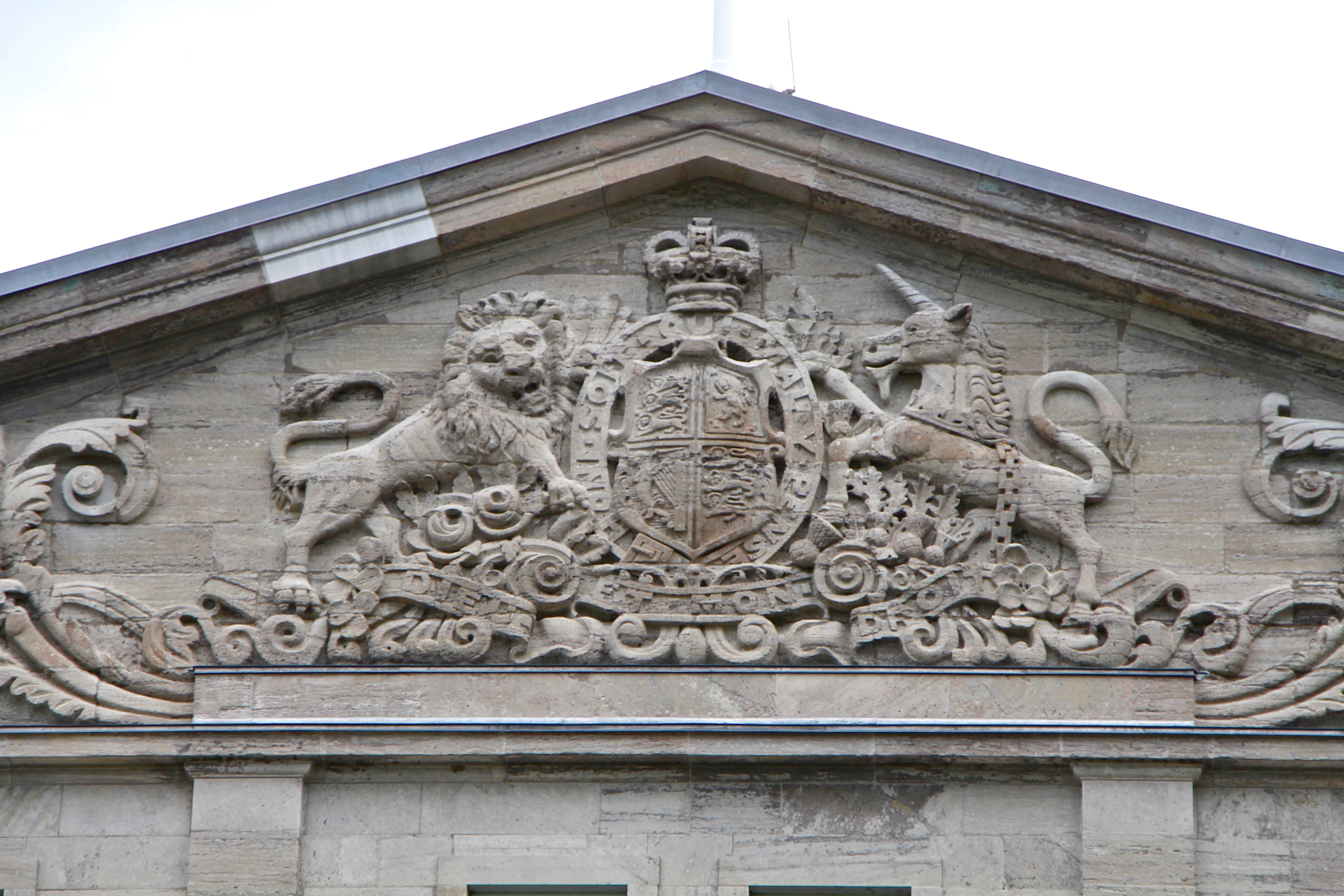
The royal coat of arms of the United Kingdom carved into the tympanum of the pediment atop the Mappin block in 1914, seven years before the creation of the Royal Coat of Arms of Canada. Evidence of the 2006–2007 restoration can be seen in the mismatched colouration of the stones in the hood mould.

An accessible entrance—opened by Anne, Princess Royal, and named after her—was added in 1982 and the Minto wing was eventually converted from residences to offices. Then, at the prompting of Governor General Michaëlle Jean, the main façade of Rideau Hall underwent a major renovation through 2006 and 2007, overseen by the National Capital Commission, which has been responsible for the maintenance and upkeep of the building and its grounds since 1986. Masonry was treated and restored, the original sash windows rehabilitated and stripped of their lead paint, and the copper roof of the Mappin wing was repaired. This was the first time any considerable work had been done on the front façade since the 1960s. A project began in 2012 to replace the building's climate control system—consisting of three large external chillers and multiple window-mounted air conditioners—with a geothermal heating and cooling system, expected to supply approximately half of the building's heating requirements during winter, until the geothermal system is expanded in future.

The hall was designated as a classified heritage property by the Federal Heritage Buildings Review Office in 1986, giving it the highest heritage significance in Canada.

== Decor and furnishings ==
Rideau Hall has long been a collection point for Canadian art and cabinetry. As early as the first viceregal inhabitants, the hall has held pieces by prominent Canadian cabinet makers, such as Jacques & Hay of Toronto, James Thomson of Montreal, and William Drum of Quebec. Originally, the interior decoration was heavily Victorian, with many Rococo influences. Renovations, however, have turned the interiors into predominantly Georgian spaces, with Adam and Palladian elements. Until the 1960s, the contents and colours of the house changed with each successive royal and viceregal family; the consort typically seeing it as her duty to update Rideau Hall to suit both her personal and contemporary tastes.

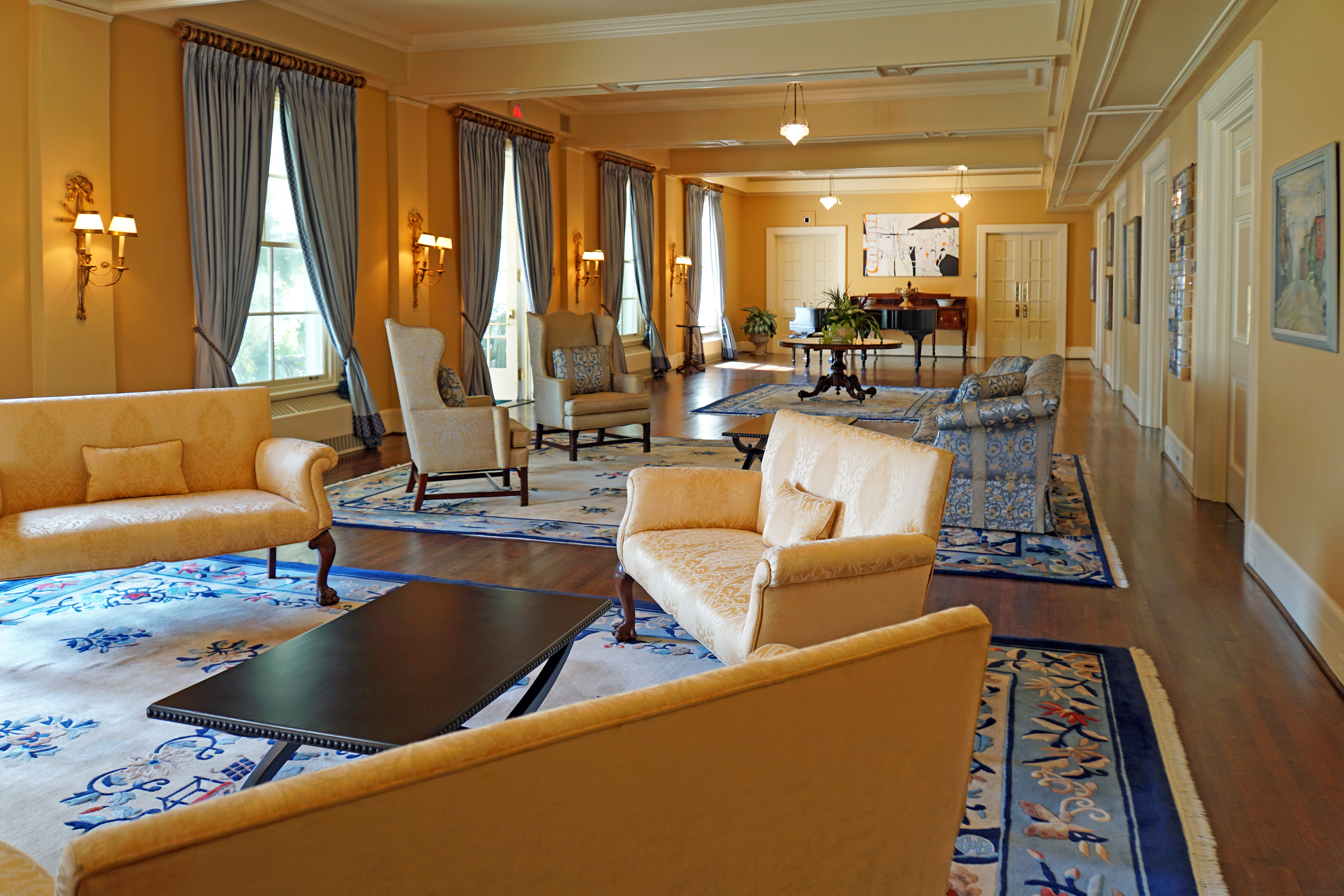
The long gallery features Chinoiserie decorations collected by the Marchioness of Willingdon

Today the rooms are furnished both with elements from the history of the residence as well as art and other objects that showcase contemporary Canadian culture. The long gallery's Chinoiserie decoration was restored in 1993 at the direction of Gerda Hnatyshyn, wife of Governor General Ray Hnatyshyn, putting back much of the furniture and artifacts that had been collected by the Machioness of Willingdon throughout her tour of China in 1926. The space, used to greet and host functions for ambassadors and high commissioners to Canada, now contains five carpets donated by the Hongkong and Shanghai Bank and a Steinway & Sons baby grand piano that belonged to Glenn Gould. Other consorts left their mark on Rideau Hall, such as Princess Louise's painted apple branches on a 6-panel Georgian door (into the room adjacent to the Pauline Vanier room) in the first-floor corridor and Nora Michener's donated collection of Inuit sculpture. Governor General Adrienne Clarkson and her husband, John Ralston Saul, not only oversaw the extensive repainting of the state rooms from a consistent white to more historically accurate and polychrome palette, but also worked with Ontario potter Bill Reddick to develop Rideau Hall's first Canadian porcelain state dinner service.

Since Vincent Massey's time as governor general, the viceroy has worked closely with the Department of Public Works and Government Services in repairing and refurbishing Rideau Hall; the department now provides a more systematic approach to the maintenance of the palace, with a full-time building manager in charge of the project. The National Capital Commission is charged with the decoration of the rooms; since 2004 the commission has undertaken a project to restore many of the salons and other state rooms to the period in which they were first built.

=== McKay villa and Mappin block ===
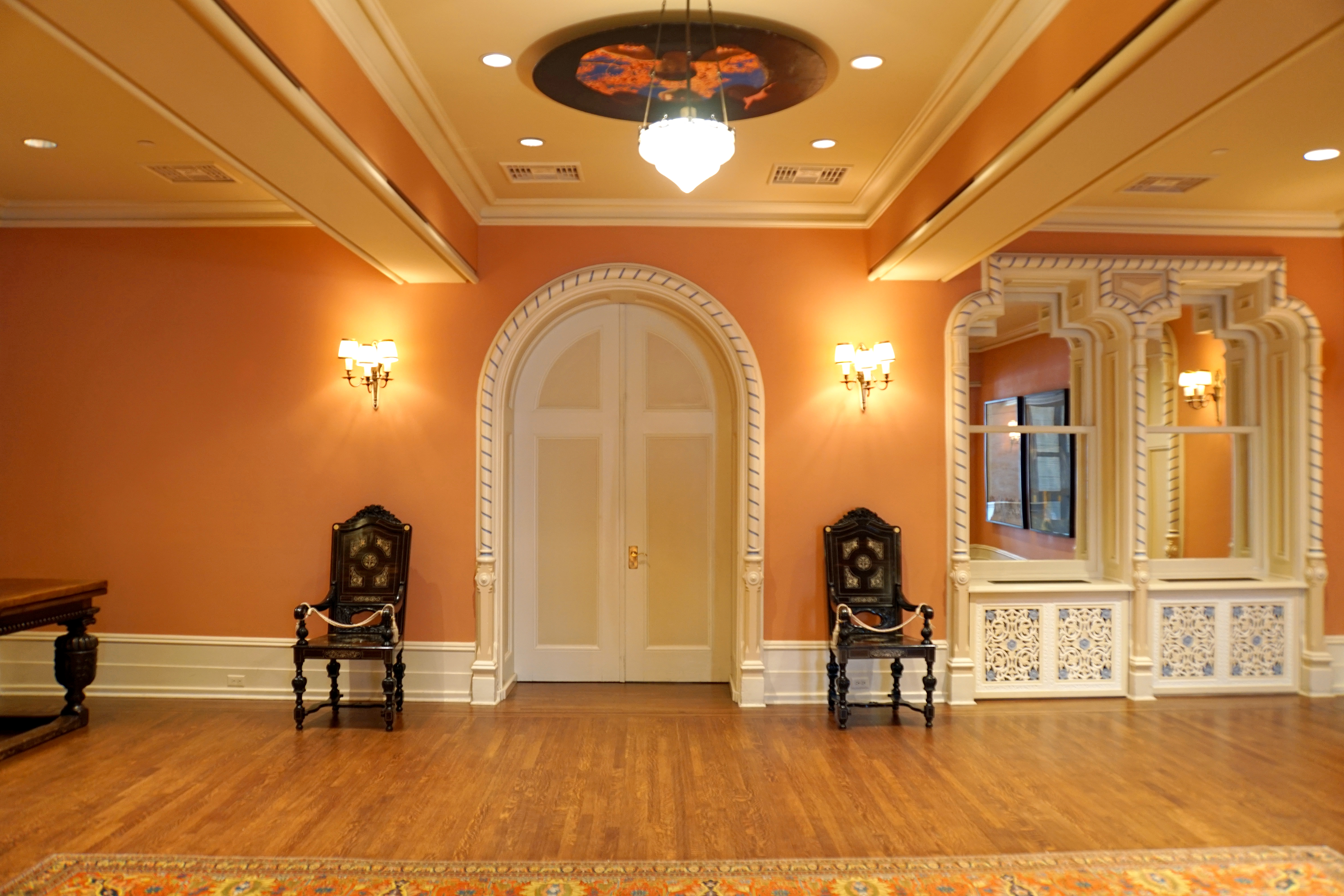
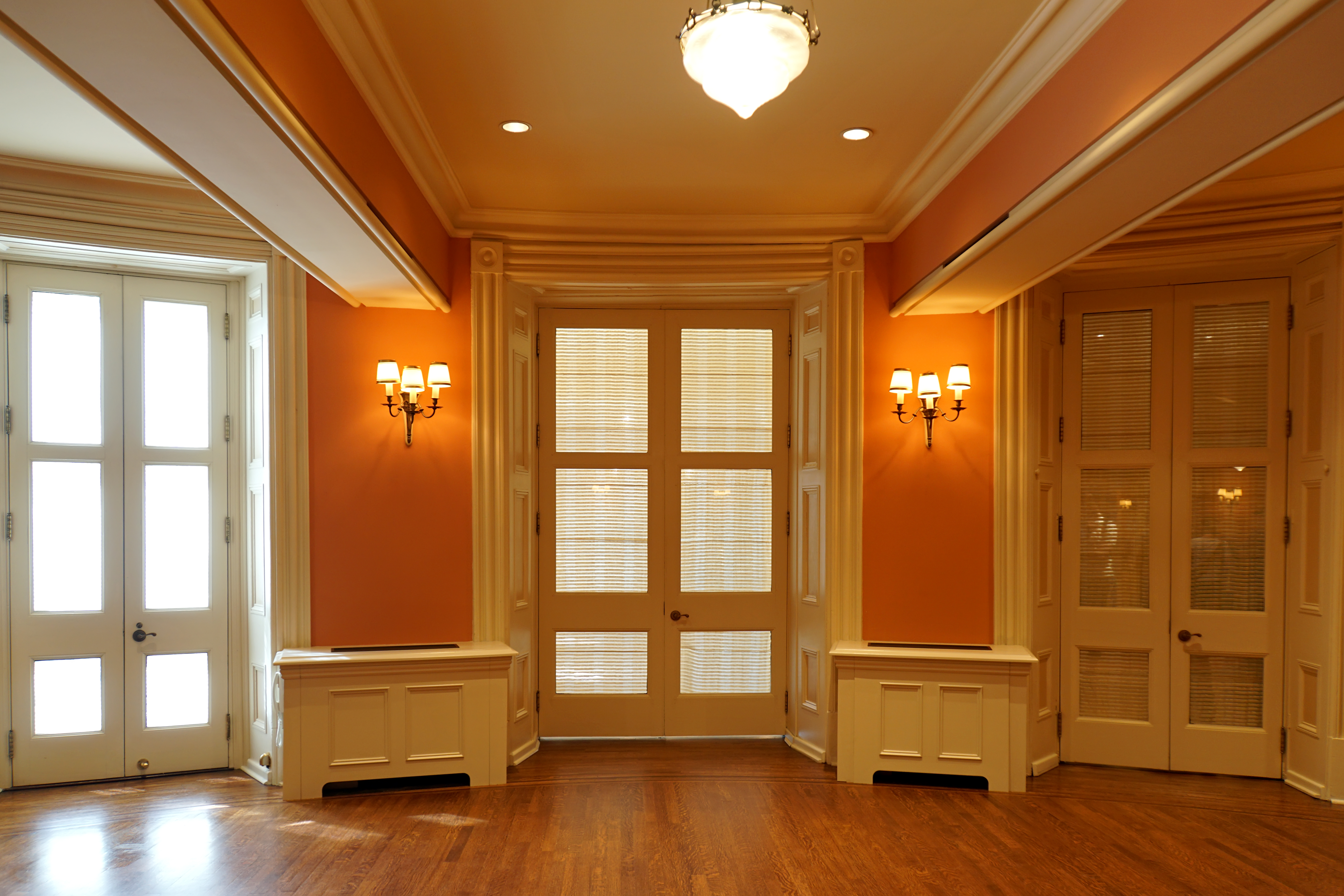
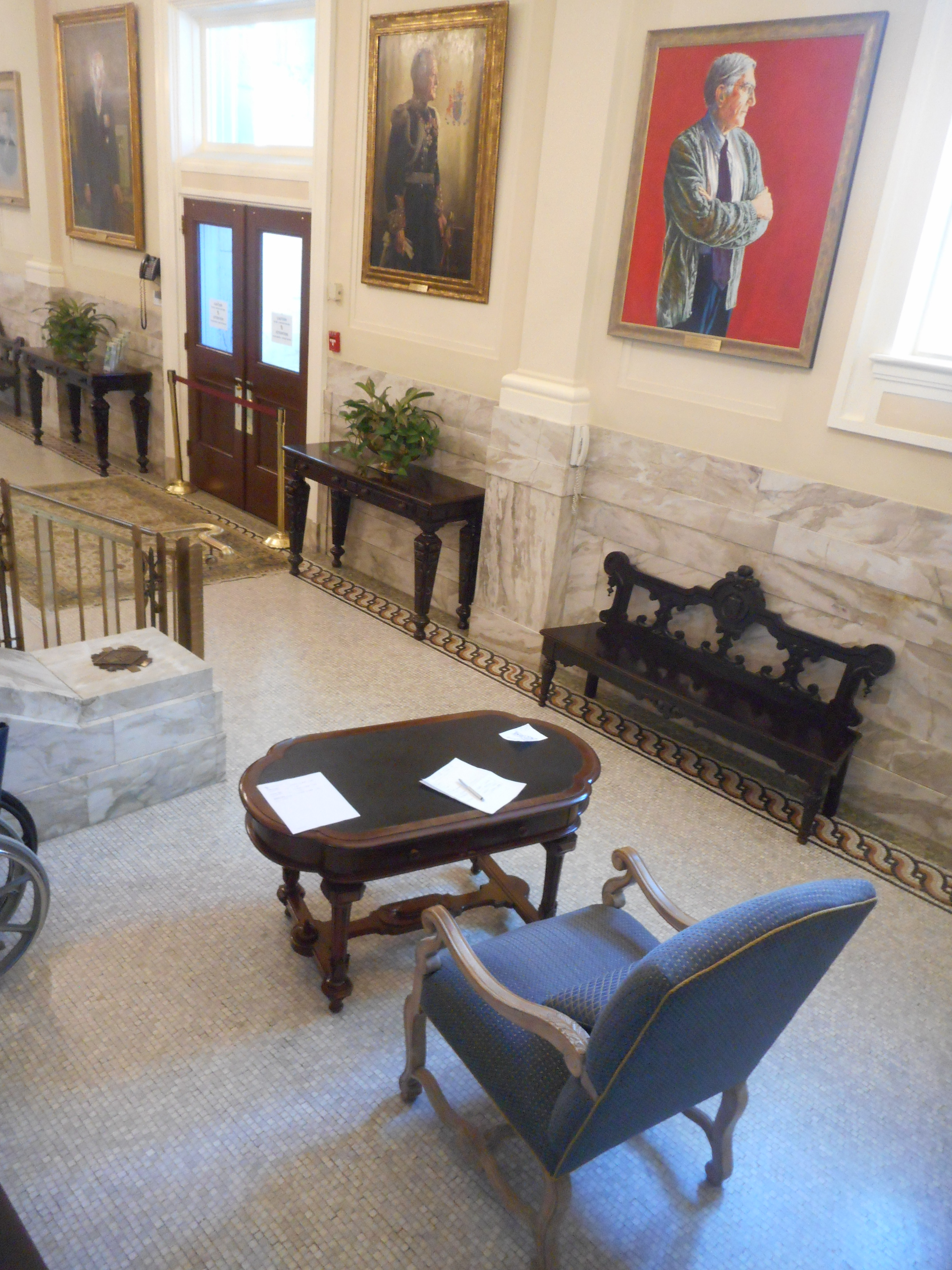
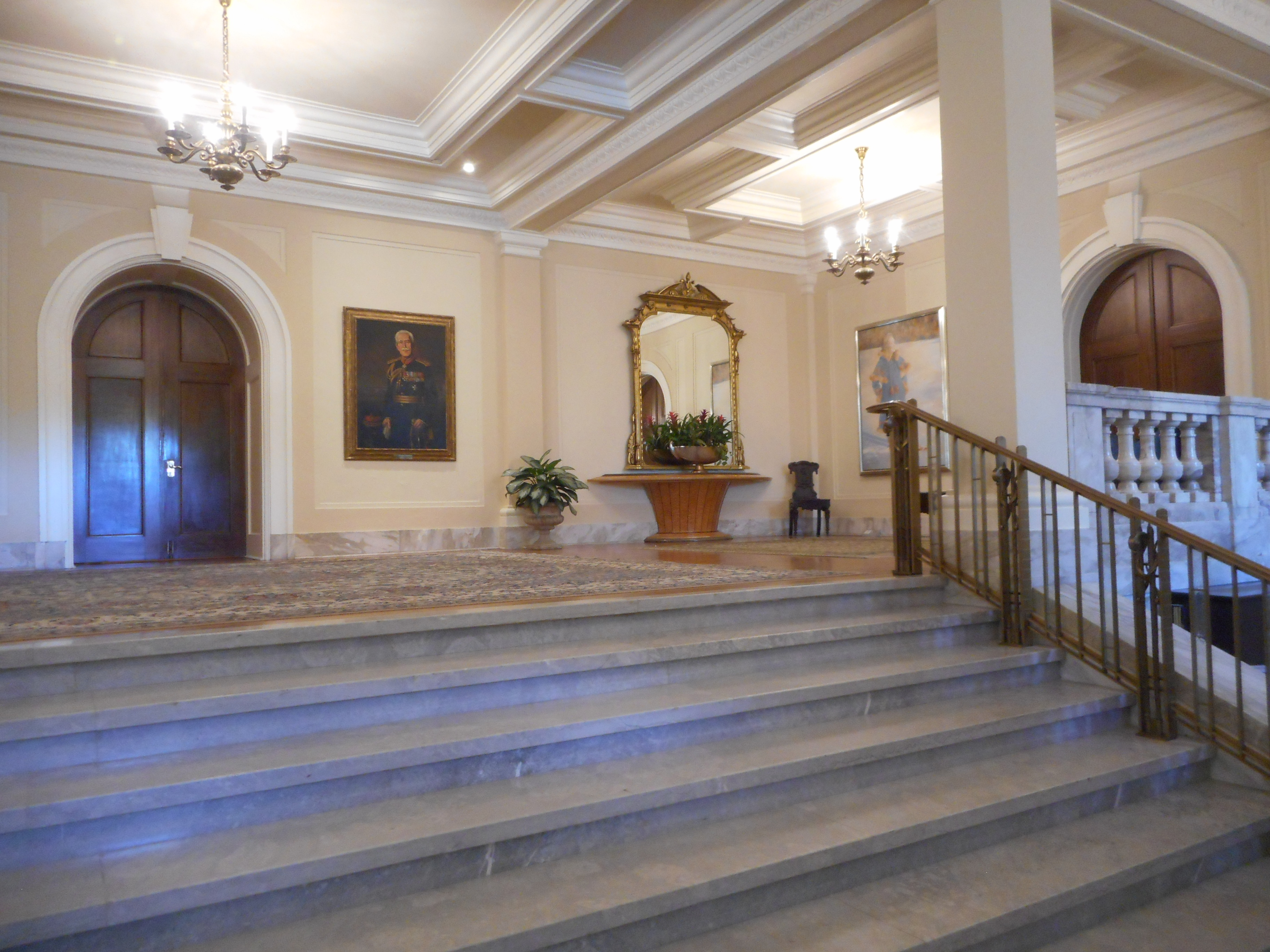
(Clockwise from top) the reception room of Rideau Hall, showing original windows of the McKay villa (right), now blind; the three original McKay villa French doors in the reception room; the Edwardian-style entrance hall inside the Mappin wing; the door across from the top of the stair enters into the reception room

The sole remaining part of the original McKay villa is the reception room on the ground floor and the royal suite directly above. The former was created in 1913 by removing the interior partitions of the villa; the baseboards, mouldings, and trims date from that era. It is where small ceremonies and presentations take place, while the latter is an oval room that was previously the drawing room of the original McKay villa and was subsequently used as a ballroom, a studio, and a study before becoming the monarch's bedroom. Some signs of the McKay house are still visible, notably in the now blanked window on the north wall of the reception room and the ornate plaster ceiling in the royal suite.

Directly west of these rooms is the Edwardian Mappin wing, which contains the entrance hall. Its walls are partly panelled, partly clad in marble; the lower floor covered in mosaic tile and the upper with wood. The two levels are connected by a wide, white marble, central stair; to each side, at the upper landing, are marble guards with ornate, Neoclassical balustrades. Across from the top of the stair is a door to the reception room.

In 2012, bronze and art glass handrails, funded by a private donation from Rouge Herald Extraordinary Roger Lindsay and commissioned by the National Capital Commission, were added to each side of the stair to both improve accessibility and commemorate the Diamond Jubilee of Queen Elizabeth II. As such, bronze plaques bearing the Queen's royal cypher, the dates 1952 and 2012, and the words vivat regina (Latin for 'Long live the queen') were affixed to the bases of the marble stringers on either side of the staircase. The proportions and configuration of the handrails were inspired by the Edwardian architecture of the entrance hall and the decorations were intended to "evoke the nation's history, without resorting to conventional iconography." To express the work of the human hand as well as that of machines, the handrail comprises both forged or hand-tooled, fluidly shaped components—the branch-shaped bars, volute brackets, the icy, flowing patterns etched on the narrow art glass panels—with rectilinear, stock, machined-bronze pieces. This meeting of nature and human creation "stands for the tie between Canada's evolution as a country and the landscape that nurtured it." The shield of Roger Lindsay's coat of arms is affixed discreetly to the lower newel post, on the north side of the stair.

The Royal Window in the entrance hall

The Viceregal Window in the entrance hall

On the opposite wall, to the left of the entrance, is the Royal Window—a stained glass piece commemorating the 40th anniversary of the accession of Elizabeth II to the throne, displaying, between the Queen's Canadian royal standard above and the Great Seal of Canada below, the monarch's coat of arms for Canada surrounded by the shields of each of the provincial coats of arms. Additionally, in the top two corners are images of Elizabeth's royal cypher, balancing out representations of the Sovereign's badges for both the Order of Canada and the Order of Military Merit in the bottom two corners. Another stained glass window is found to the right of the entrance, marking the first appointment of a Canadian-born governor general; the viceregal position is symbolized by a crowned lion holding a maple leaf and surrounded by the shields of the arms of the first seven persons to hold the post.

=== The Dufferin wings ===
Book-ending the Mappin wing are the tent room—used for slightly less formal gatherings—and the ballroom—the centre of state life at Rideau Hall. It is in the latter space that honours and awards ceremonies take place and members of the Cabinet are sworn in; as such, it is the second most photographed and televised room in Canada, preceded only by the House of Commons. The ballroom is also where ambassadors present their diplomatic credentials and large-scale state dinners are held; some 60,000 meals are served in the ballroom every year to up to 130 guests per function. The room can accommodate 350 people for functions not requiring tables. Both the tent room and ballroom were added during the tenure of the Earl of Dufferin.

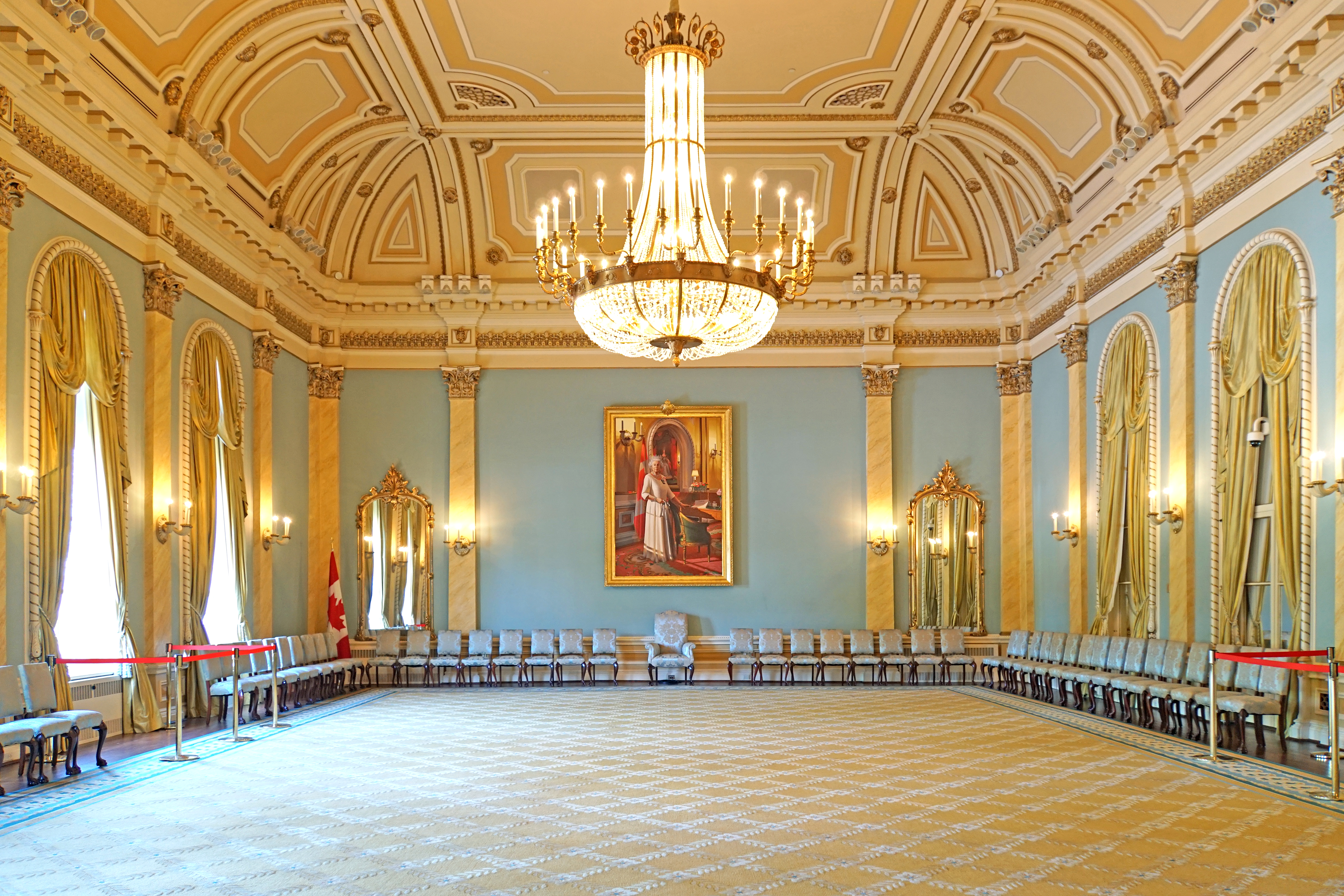
The ballroom, with the Sovereign's Wall the far end

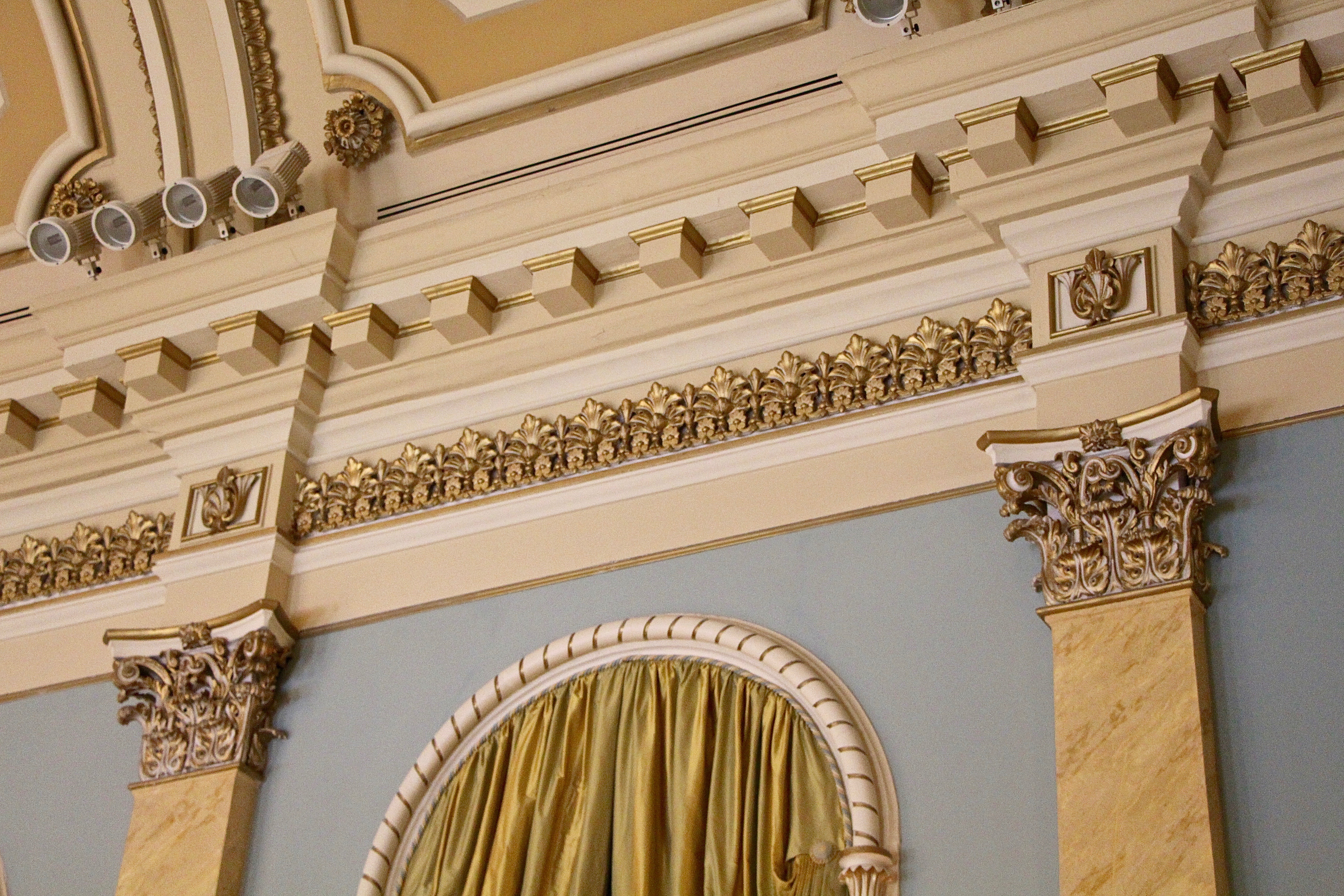
The ballroom's ornamental moulding

A double-height space, the ballroom is lined with tall, arched windows placed between rectangular pilasters that are topped with gilt, acanthused capitals. Cable moulding trim surrounds most of the openings and, around the perimeter of the room, at the intersection of walls and ceiling, is a deep and ornate plaster crown moulding formed by a godroon textured frieze and a heavy dentiled bed-mould between layers of talon and gorge mouldings. Above this is the Victorian, lacunar, clear span vaulted ceiling, from the centre of which hangs a one-ton chandelier, containing 12,000 pieces of Waterford Crystal, that was presented by the British government on Victoria Day in 1951 as a token of gratitude for Canada's role in World War II. The north wall, known as the Sovereign's Wall, is solid and used to display portraits of monarchs or other large paintings. Also, in an alcove off the antechamber to the ballroom is a stained glass window that celebrates the excellence of Canadian performing artists and the establishment of the Governor General's Performing Arts Awards.

The present décor in the ballroom—powder blue walls with beige marbleized pilasters, cream trim, and shades of peach, cream, and old gold on the ceiling, all with gilt highlights—was implemented by Adrienne Clarkson when she was the Queen's representative between 1999 and 2005. By stripping away a more monochrome palette that had been applied to the room in the 1970s, this restored the ballroom to a scheme closer to the original that was in place when the room was first completed in 1872. The carpet, which was the last element of the ballroom's seven-year restoration project, is in "mixed tones of gold, cream, and blue-green," with a lattice pattern over the body of the rug and a twisting acanthus leaf pattern (matching the pilaster capitals) around the border. It was hand-woven, using the low cut and loop technique, by Miritech Carpets in Kitchener-Waterloo, Ontario, which is the only Canadian-owned mill in the country. Miritech also produced the rug in the state dining room. The previously used rug, in place for 16 years, was cut up and reused in secondary rooms and other residences. The new rug covers a floor made of oak set in a herringbone pattern.

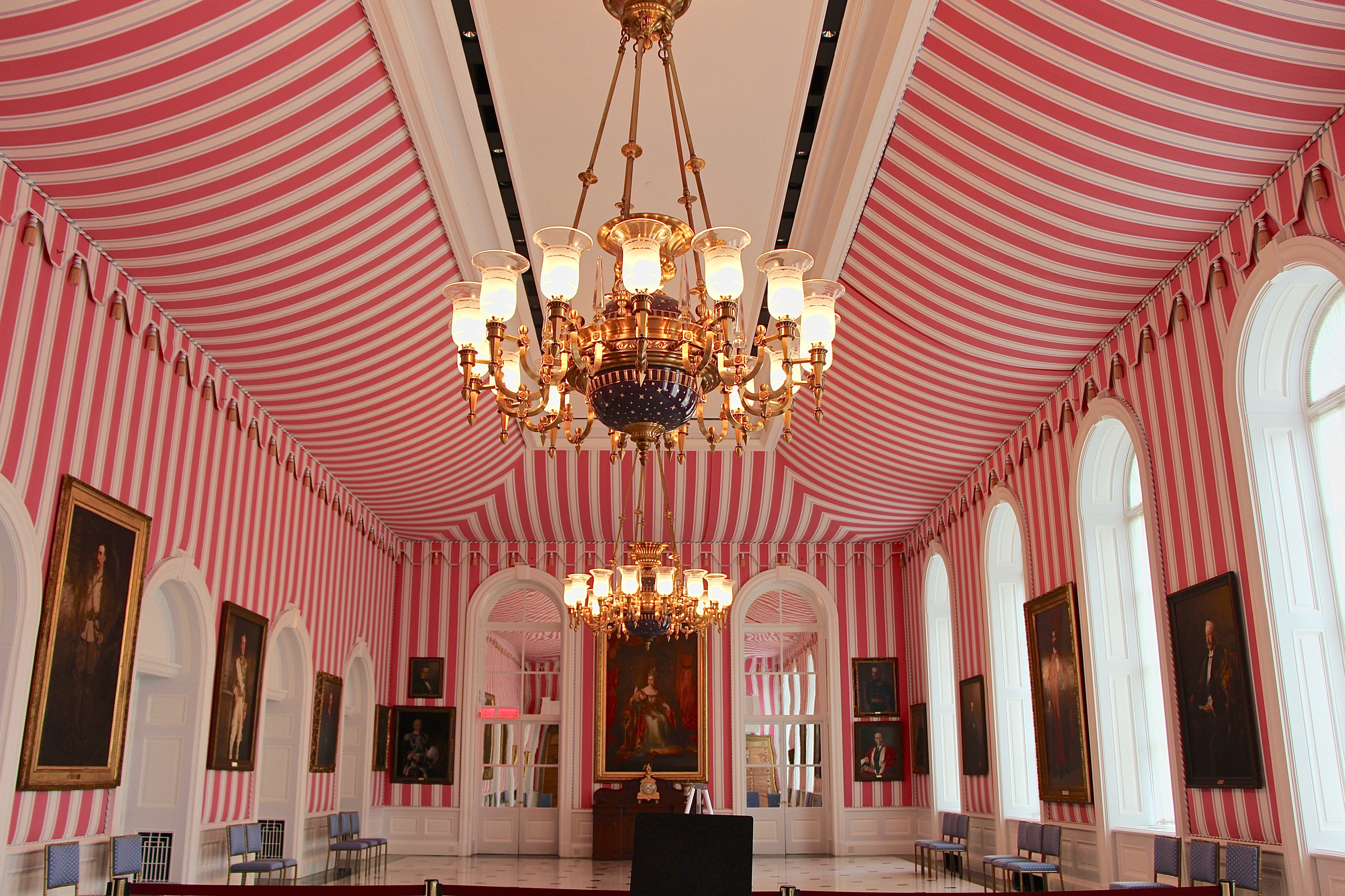
The tent room's appearance is drawn from the early use of striped fabric draped on walls

The appearance of the tent room is inspired by the earlier use of striped fabric, draped on the walls and hung in swaths from the ceiling, in order to temporarily transform what was normally the tennis court into a hall for banquets and parties. The room today has a wall covering of vertically striped, red and gold fabric with a padded backing, which rises to meet the same fabric, hung in a swag fashion outwards from a single coffer in the centre of the ceiling and trimmed around the perimeter of the room with a scallop edged valence of simple passementerie and tassels. This gives the space an overall resemblance to the interior of a large tent. The west wall of the room is broken by series of windows, each paired with a double door into the long gallery on the opposite wall, and, between them, a continuous frame and panel wainscoting. All this woodwork, including the door frames and other trim, is painted in a gloss white to contrast with the textured and patterned wall fabric.

=== Monck wing ===
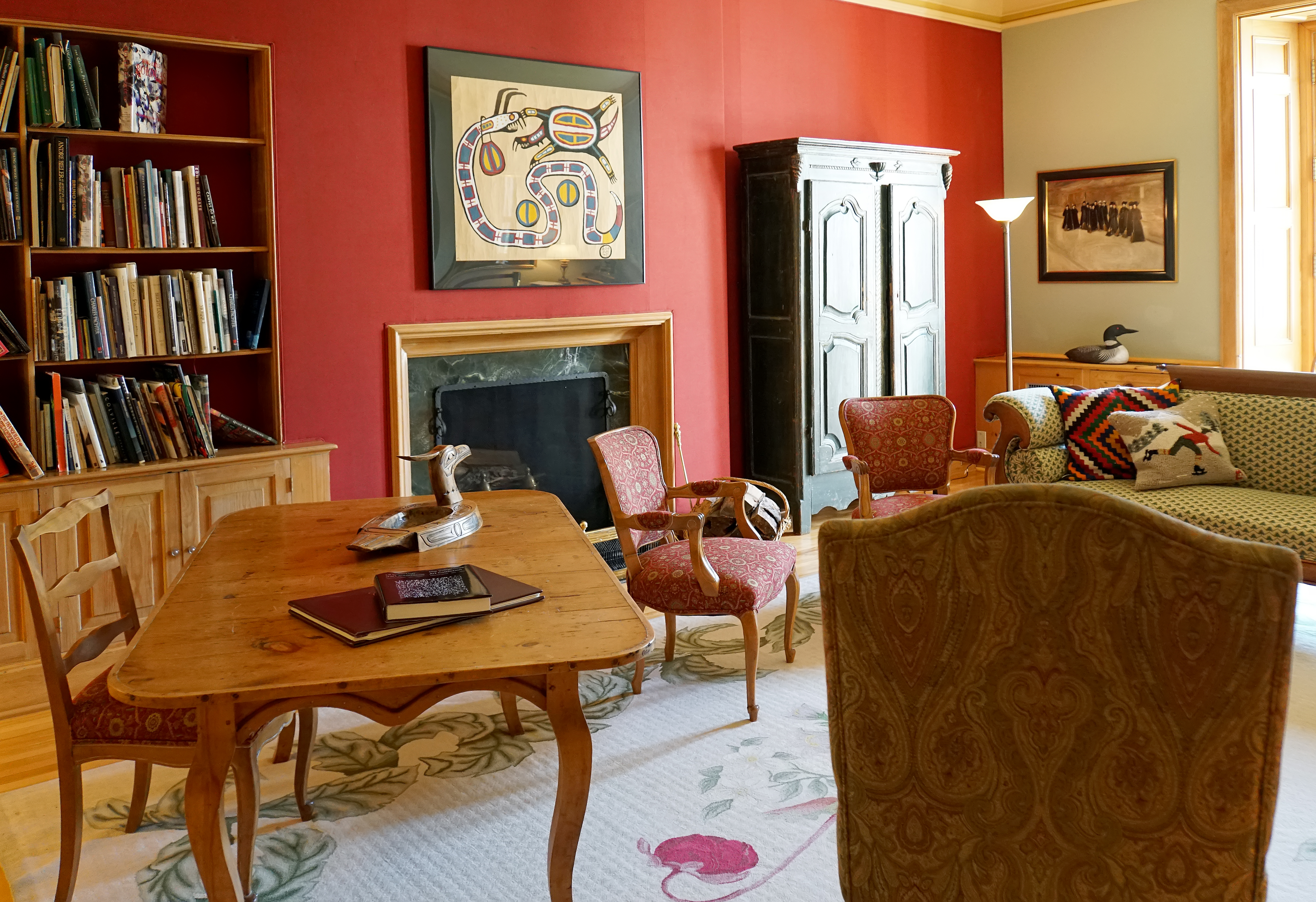
The Pauline Vanier room contains furniture and other cabinetry works crafted by Canadians

Within the Monck wing, built between 1865 and 1866, are other living quarters and drawing and dining rooms generally for non-state affairs, such as the Pauline Vanier room, a small sitting room where informal meetings are held with visiting heads of state and other officials. The room was originally created in the 1960s by Pauline Vanier out of an old aide-de-camp smoking room, giving the space pine panelling and filling it with antique furnishings from Quebec. However, it was later again refurbished to remove the tongue and groove planks Vanier had installed and which were said to be reminiscent of suburban basement panelling popular in the 1970s. The Pauline Vanier room today contains furniture and other cabinetry works by Canadian artisans, as well as works by Canadian artists such as Kenojuak Ashevak, Emily Carr, and Norval Morrisseau.

For more formal gatherings both before and after state events, as well as for entertaining visiting heads of state and their party, the large drawing room, on the south side of the Monck wing, is used. Previously called the red salon, the space underwent thorough renovations in 1901, updating it to the Edwardian style that was popular at the time, giving it boiserie panelling formed from plaster mouldings, a layered crown moulding, as well as windows and doors with chambranled montants, the latter openings also equipped with moulded, classical overdoors. On the walls of the drawing room are hung portraits depicting the viceregal consorts of previous governors general. Directly across the hall from the large drawing room is the state dining room, which is reserved for state dinners for visiting heads of state with smaller parties, with the table seating a maximum of 42 guests. in 1909, the dining room, too, was renovated to a similar Edwardian look, but its present day layout did not emerge until the late 1940s, after various subsequent renovations. The sterling silver sets on display in this room are on loan from Buckingham Palace.

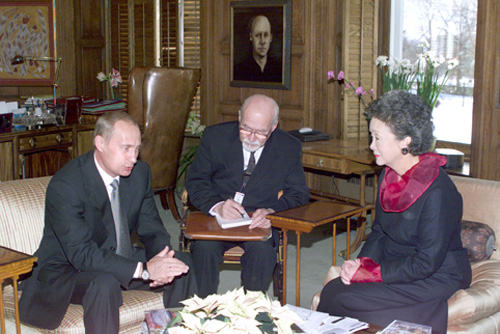
Governor General Adrienne Clarkson (right) with Russian president Vladimir Putin (left) in the governor general's study, 2000

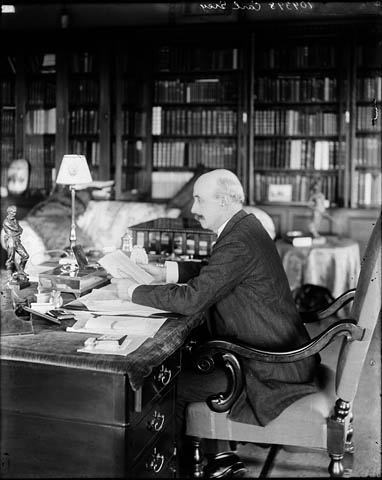
Governor General the Earl Grey in the governor general's study, 1909

The governor general's study sits at the far east end of the Monck wing's ground floor, next to another study allocated for the viceroy's consort. The former is panelled in carved wood that was installed when the room was constructed in 1906, with the names of each governor general applied in succession around the room, below the dado rail and a rendition of the sovereign's arms for the United Kingdom as a focal piece above the fireplace (reflecting the era in which the room was fitted). When the prime minister arrives for an audience with the governor in the viceroy's study, they use the dedicated prime minister's entrance, which is on the north side of the Monck addition, and opens into the easternmost of the wing's two staircases, from which it is only a short walk to the viceroy's office. Across from the study, the library contains a complete collection of Governor General's Literary Award winning works. (Note: See Governor General's Awards § Governor General's Literary Awards.) This room began as a bedroom for Lady Monck, later becoming the governor general's office, a boudoir, the military secretary's office, a smoking room, a flower room, and a card room, before being assigned its current role in 1952.

Further, the Monck wing houses another, smaller drawing room and a billiard room. The viceregal suite, consisting of a study/living room, a large bedroom, and a kitchenette, is at the far west end of the upper floor. Also on the second level is the royal suite (the bedroom being the former parlour of the McKay villa) and the other guest bedrooms, each being named for a former British governor. The descendants of these men were approached in the 1990s with a request for donations of historical memorabilia, to which, amongst others, the Devonshires—relations of the ninth Duke of Devonshire—responded with a Regency mirror that had been used at Chatsworth House. On that floor is also a chapel, installed during the Michener period, and which was made ecumenical and opened on 2 July 1967, in the presence of Queen Elizabeth II, for both Anglican and Roman Catholic services.

=== Art ===
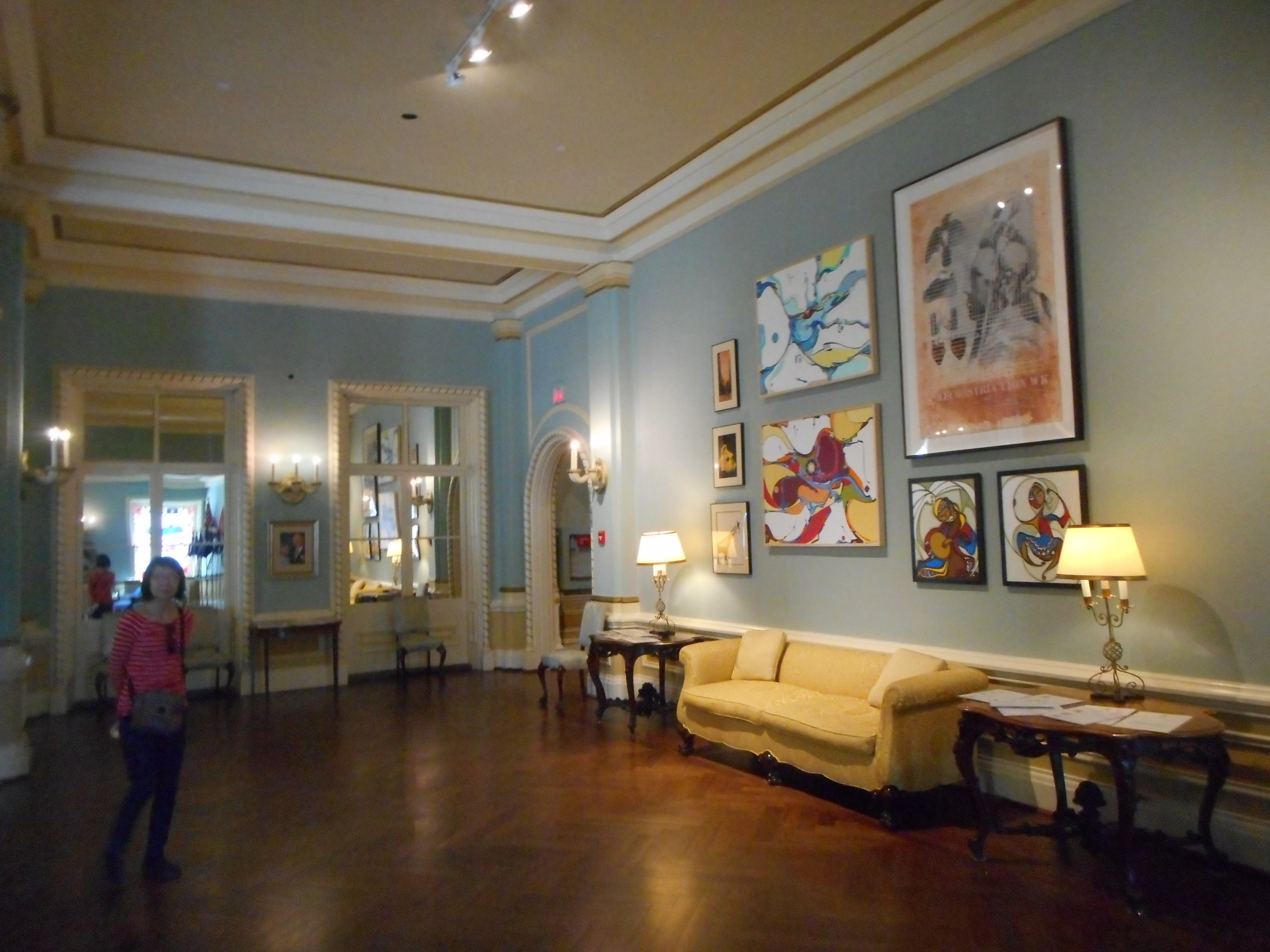
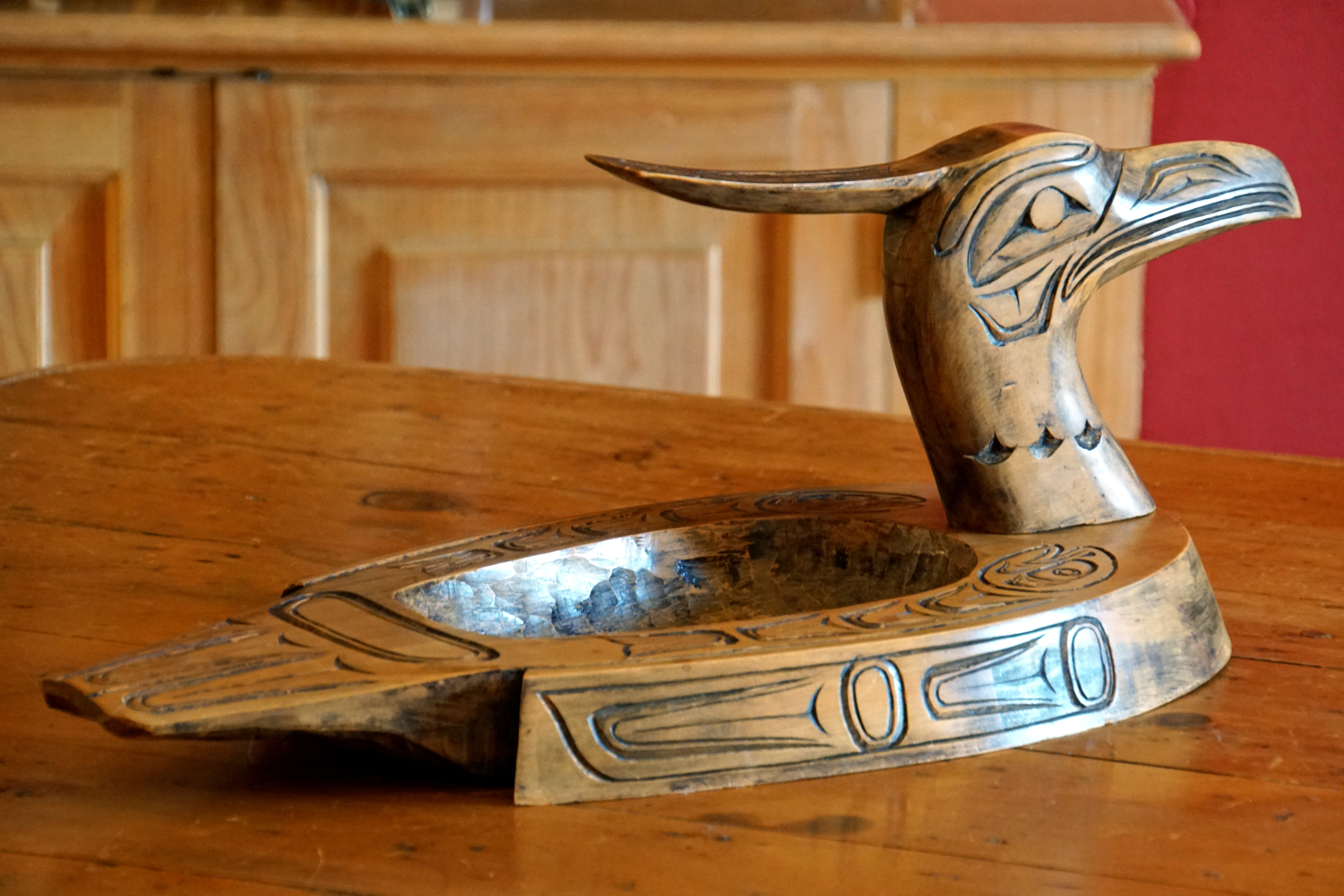
(Clockwise from top) works of art in the antechamber to the ballroom; a Haida carving in the Pauline Vanier room; the portrait of Governor General Jeanne Sauvé by Cleeve Horne

Originally, most of the art in Rideau Hall was the personal property of the incumbent governor general and, as with much of the furnishings, was removed upon the end of the viceroy's commission. Starting in the 20th century, however, more and more pieces, including objets d'art, paintings, sculptures, books, furnishings, and rugs, were added to the dedicated Crown Collection for Government House, either through gifts or purchases; for instance, in 1946, Sir James Dunn presented the Crown with two paintings by Johann Zoffany. Today the collection of furnishing, art, and artifacts at Rideau Hall is composed of private gifts from the Canada Fund (a foundation created by the government of Canada) and the Friends of Rideau Hall. The pieces, though predominantly Canadian in origin—including works by Lawren Harris, Emily Carr, Jean Paul Lemieux, Bill Reid, William Kurelek, Jean-Paul Riopelle, and Allen Sapp—also represent the Far East, Europe, and other regions and can be arranged thematically, such as the Asian-influenced pieces in the long gallery and the portraits of Canadian governors general in the reception room. The Crown Collection works on display are also usually augmented with approximately 100 art pieces and antiques on loan from various museums, galleries, and private collections; this continues a tradition started in the 1930s, when the National Gallery lent pieces to the viceroy at the time, the Earl of Bessborough. In Adrienne Clarkson's words, "the mix of furniture and other objects here now reflects the country, the people who came and settled here, and became part of the Canadian story."

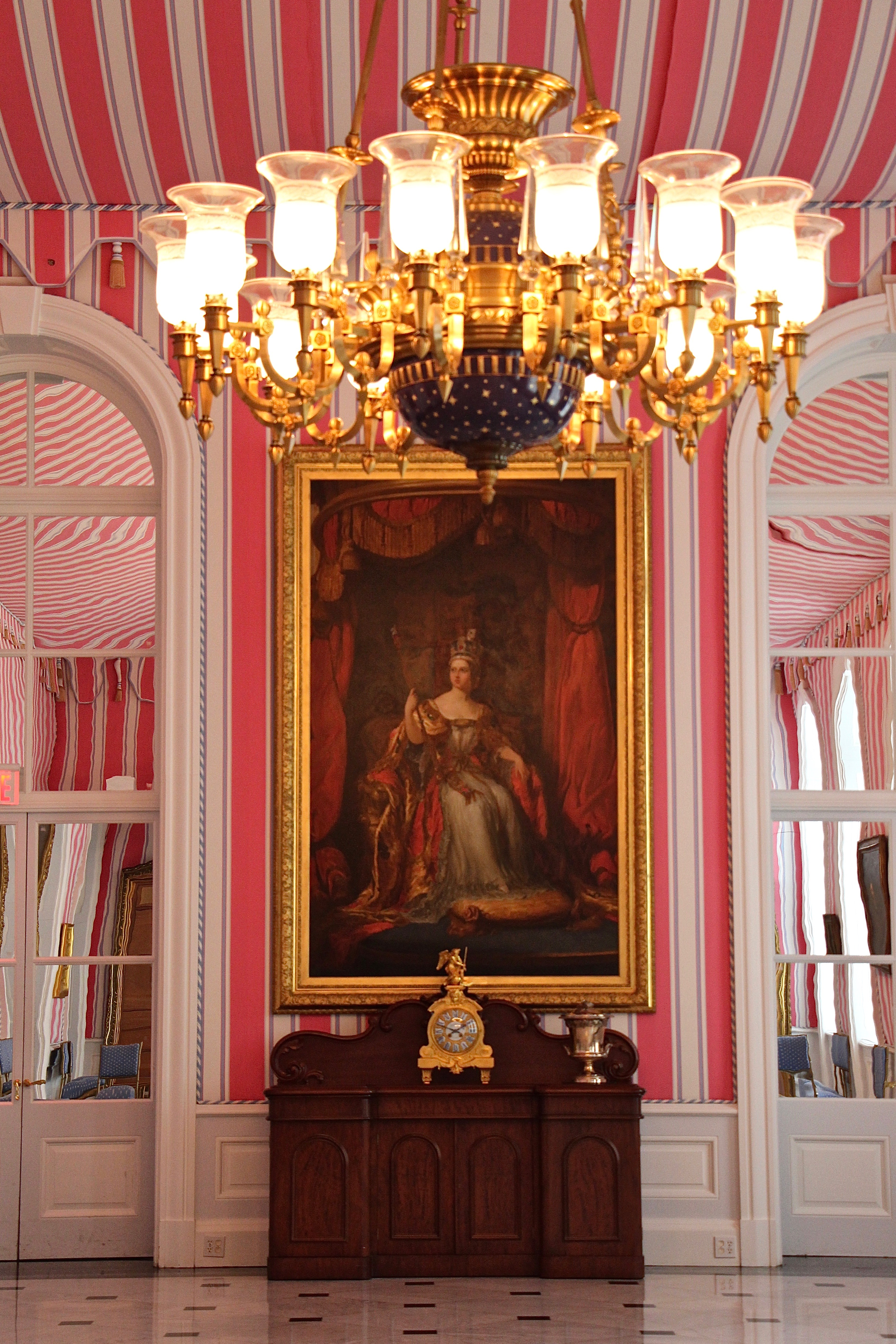
A copy of George Hayter's portrait of Queen Victoria in the tent room

Additionally, since the time of Clarkson's appointment, themed artistic exhibitions have been mounted at Rideau Hall, such as that during the tenure of Michaëlle Jean wherein the show "Body and Land" featured select silkscreen prints from the artist's book The Journals of Susanna Moodie by author Margaret Atwood and artist Charles Pachter. What had been praised during Clarkson's tenure, however, was soon critiqued when it was revealed that into Jean's appointment, Rideau Hall's interpretation and exhibition planner, Fabienne Fusade, was removing from sight the portraits of Canada's past and present sovereigns and other members of the royal family, in order to fulfill Jean's wish to make the vice-regal residence a showcase for Canadian art and give "a strong image of Canada"; (Note: Fusade called the portraits "anachronisms" and said they "did not fit any more with the current role of the governor general.") the portrait by Jean Paul Lemieux of Queen Elizabeth II and the Duke of Edinburgh that had for decades dominated the focal wall of the ballroom was shifted to the rear wall, thereby bumping the copy of George Hayter's state portrait of Queen Victoria that had hung there to the tent room, where the portraits of Canada's British governors general had been collected together. These moves and removals were criticized by the editorial board of the National Post, as well as other journalists, (Note: Dan Gardner said in the Calgary Herald that "The idea behind all this is to ease the Queen out of the country's consciousness and constitution.") as having "demoted and ghettoized" history in order to "siphon off the great symbolic power of the monarchy, to further [the staff's] particular tastes and agendas," noting that Rideau Hall should not be used "primarily [as] an art gallery."

== Grounds ==
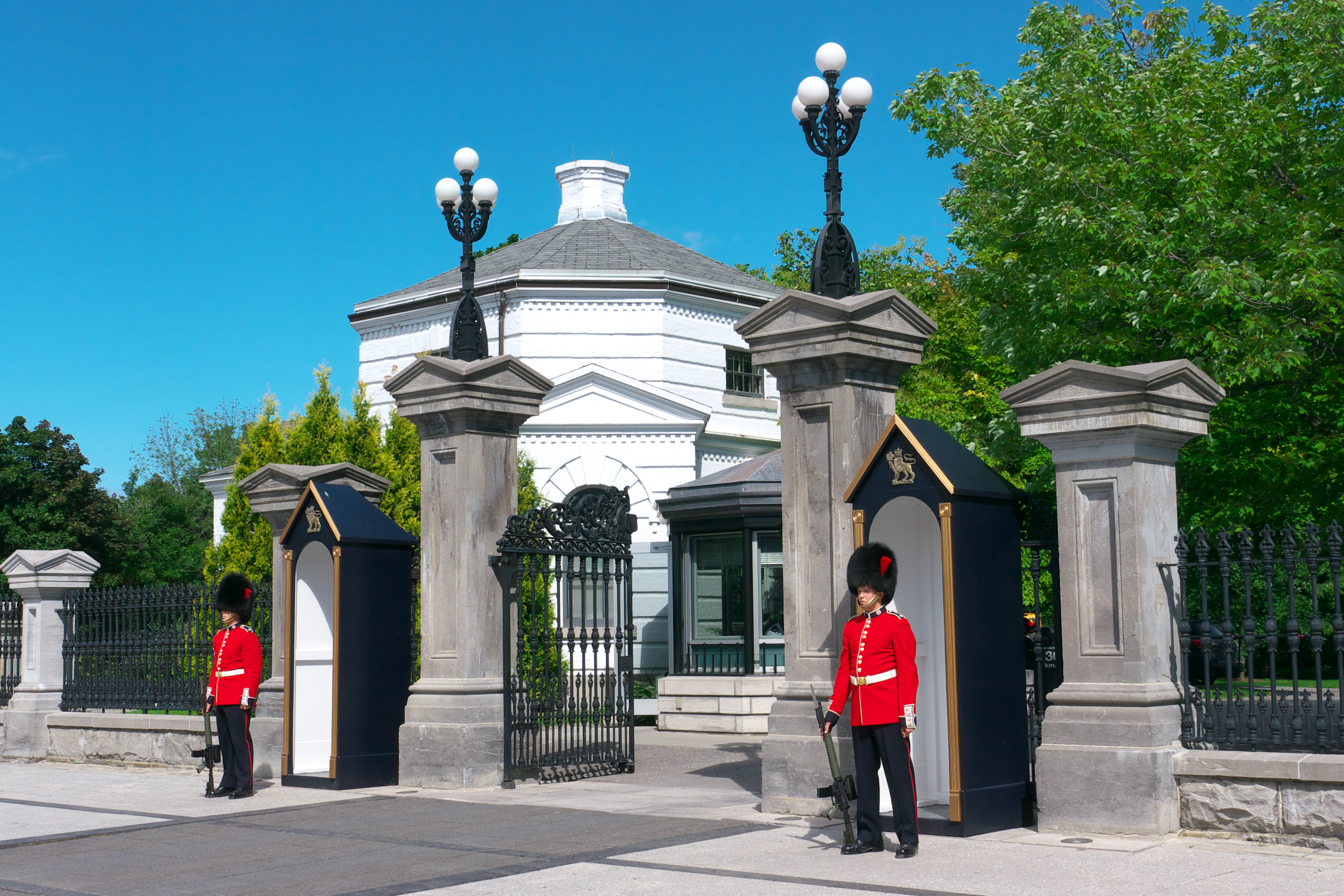
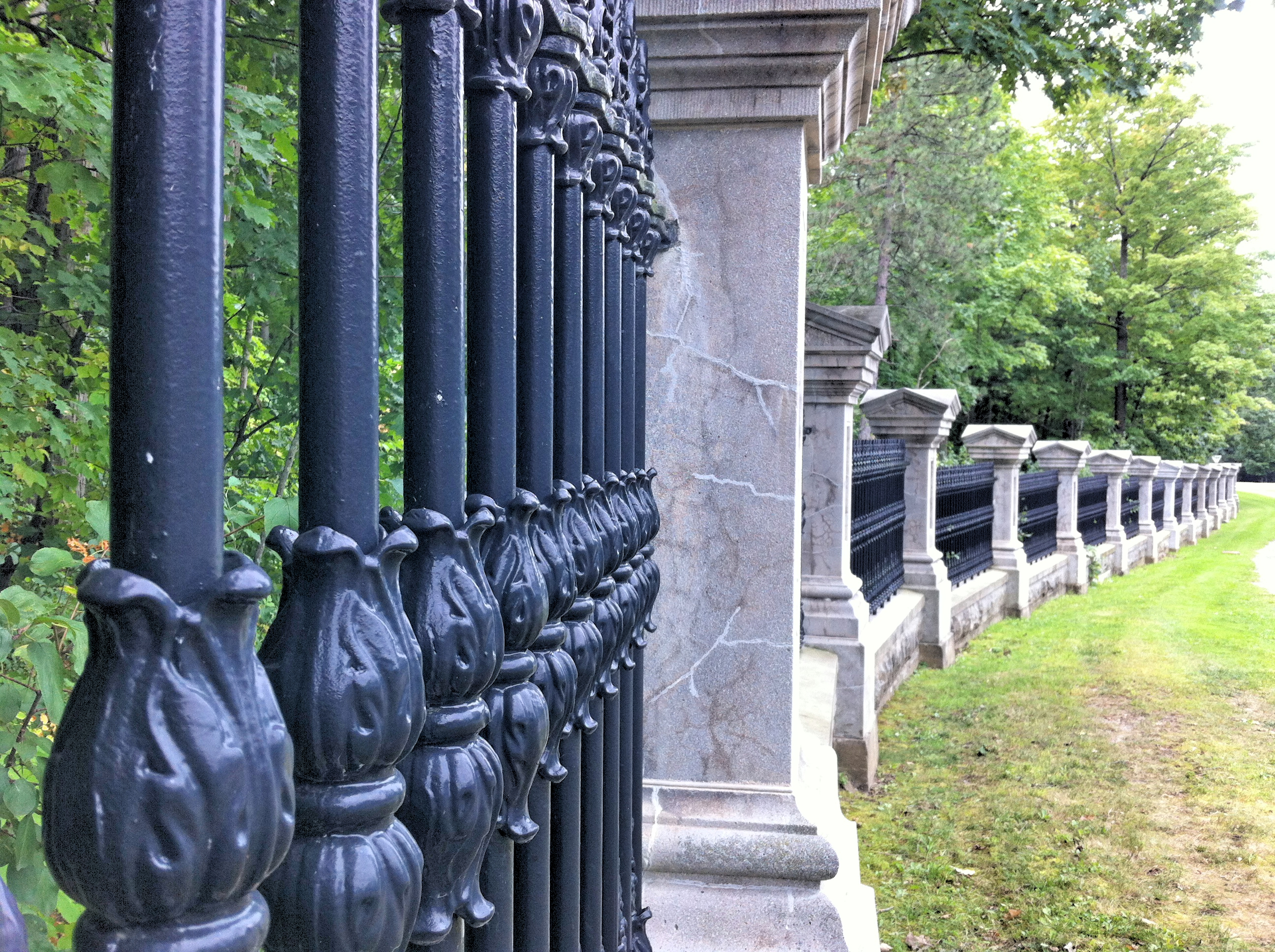
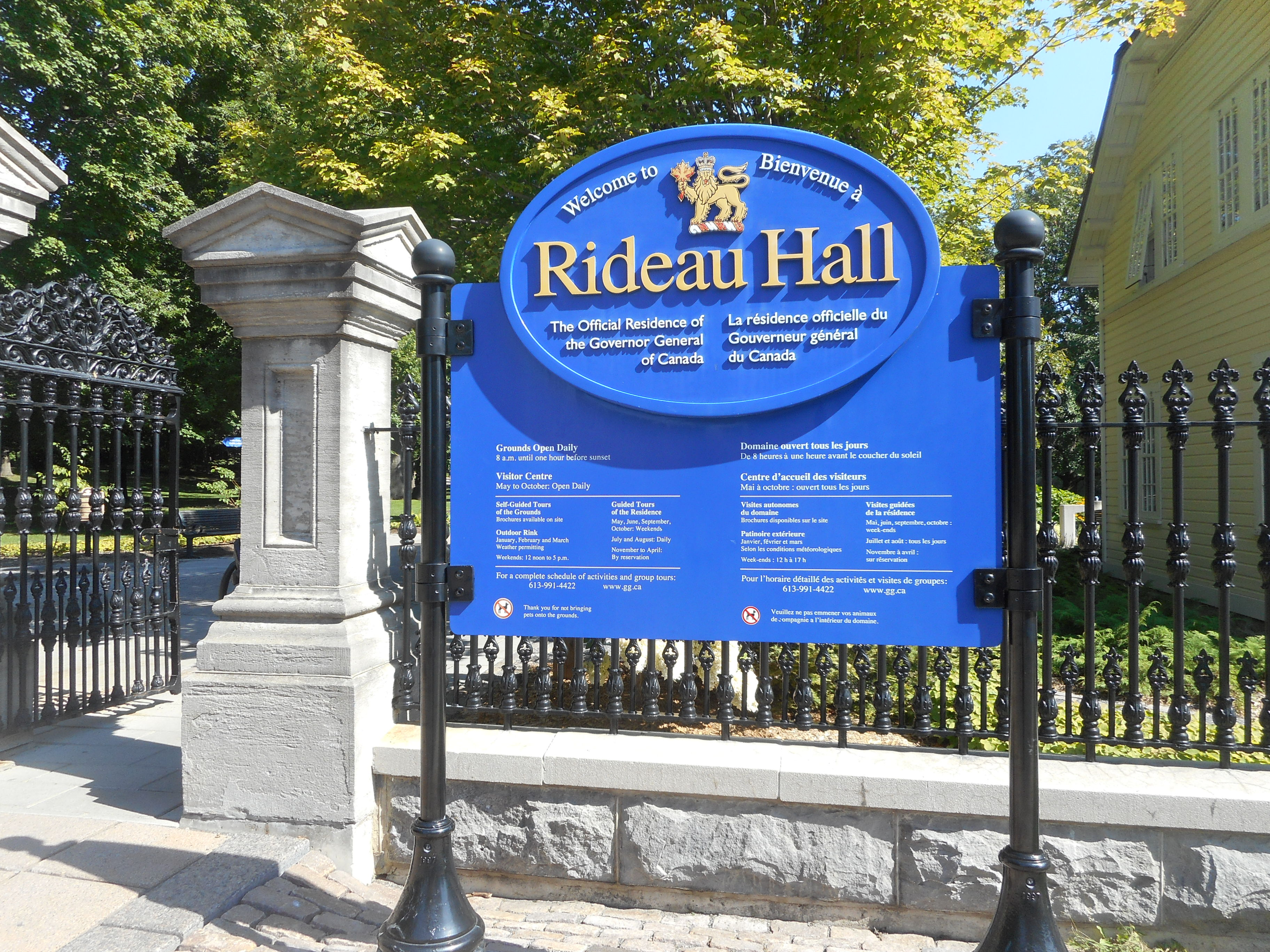
(Clockwise from top) sentries from the Governor General's Foot Guards at the entrance of the property; the sign at the main gate; the wrought iron fence as it runs along Princess Avenue

Rideau Hall's 0.36-square-kilometre (88-acre) contains uniquely Canadian landscapes designed in the natural and formal styles, including broad lawns, groves of trees (there are over 10,000 trees on the property), and meandering roads and pathways. The property is surrounded by a 2,500-metre-long (8,200 ft) Victorian style cast iron and cast stone fence put up from 1928 into the 1930s. The Main Gate and adjacent Gate Lodge were designed by Frederick Preston Rubidge and constructed between 1867 and 1868; the gates themselves were produced by William Glendinneng Manufacturer of Montreal. The light fixtures atop the piers to either side of the gate were added at a later date. These elements, the Gate Lodge, and the fence and other gates were together designated as a federal heritage building on 16 January 1987. The piers and ironwork of the perimeter fence were modelled on those of the Main Gate.

The entire site is divided into five distinct areas: the wooded entrance park (trees, groundcover, daffodils, and lawn), the open parkland (meadow), the sugar bush, the ornamental gardens, and the farm (out-buildings and open area). The last once included a herd of cattle and fields used to grow hay, but today the only remaining agricultural ventures are the vegetable and herb gardens that have been worked since the time of the McKay family. From these fields, plants, fruits, and edible flowers are used in the palace kitchens, and a greenhouse and flower garden provide flowers for the hall and other government buildings in Ottawa. Further, during the early spring months, the maples throughout the property are tapped for syrup making. In total, more than 10,000 trees grow on the grounds. Additionally, there is a one-kilometre-long (0.62 mi) honorary segment of the Trans Canada Trail on the property.

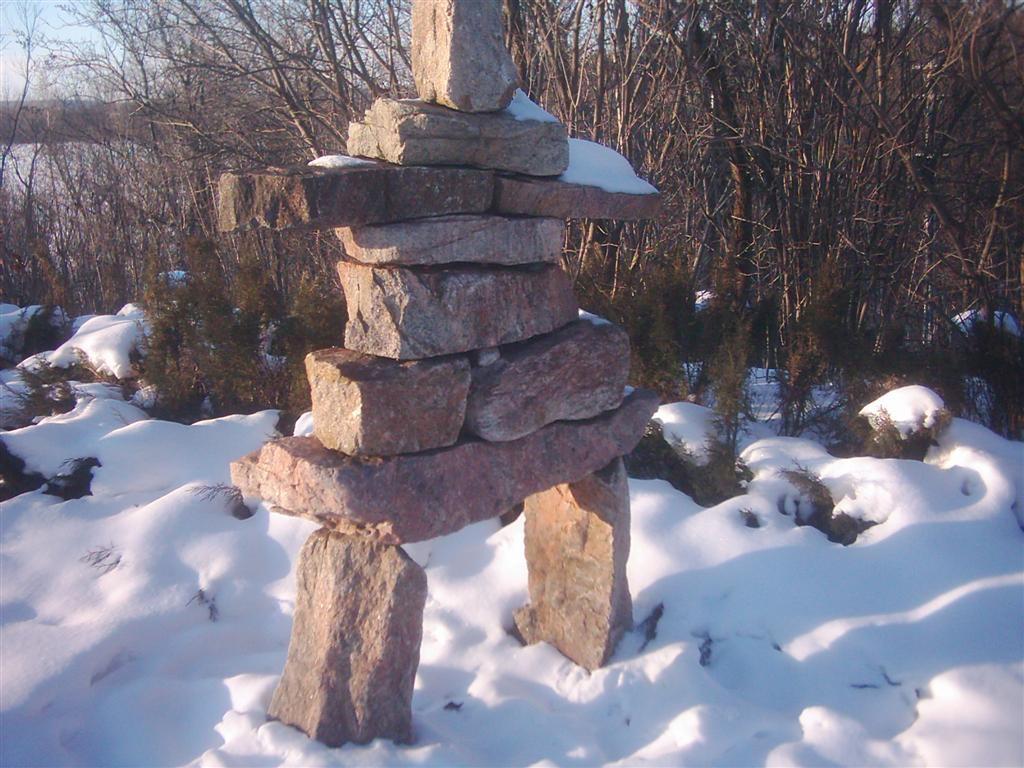
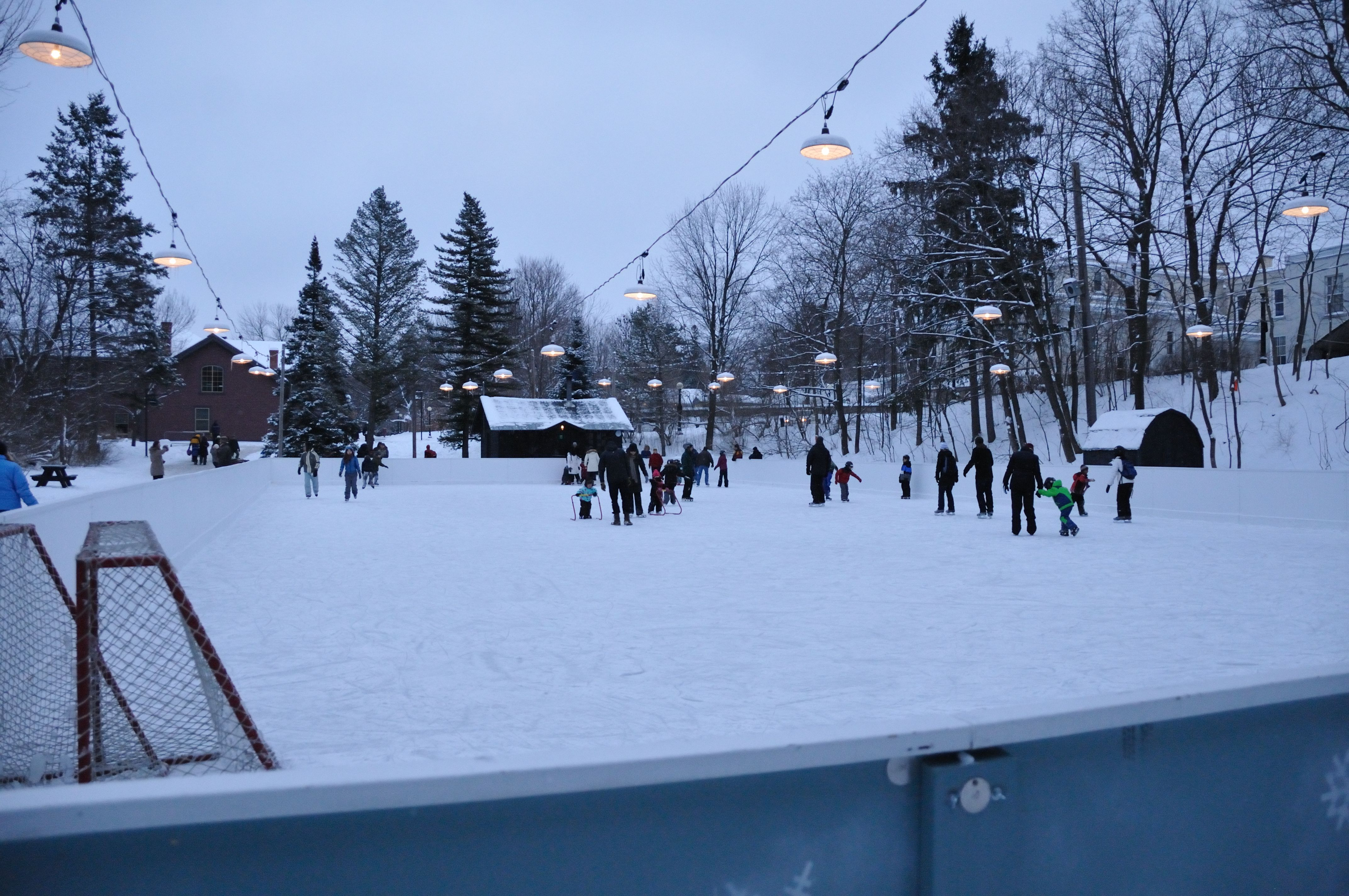
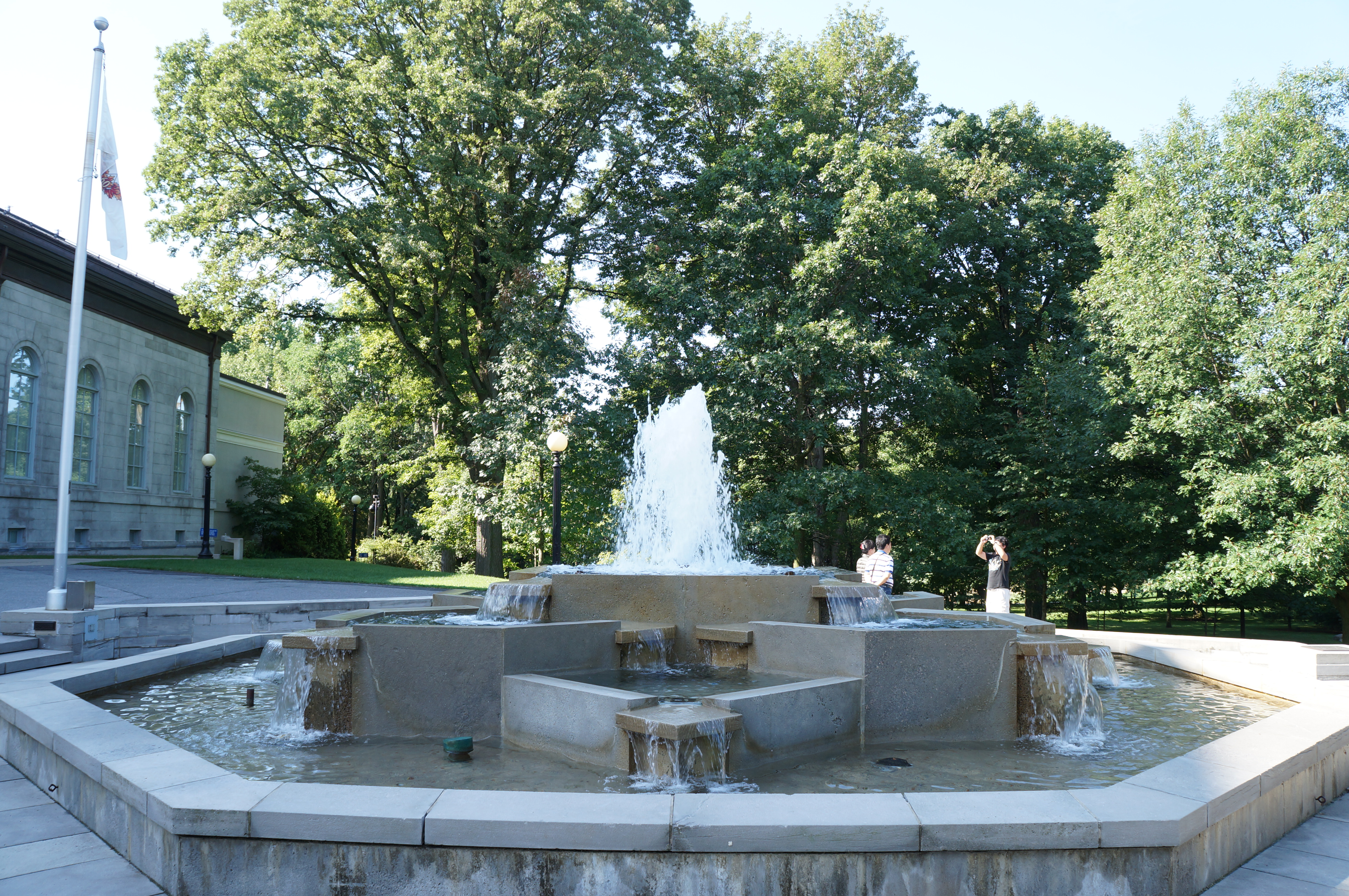
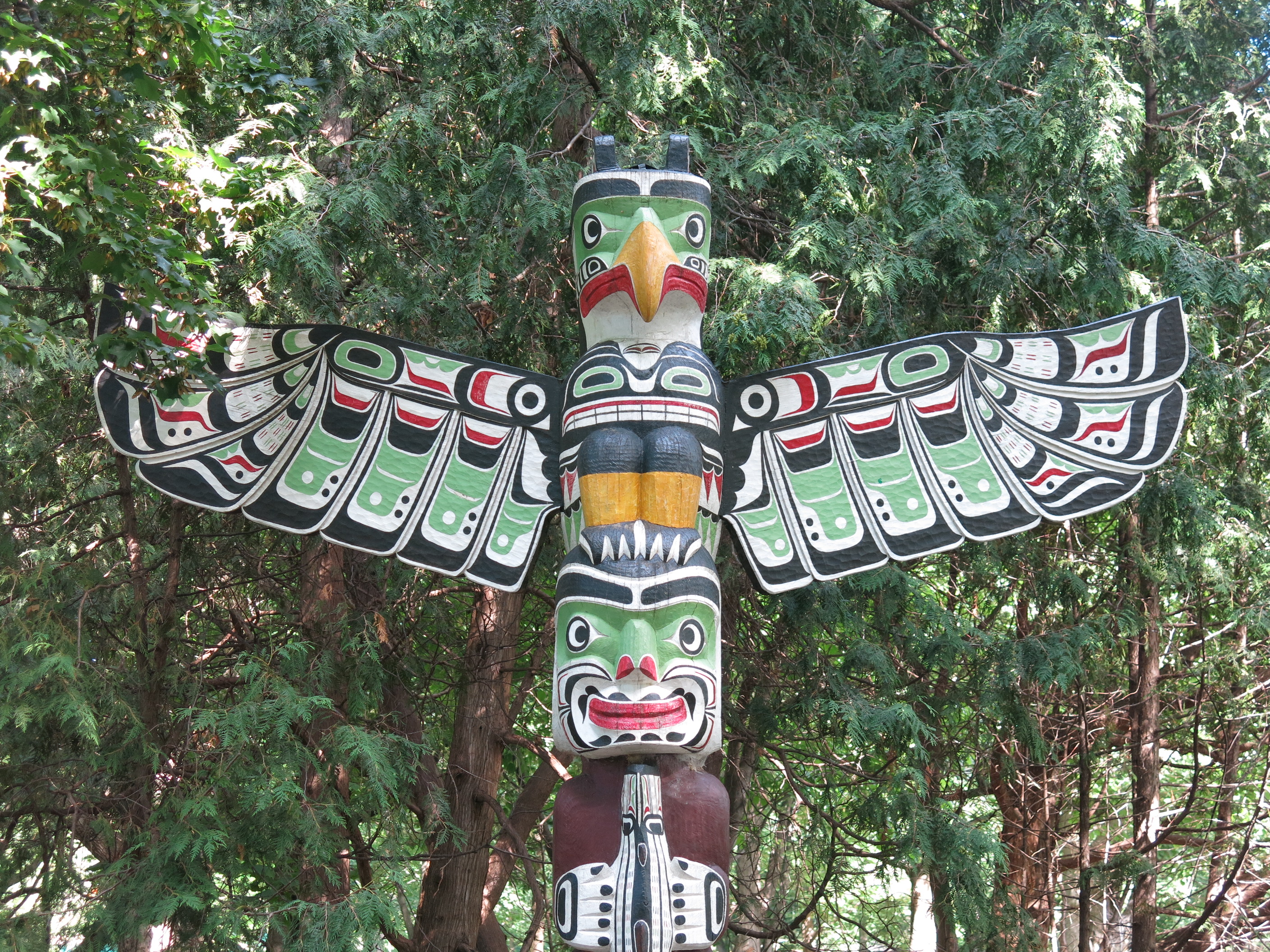
(Clockwise from top) the inukshuk created by Kananginak Pootoogook and erected in 1997; the Fountain of Hope in the forecourt; the skating rink on the grounds of Rideau Hall; the totem pole by Mungo Martin

As with the house that sits on them, the grounds too were transformed throughout the decades: Lady Byng created the existing rock garden, with a reflecting pool and wild corner for growing trilliums and orchids; a totem pole by Kwakiutl carver Mungo Martin was gifted to the Earl Alexander of Tunis by the Lieutenant Governor of British Columbia-in-Council; the Fountain of Hope was initiated by Gerda Hnatyshyn to mark the International Year of Disabled Persons, built in front of Rideau Hall, and dedicated to Terry Fox; and an inukshuk by artist Kananginak Pootoogook, from Cape Dorset, Nunavut, was built to commemorate the second National Aboriginal Day, in 1997. The Canadian Heritage Garden is a formal rose garden championed by Gerda Hnatyshyn and constructed to mark the 125th anniversary of Confederation. Also, each member of the royal family or visiting dignitary to Rideau Hall is asked to plant a tree; as such, the park, mostly along the main drive, is dotted with nearly 100 trees with small plaques at their bases listing the name and office of the person who planted each particular tree. These include Queen Elizabeth the Queen Mother; Diana, Princess of Wales; Charles, Prince of Wales (later King Charles III); King George VI; and numerous by Queen Elizabeth II. Foreign dignitaries who have planted trees include John F. Kennedy, Jacqueline Kennedy Onassis, Richard Nixon, Bill Clinton, Kofi Annan, Boris Yeltsin, Vladimir Putin, Vicente Fox, and Emperor Akihito.

Throughout their history as a royal park, the gardens have hosted numerous activities and events. The earliest governors general added amenities such as a curling rink, a skating pond (which remains in operation, making it one of the oldest rinks in North America), toboggan runs, (Note: A toboggan run some 700 metres in length was cut through the forest in 1897, allowing sleds to slide right down to the Ottawa River and, in 1903, the Countess of Minto formed the Minto Skating Club and held amateur competitions at Rideau Hall each year.) tennis courts, and the like, and many of the guests at Rideau Hall would partake in these outdoor activities, including Prime Ministers William Lyon Mackenzie King and Robert Borden, who would often skate on the iced over pond with the viceregal family. Of the tobogganing, Lieutenant William Galwey, a member of the survey team that laid out the Canada–United States border and later visited Rideau Hall in November 1871, said: "It is a most favourite amusement at Government House. Ladies go in for it. I think they like rolling over and over with the gentlemen."

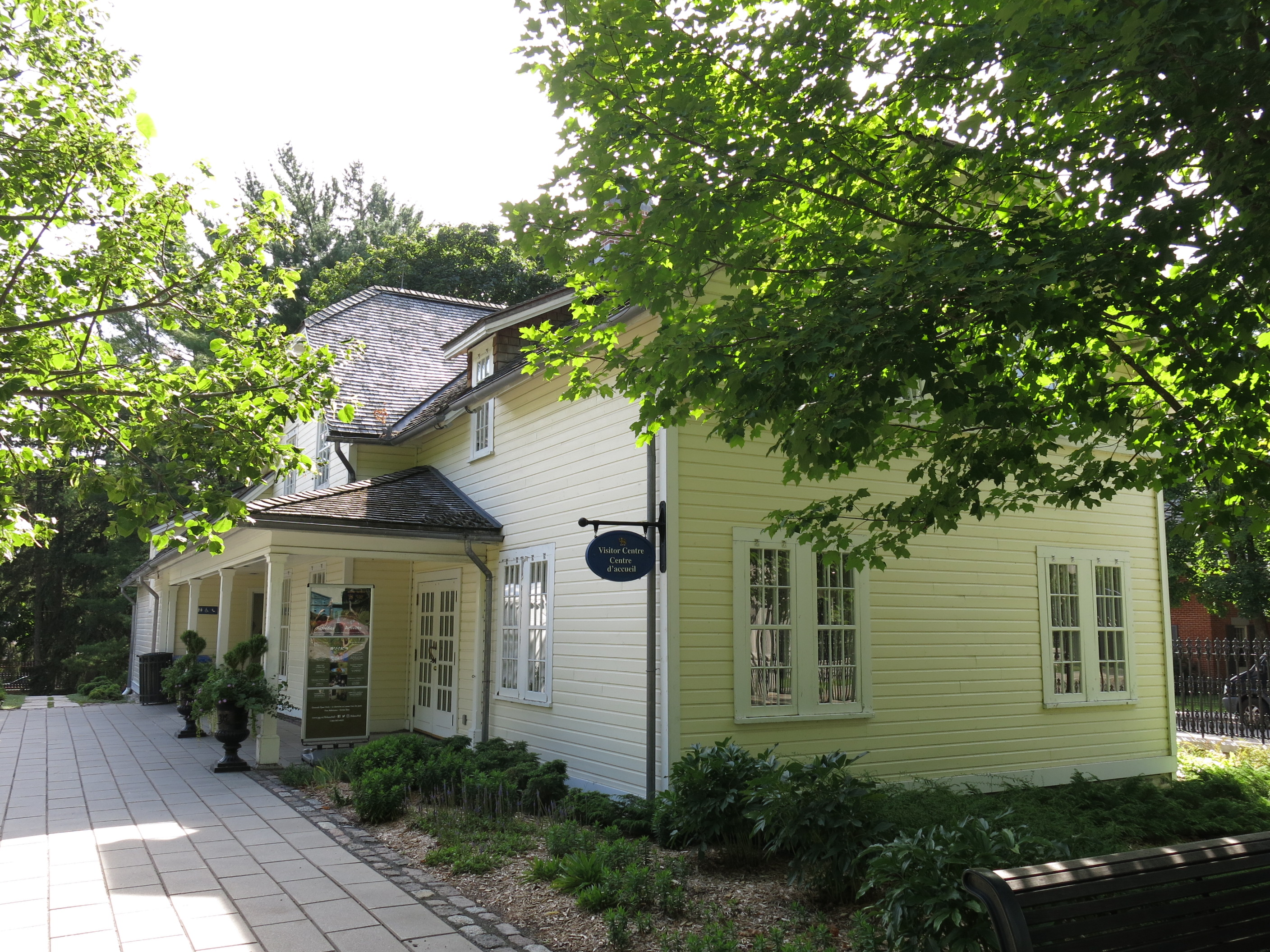
The Visitor Centre is used to facilitate tours of the property

The grounds of Rideau Hall have been open to the public since 1921, when the Lord Byng of Vimy's aide-de-camp resolved to open Government House to "all who had a right to be there," a move that outraged the traditionalists. Today an expanded Visitor Centre (formerly the gardener's cottage) has been established to facilitate tours.

Garden parties are held by the viceroy in the summer months, continuing the tradition started by the Lord Lisgar in 1869, and each year the governor general holds a New Year's Levée, an event that traces its roots back to the French royal government and which welcomes guests from the public to attend and participate in skating, sledding, and refreshments. The park also hosts the Rideau Hall Cricket Association and Ottawa Valley Cricket Council, which continues the tradition of cricket being played in the vice-regal residence's gardens, beginning when the cricket pitch was laid out by the Viscount Monck in 1866. Matches continue to be played at the hall during summer weekends.

=== Other structures ===
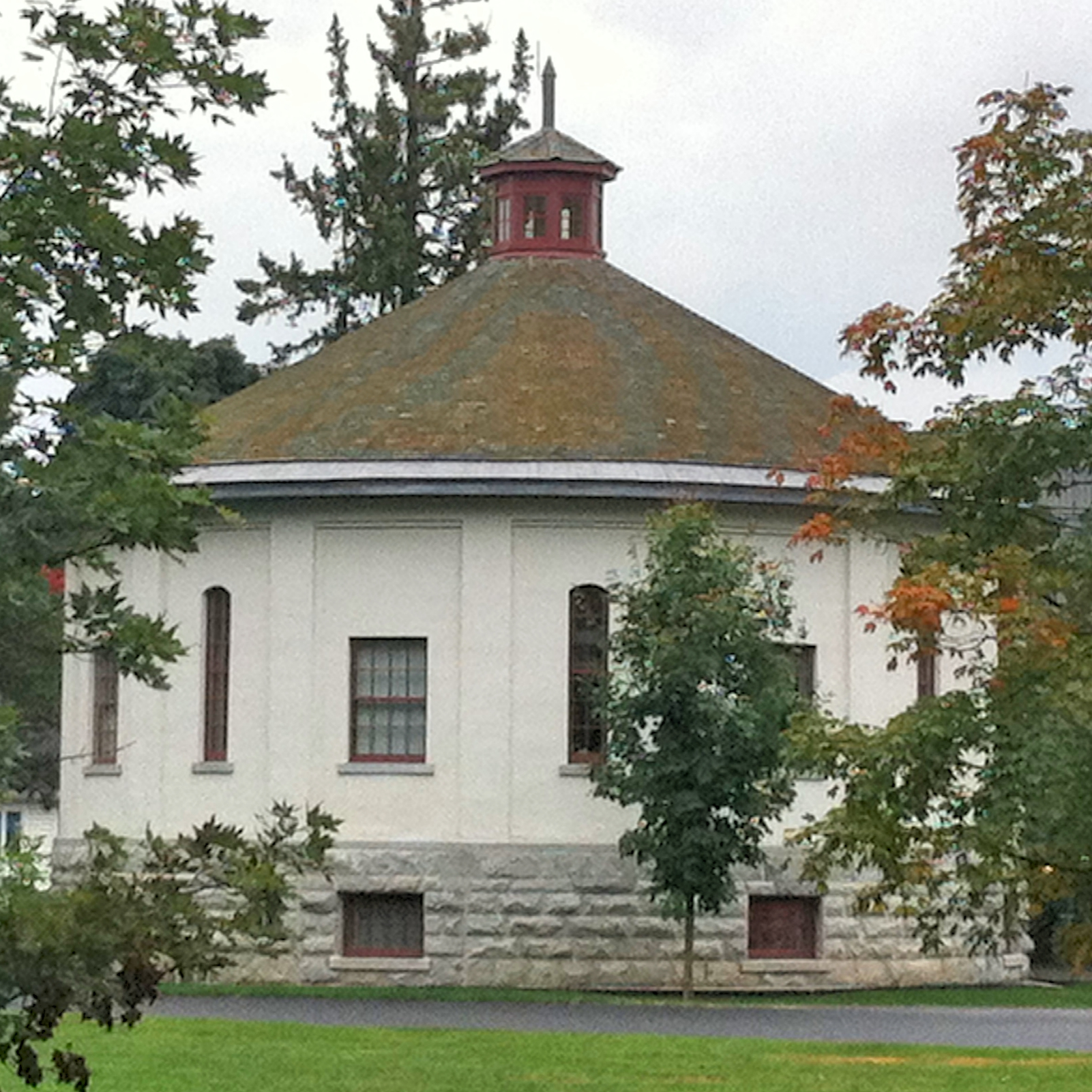
The Dome Building on the grounds of Rideau Hall, 2018

Other than Rideau Hall itself, there are 27 buildings around the property, including Rideau Cottage (currently serving as a temporary official home for the Prime Minister and his family); offices for the Royal Canadian Mounted Police, National Capital Commission, and Public Works and Government Services Canada; the Governor General's Foot Guards' House; the Gasometer or Dome Building (built in 1877 as storage for coal gas used for lighting in Rideau Hall); the Visitors Centre; the Farm Building; and stables. Additionally, there are six greenhouses.

=== Surrounding properties ===
Though not on the grounds of Rideau Hall, St Bartholomew's Anglican Church is located across MacKay Street on property once belonging to the MacKay Villa estate. It is regularly used by governors general and their families and sometimes by the sovereign and other members of the royal family, as well as by viceregal household staff, their families, and members of the Governor General's Foot Guards, for whom the church also is a regimental chapel. Also nearby is 7 Rideau Gate, which is a guesthouse for distinguished visitors of the Crown situated just outside and facing onto the forecourt of the main gate of Rideau Hall.

== See also ==
- Government Houses in Canada – Type of official residences
- List of buildings in Ottawa
- List of palaces
