= Mary Simon =

Governor General of Canada from 2021 to 2026

The Right Honourable Mary Simon CC CMM COM OQ CD FRCGS
- ᒥᐊᓕ ᓴᐃᒪᓐ
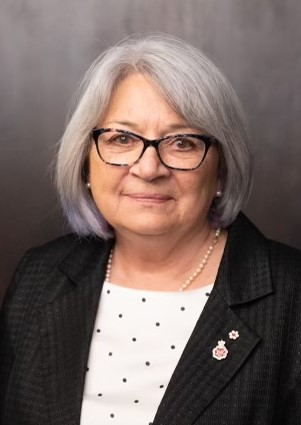
- Simon in 2022

30th Governor General of Canada
- In office July 26, 2021 – June 8, 2026
- Monarchs: Elizabeth II; Charles III
- Prime Minister: Justin Trudeau; Mark Carney
- Preceded by: Julie Payette
- Succeeded by: Louise Arbour

13th President of the Inuit Tapiriit Kanatami
- In office 2006–2012
- Preceded by: Jose Kusugak
- Succeeded by: Terry Audla

Canadian Ambassador to Denmark
- In office August 11, 1999 – January 15, 2002
- Prime Minister: Jean Chrétien
- Preceded by: Brian Baker
- Succeeded by: Alfonso Gagliano

Canadian Ambassador for Circumpolar Affairs
- In office October 31, 1994 – January 19, 2004
- Prime Minister: Jean Chrétien; Paul Martin
- Preceded by: Position established
- Succeeded by: Jack Anawak

Chair of the Inuit Circumpolar Conference
- In office 1986–1992
- President: Rhoda Inukshuk; John Amagoalik; Rosemarie Kuptana
- Preceded by: Hans-Pavia Rosing
- Succeeded by: Caleb Pungowiyi

Personal details
- Born: Mary Jeannie May; August 21, 1947 (age 79) Fort Severight, Quebec, Canada
- Spouses: Robert Otis (m. 1967, divorced) George Simon (divorced) Whit Fraser (m. 1994)
- Children: 3
- Relatives: Johnny May (brother)
- Education: Kuujjuaq Federal Day School; Fort Carson High School
- Occupation: Broadcaster; public servant; diplomat
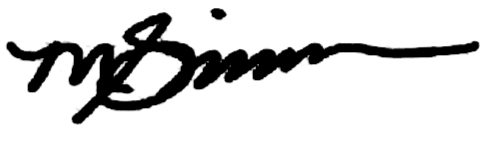
- Signature

Mary Jeannie May Simon (Note: In Inuktitut syllabics: ᒥᐊᓕ ᓴᐃᒪᓐ; Inuktitut: Ningiukudluk;) (born August 21, 1947) is a Canadian civil servant, diplomat, and former broadcaster who served as the 30th governor general of Canada from 2021 to 2026. She is Inuk on her mother's side, making her the first Indigenous person to hold the office. (Note: Indigenous persons have previously been appointed to provincial viceregal offices.)

Simon was born in Fort Severight (now Kangiqsualujjuaq), Quebec. She briefly worked as a producer and announcer for the CBC Northern Service in the 1970s before entering public service, serving on the board of the Northern Quebec Inuit Association and playing a key role in the Charlottetown Accord negotiations. She was Canada's first ambassador for circumpolar affairs from 1994 to 2004, as well as a lead negotiator for the creation of the Arctic Council. She also served as the Canadian ambassador to Denmark from 1999 to 2002.

Simon was appointed Governor General following the resignation of Julie Payette in 2021, having been nominated by Prime Minister Justin Trudeau to represent Queen Elizabeth II. Her tenure included the Queen's Platinum Jubilee, a visit by Pope Francis to Canada, and the ascension of King Charles III following Elizabeth's death. In 2026, at the end of her five-year term as Governor General, she was succeeded by jurist Louise Arbour.

== Early life and education ==
Simon was born Mary Jeannie May on August 21, 1947, in Fort Severight (now Kangiqsualujjuaq), Quebec, to Bob May, who was from Manitoba and of English descent, and to her mother, Nancy, an Inuk. Her father had relocated to the north in his youth and became manager of the local Hudson's Bay Company (HBC) store during the early 1950s. He said that he was the first white employee to marry an Inuk, which the HBC banned at the time. Mary Simon's Inuk name is Ningiukudluk, which means "bossy little old lady".

Simon was raised in a traditional Inuit lifestyle, including hunting, fishing, sewing Inuit clothing, and travelling by dog sled. She credits her mother and maternal grandmother Jeannie Angnatuk for passing on Inuit oral history to her.

Simon attended federal day school in Fort Chimo (now Kuujjuaq), then Fort Carson High School in Colorado, and completed her high school via correspondence in Fort Chimo.

== Career ==
=== Early career ===
Simon taught Inuktitut at McGill University. From 1969 to 1973, she worked as a producer and announcer for the CBC Northern Service.

Simon began her career as a public servant by being elected secretary of the board of directors of the Northern Quebec Inuit Association. In 1978, she was elected as vice-president, and later president, of the Makivik Corporation. She held the position until 1985.

During this period she also became involved with Inuit Tapiriit Kanatami, Canada's national Inuit organization. Simon was one of the senior Inuit negotiators during the patriation of the Canadian Constitution, the First Ministers' conferences that took place from 1982 to 1992, as well as the 1992 Charlottetown Accord discussions.

She served as a member of the Nunavut Implementation Commission and as co-director (policy) and secretary to the Royal Commission on Aboriginal Peoples.

=== Diplomatic career ===
She took on a variety of roles for the Inuit Circumpolar Conference (ICC). First she served as an Executive Council member from 1980 to 1983, then as president from 1986 to 1992, and then as Special Envoy from 1992 to 1994. In 1986, as president of the ICC, Simon led a delegation of Canadian, Alaskan, and Greenland Inuit to Moscow and then to Chukotka to meet with Russian officials as well as the Inuit of the far east of Russia. In 1987 the ICC was successful in efforts that resulted in the Russian government allowing Russian Inuit to attend the 1989 ICC General Assembly held in Alaska.

==== Ambassadorship ====
In 1994, Simon was appointed by Prime Minister Jean Chrétien to be Canadian Ambassador for Circumpolar Affairs, a newly created position she held until early 2004. Acting on instructions from the Government of Canada, she took the lead role in negotiating the creation of an eight-country council known today as the Arctic Council. The 1996 Ottawa Declaration formally established it to include the active participation of indigenous peoples in the circumpolar world. Under her leadership, and later as Canada's Senior Arctic Official, she and its indigenous permanent participants worked closely with those of its seven other states.

During this time, Simon was also the Canadian Ambassador to Denmark (1999–2002), a member of the Joint Public Advisory Committee of the Commission on Environmental Cooperation (1997–2000) and its chairwoman from 1997 to 1998.

Simon was appointed Councillor for the International Council for Conflict Resolution at the Carter Center in 2001.

=== Post-diplomatic work ===
From November 2004 to February 2005, she assisted with the facilitation and write-up of reports on the "Sectoral Follow-up Sessions" announced by Prime Minister Paul Martin following the April 19, 2004 Canada-Aboriginal Peoples Roundtable on Strengthening the Relationship on Health, Life Long learning, Housing, Economic Opportunities, Negotiations, and Accountability for Results. From June 2004 to June 2007, Simon was a board member at the International Institute for Sustainable Development.

From 2004 to 2005, Simon was special advisor to the Labrador Inuit Association on the Labrador Inuit Land Claims Agreement. She was elected president of Inuit Tapiriit Kanatami on July 7, 2006.

In 2010, Simon was reported to be under consideration for Governor General of Canada. David Johnston was ultimately appointed.

== Governor General of Canada ==
=== Nomination ===
Prime Minister Justin Trudeau announcing Mary Simon as the 30th governor general of Canada, 2021

The federal government began a search for a replacement for Governor General Julie Payette following her resignation in early 2021. Simon was reported as a leading contender for the post early on, given her Indigenous heritage and then-political consciousness on Indigenous reconciliation. On July 6, 2021, Prime Minister Justin Trudeau announced that Queen Elizabeth II had approved Simon's appointment as the 30th Governor General of Canada. She received a customary audience with the Queen on July 22, though held virtually (instead of in-person) due to the coronavirus pandemic. She was vested with special appointments as Chancellor of the Order of Canada, the Order of Military Merit, the Order of Merit of the Police Forces and the Order of St. John (within Canada). She also received the Canadian Forces' Decoration. She was formally installed at the Senate of Canada Building on July 26.

Simon's appointment was somewhat unusual, in that although she speaks English and Inuktitut, she is not proficient in French. This raised some complaints from Francophone Canadians for breaking the tradition of French-English bilingualism.

=== Tenure ===
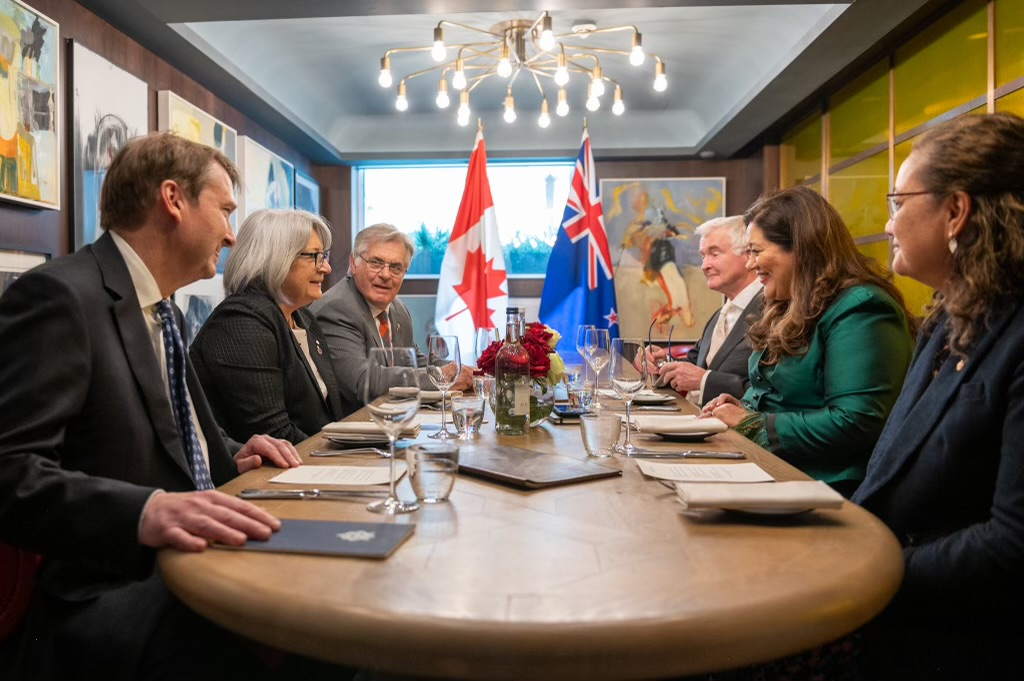
Simon and Dame Cindy Kiro, Governor-General of New Zealand, host a bilateral between Canada and New Zealand during their Platinum Jubilee visit to the United Kingdom, June 2022.

==== Ajuinnata ====
Simon considers the concept of ajuinnata as an important theme for her mandate as governor general. Ajuinnata is an Inuktitut word that does not have a one-word translation, as it encompasses many things: a vow or a promise to never give up, or a commitment to action no matter how daunting the cause may be. Simon said that the word was taught to her by her mother and grandmother, and is an important concept for Inuit. According to Simon, the spirit of ajuinnata drove her to get involved in movements to improve the lives of Inuit in Canada.

==== Germany visit ====
Simon made her first trip abroad as Governor General on October 17, 2021, when she and her husband arrived in Berlin, Germany on a state visit. The trip was Canada's first state visit to Germany in over 20 years. During her visit, Simon met with President of Germany Frank-Walter Steinmeier and Chancellor of Germany Angela Merkel. In an interview with The Globe and Mail, Simon said she discussed with Steinmeier, how in fulfilling the role of head of state, to express and atone for the darkest moments of their countries' history—the Holocaust and the Residential School System. She also attended the Frankfurt Book Fair and a roundtable discussion on Arctic exploration at the Frankfurt Archaeological Museum.

==== Queen's Platinum Jubilee ====
On Accession Day, February 6, 2022, Simon paid tribute to the Queen in a message to mark her Platinum Jubilee. She said:

Much has changed in the last seven decades. We extended the hand of friendship to nations around the world. We made advancements in medical research, most recently with vaccines. We established the Truth and Reconciliation Commission and took part in its work. We saw the first Canadian named governor general, then the first woman and now, the first Indigenous person.

Simon and her husband met the Queen for the first time on March 15, 2022, at Windsor Castle. The Queen hosted afternoon tea for the couple. It was the first time that the Canadian monarch met the first indigenous governor general in Canadian history. Simon later said in an interview that she and the Queen discussed various issues like the 2022 Russian invasion of Ukraine, Canada convoy protests, and how they both recovered from COVID-19. Simon said she told the Queen that Canada's history books should be rewritten to reflect the facts about the relationship between the Canadian Crown and Indigenous peoples of Canada.

In May, Simon hosted Charles, Prince of Wales and Camilla, Duchess of Cornwall on their Platinum Jubilee tour of Canada. During the tour, Simon invested Charles as an Extraordinary Commander of the Order of Military Merit at Rideau Hall.

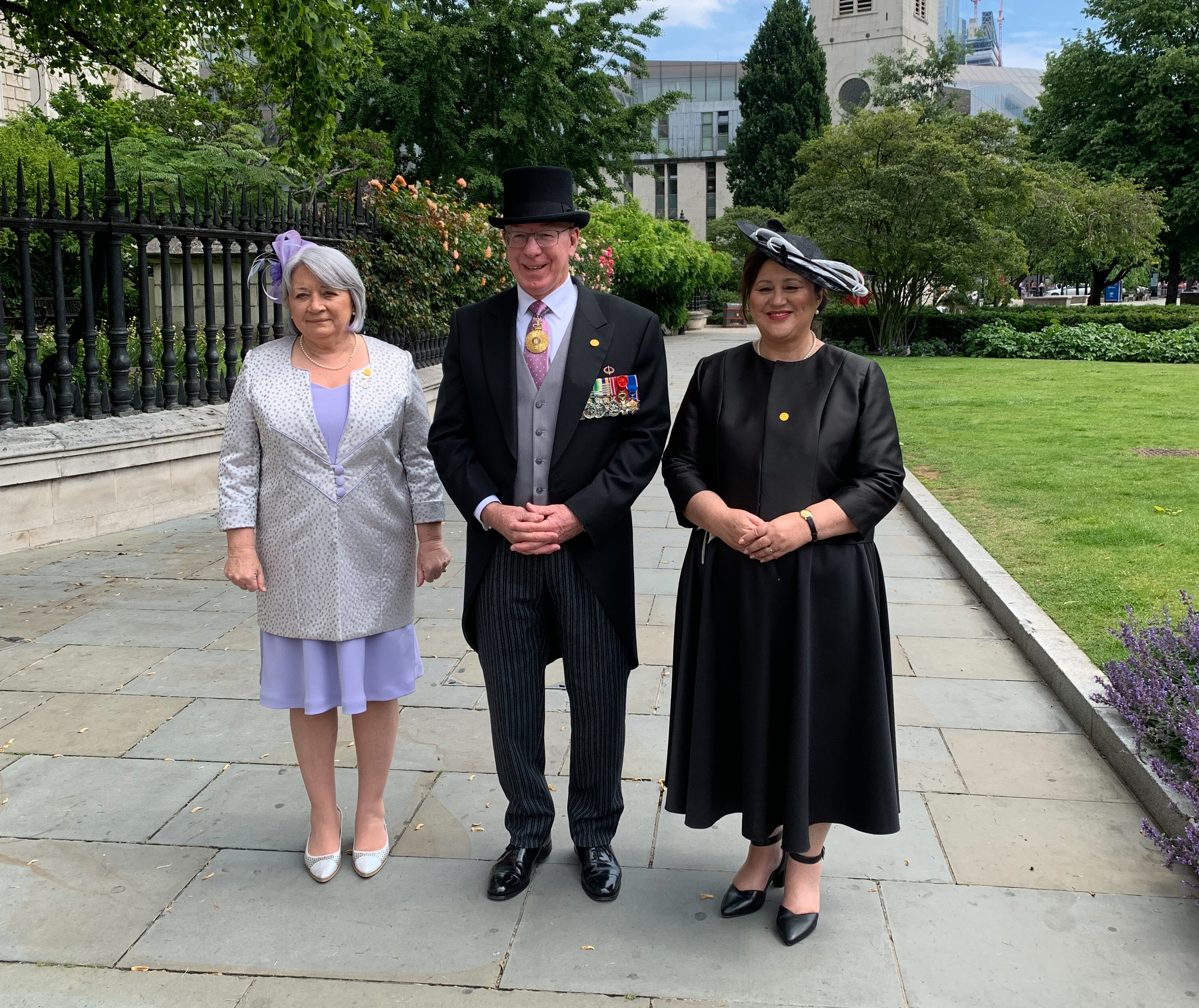
Simon with governors-general David Hurley of Australia and Dame Cindy Kiro of New Zealand, outside St Paul's Cathedral, London, June 3, 2022

Simon and her husband travelled to London from June 2 to 6, 2022, to take part in the Queen's Platinum Jubilee celebrations in the United Kingdom. They attended the Service of Thanksgiving at St. Paul's Cathedral, the Platinum Party at the Palace, and the Platinum Jubilee Pageant, which included military personnel from the Canadian Armed Forces.

Simon urged all Canadians to work together, to "truly honour the life, legacy and reign of Her Majesty The Queen", and said that, to her, that is worth celebrating.

==== Papal visit ====
On April 1, 2022, Simon released a statement following Pope Francis' apology to the Indigenous delegation at the Vatican. Simon said she was grateful to the Pope for his words, and hailed it as a "historic and emotional day for Indigenous peoples across Canada". She said that the apology is "one step on the road to reconciliation", and the Pope has "committed to visiting Canada to continue the reconciliation journey with Indigenous peoples on their own lands".

Pope Francis visited Canada from July 24 to 29, 2022, with Simon taking part in several events and activities during the papal visit. Following the papal apology in Maskwacis on July 25, Simon said, "Today was a day that moved us forward, giving Survivors words that may help them heal. Yet it is also a day that can raise complex emotions, especially as the Papal visit continues".

==== Transition of the Crown ====
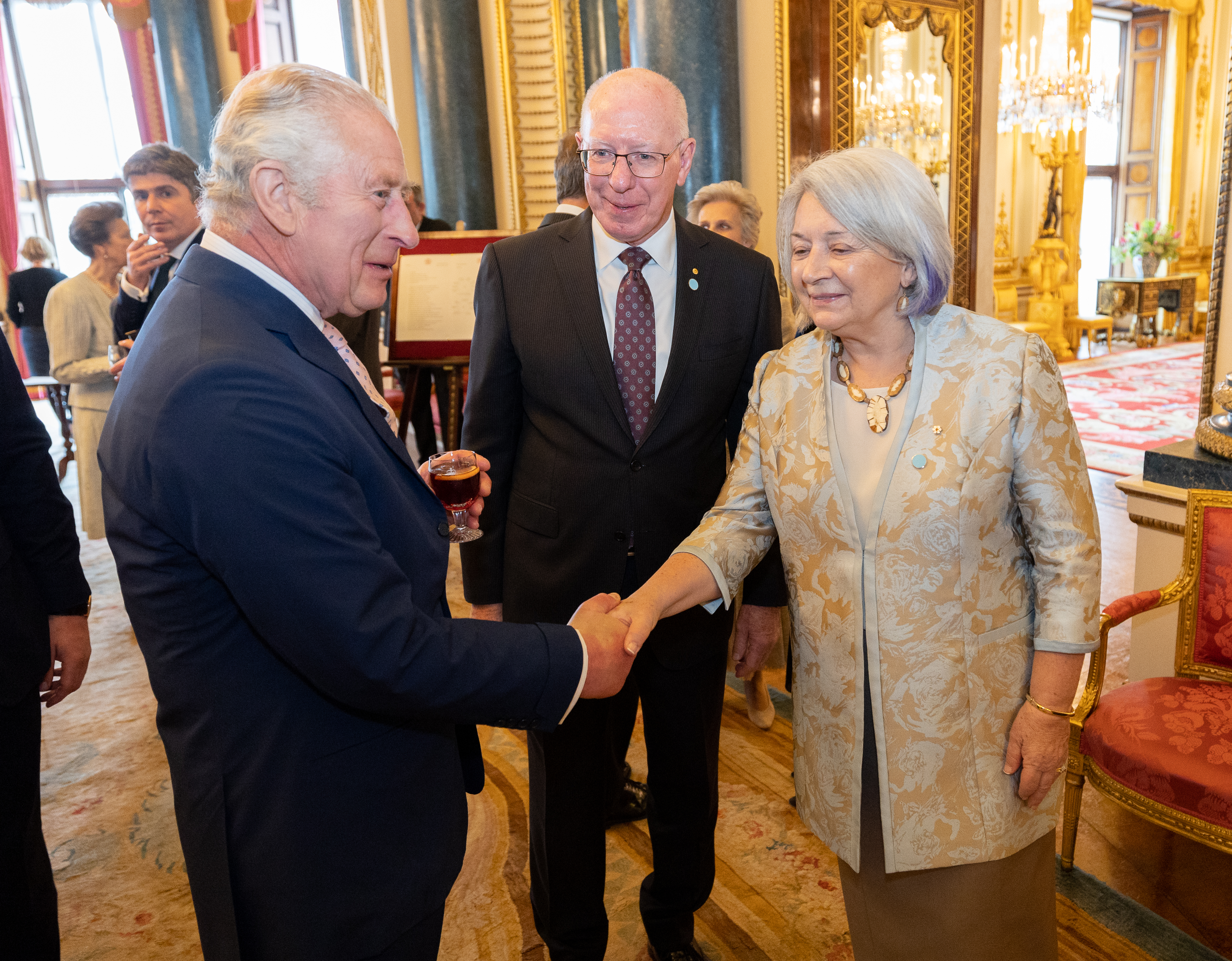
Simon meeting King Charles III at Buckingham Palace, May 5, 2023

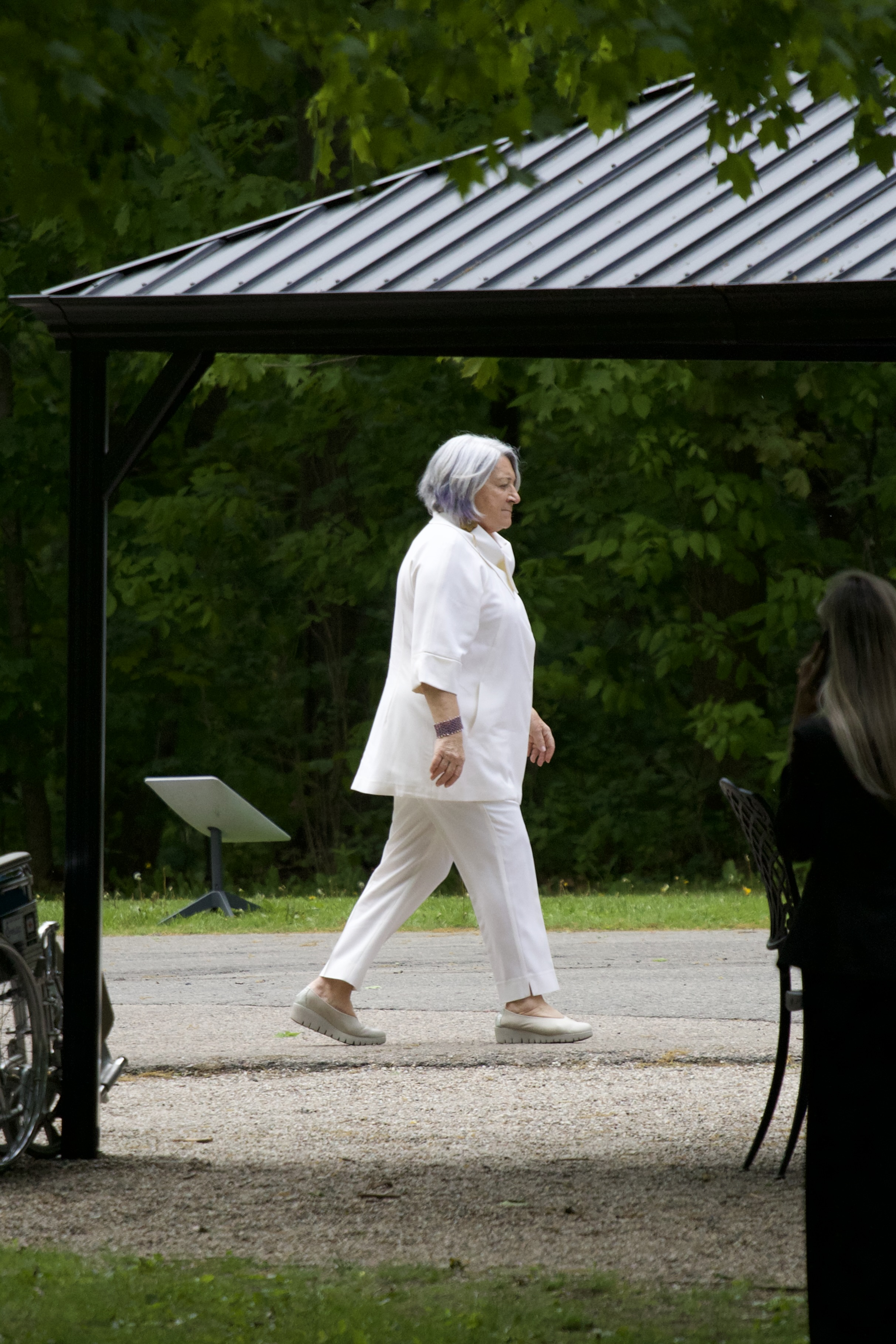
Simon during the 2025 royal tour of Canada

With Queen Elizabeth II's death on September 8, 2022, Simon became the first governor general to serve under two monarchs since Lord Tweedsmuir in 1936. Simon said, "Her Majesty's warm welcome when we spent time with her earlier this year was a profound moment in our lives and a memory we will cherish forever". In a live statement to Canadians, Simon said, "Her Majesty cared about people, about our well-being. This was clear every time we spoke. She cared about Canada, and all the unique stories that make up our beautiful country".

On September 10, Simon signed the proclamation of the accession of King Charles III at Rideau Hall following a formal meeting of the King's Privy Council for Canada. In a statement, Simon said, "the Crown endures and thrives as a symbol of service, tradition and commitment. His Majesty The King ascends at an important time in history for Canada and the Commonwealth".

Simon and her husband were part of the Canadian delegation to the Queen's state funeral in London on September 19. On the occasion of the Queen's funeral, Simon said, "We were fortunate to have The Queen with us for so long. On behalf of all Canadians, I would like to thank our Queen, our monarch, one last time, for her love and her commitment to our country and our people".

In May 2023, just days before the coronation of King Charles III, Simon organised an audience at Buckingham Palace between the King and three Indigenous leaders: Assembly of First Nations National Chief RoseAnne Archibald, President of Inuit Tapiriit Kanatami Natan Obed, and President of the Métis National Council Cassidy Caron. Simon said that the King "understands the importance of walking the path of reconciliation with Canada and Indigenous peoples".

Simon and her husband attended a reception hosted by the King on May 5, and the Coronation Service at Westminster Abbey on May 6. For the coronation, Simon wore a Canadian creation by a Nunavik born artist. In a statement, Simon said:

Seventy years have passed since the last Coronation, offering us an opportunity to reflect on all that has changed in our country, the Commonwealth and the world around us. And so much has changed. The evolution of technology, society and economics is happening at a quickening pace. And while the Crown has also evolved during this time, it continues to be an anchor for our robust and stable democracy and our diverse country.

On May 7, 2023, Simon attended the Coronation Concert at Windsor Castle.

==== Departure ====
Simon departed from Rideau Hall on June 8, 2026. She was succeeded by jurist Louise Arbour. Before her departure, the federal government announced $5 million in funding for a mental health initiative in northern and rural communities, which is named after Simon and led by the Rideau Hall Foundation.

=== Criticism ===
Due to a growing number of abusive comments, in February 2023 the office of the Governor General closed commenting on social media posts.

==== Expenses ====
In June 2022, Simon came under fire after a National Post story was published regarding exorbitant in-flight catering costs of over $93,000 for her eight-day trip to the Middle East. She called the criticism "unfair" as she had no part in the logistics of her trips to discuss world peace but her office would try to "minimize the cost of future voyages".

==== French ====
In 2015, Simon said she was "deeply committed" to learning French. After her appointment in July 2021, Simon again committed to learn French during her tenure as governor general, though, in September 2024, there were concerns about her inability to speak the language, with The Montreal Gazette reporting Simon was "unable to hold a conversation in French beyond a simple hello" during a visit to the Quebec City region. The Gazette reported "The affair caused a stir in Ottawa", and a planned visit to Pignon Bleu the following day was cancelled. Bloc Québécois Leader Yves-François Blanchet argued Simon "should not have been appointed without being able to speak French."

In April 2026, approaching the end of the customary five-year term for governors general, Prime Minister Mark Carney said that Canada's next governor general would speak French, eventually nominating Louise Arbour, a francophone Québecoise, as Simon's successor.

==== Impartiality ====
In a June 2025 legal commentary by Murray Simser, Simon was criticized for remarks made in a television interview in which she addressed issues including Indigenous affairs, residential schools, and corporate assets, with Simser arguing this constituted a departure from the office's non-partisan function and role. Simser contended that such statements risk undermining the perceived and necessary constitutional impartiality of the Governor General and raised questions about her fitness for the role.

== Personal life ==
Simon is the second-oldest of eight children. Her brother, Johnny May, is a locally renowned bush pilot. In her youth, Simon attended an Anglican church with her family. At age 40, she developed depression and burnout, but gradually overcame them.

Simon married her first husband, Robert Otis, on March 27, 1967, in Kuujjuaq. She later married George Simon, and in 1994 she married her current husband, journalist and author Whit Fraser, a former head of the Canadian Polar Commission. She has two sons and one daughter. Simon speaks English and Inuktitut.

== Honours ==
Viceregal styles of Mary Simon (2021–2026)
- Reference style: Her Excellency the Right Honourable; Son Excellence la très honorable
- Spoken style: Your Excellency; Votre Excellence

Ribbon bars of Mary Simon

Appointments and awards
Honour	Date	Citation
	Order of Canada	Extraordinary Companion of the Order in 2021; Officer of the Order in 2005; Member of the Order in 1992
	Order of Military Merit	Extraordinary Commander of the Order in 2021
	Order of Merit of the Police Forces	Commander of the Order in 2021
	The Most Venerable Order of the Hospital of St. John of Jerusalem	Dame of Justice and Prior of the Order in 2021
	National Order of Quebec	Officer of the Order in 1992
	Governor General's Northern Medal (Polar Medal)	August 4, 2011
	125th Anniversary of the Confederation of Canada Medal	1992
	Queen Elizabeth II Golden Jubilee Medal (Canadian Version)	February 6, 2002
	Queen Elizabeth II Diamond Jubilee Medal (Canadian Version)	February 6, 2012
	King Charles III Coronation Medal (Canadian Version)	2024
	Canadian Forces' Decoration	July 22, 2021
	Queen Elizabeth II Platinum Jubilee Medal (Alberta Version)	2022
	Greenland Medal for Meritorious Service (Gold)	July 24, 1992
	National Aboriginal Achievement Award	1996
	Gold Medal of the Royal Canadian Geographical Society	1998
	Symons Medal of the Confederation Centre of the Arts	November 3, 2009

=== Honorary degrees ===
University	Degree	Date	Ref.
McGill University	Doctor of Laws	June 5, 1992	
Queen's University	Doctor of Laws	October 28, 1994	
Trent University	Doctor of Laws	June 2, 2005	
Memorial University	Doctor of Laws	May 2008	
University of Guelph	Doctor of Laws	February 2009	
Carleton University	Doctor of Laws	June 7, 2011	
University of Alberta	Doctor of Laws	June 12, 2012	
Mount Saint Vincent University	Doctor of Humane Letters	2013	
University of British Columbia	Doctor of Laws	May 26, 2016	
University of Victoria	Doctor of Laws	June 2016	
University of Calgary	Doctor of Laws	June 7, 2017	
University of Western Ontario	Doctor of Laws	June 19, 2017	
University of Manitoba	Doctor of Laws	June 20, 2023	
Royal Military College	Doctor of Laws	May 16, 2024	

=== Honorary academic positions ===
- Mary May Simon was the Chancellor of Trent University (1995–1999, 2002).

== Honorary military appointments ==
Military command	Date	Regiment	Position
(Canada) Canadian Army	July 26, 2021 – June 8, 2026	The Governor General's Horse Guards	Colonel of the Regiment
(Canada) Canadian Army	July 26, 2021 – June 8, 2026	Governor General's Foot Guards	Colonel of the Regiment
(Canada) Canadian Army	July 26, 2021 – June 8, 2026	The Canadian Grenadier Guards	Colonel of the Regiment

== Current positions and memberships ==
Simon is a fellow of the Arctic Institute of North America and of the Royal Canadian Geographical Society.

She holds other positions, including the following:

- Advisor to the European Space Agency (Arctic Monitoring Program)
- Chairperson, Arctic Children and Youth Foundation
- Board Member, Indspire
- Member of the Board of Governors, University of the Arctic
- Council Member, Crossing Boundaries National Council
- Member of Advisory Circle, Walter and Duncan Gordon Charitable Foundation
- Council Member, The National Police Services Advisory Council

== Arms ==
Coat of arms of Mary Simon
Notes Simon was granted armorial bearings by the Canadian Heraldic Authority following her appointment as governor general. The elements of the achievement were chosen to reflect Simon's upbringing and career. The shape of the escutcheon resembles an amauti, a traditional parka worn by Inuit women. Adopted August 15, 2022 Crest A snowy owl affronty wings displayed and inverted environed by caribou antlers proper Escutcheon Argent an annulet, overall a fess nowy Azure charged with the Royal Crown Argent Supporters Two Arctic foxes proper each gorged of a collar Azure pendent therefrom a hurt that to the dexter charged with a mountain sorrel flower, that to the sinister with a cinquefoil Argent, each fox supporting a kakivak and standing on a rocky mount set with a blueberry patch and cottongrass flowers proper Motto: ᐊᔪᐃᓐᓇᑕ; Ajuinnata; (Inuktitut for 'Persevere') Orders: Circlet, ribbon and badge of the Order of Canada; Ribbon and badge of the Order of Military Merit; Ribbon and insignia of the Order of Merit of the Police Forces

== Published works ==
Simon is the author of many works regarding the environment, education, language, and Inuit culture:

Books

- Simon, Mary May (1996). Inuit: One Future – One Arctic. Peterborough, Ontario: Cider Press. ISBN 1-896851-12-6.

Book contributions

- Simon, Mary (1989). "Security, Peace and the Native Peoples of the Arctic". The Arctic: Choices for Peace and Security. West Vancouver, British Columbia: Gordon Soules Book Publishers. pp. 31–36. ISBN 0-919574-82-3.
- Simon, Mary (1992). "Militarization and the Aboriginal Peoples". In Griffiths, Franklyn (ed.). Arctic Alternatives: Civility or Militarism in the Circumpolar North. Toronto, Ontario: Science for Peace. pp. 55–67. ISBN 0-88866-951-8. Archived from the original on April 7, 2023.
- May Simon, Mary (1999). "The Arctic and the Antarctic: Heritage of Humanity". In Lewkowicz, Antoni G. (ed.). Poles Apart: A Study in Contrasts. Ottawa, Ontario: University of Ottawa Press. pp. 3–8. ISBN 0-7766-0497-X. Archived from the original on April 4, 2023.
- Simon, Mary (2009). "Climate Change, Sovereignty and Partnership with the Inuit". In Abele, Frances; Courchene, Thomas J.; Seidle, F. Leslie; St-Hilaire, France (eds.). Northern Exposure: Peoples, Powers and Prospects in Canada's North. Montreal, Quebec: Institute for Research on Public Policy. pp. 523–528. ISBN 978-0-88645-205-6.

Reports

- Simon, Mary (2017). A New Shared Arctic Leadership Model (PDF). Gatineau, Quebec: Indigenous and Northern Affairs Canada. ISBN 978-0-660-09492-2. JSTOR community.27989915. Archived (PDF) from the original on July 23, 2021.

Articles

- Simon, Mary (1985). "The Role of Inuit in International Affairs". Études Inuit Studies. 9 (2): 33–38. JSTOR 42869520.
- Simon, Mary (July 6, 1987). "Striking Paranoma in a North of Harmony and Bitterness". Ottawa Citizen. p. A9. ProQuest 239048291.
- Simon, Mary (1989). "Toward an Arctic Zone of Peace: An Inuit Perspective". Peace Research. 21 (4): 27–30, 71. JSTOR 23609829.
- Simon, Mary (1991). "IUCN and Indigenous Peoples: A New Partnership". Canadian Biodiversity. 1 (3): 2–4. ProQuest 1012155001.
- Simon, Mary (1992). "Environment, Sustainable Development and Self-Government". Études Inuit Studies. 16 (1–2): 33–38. JSTOR 42869727.
- Simon, Mary (1997). "Building Partnerships: Perspectives from the Arctic". Behind the Headlines. Vol. 54, no. 3. pp. 10–15. Gale A30334794 ProQuest 204577796.
- Simon, Mary (1998). "Children and Youth of the Arctic: A Critical Challenge of Sustainable Development". Northern Review (18): 70–78. Gale A30484038.
- Simon, Mary (2000). "From Kangiqsualujjuaq to Copenhagen: A Personal Journey". Northern Review (22): 17–21. Gale A30007927. Archived from the original on July 23, 2021.
- Simon, Mary (2000). "Canada's Renewed Commitment to Northern Issues Through Policy Development and Partnership-Building". Northern Review (22): 115–119. Gale A30008294.
- Simon, Mary (2002). "The Arctic Council: Tackling Sustainable Development in the Circumpolar Region". Biodiversity. 3 (3): 13. Bibcode:2002Biodi...3c..13S. doi:10.1080/14888386.2002.9712589. S2CID 128822118.
- May Simon, Mary (June 2004). "Minority Government and Climate Change Action" (PDF). International Institute for Sustainable Development. Archived (PDF) from the original on July 29, 2021.
- Simon, Mary (October 1, 2006). "Our Children and Youth" (PDF). Inuktituk. No. 101. pp. 50–53. Archived (PDF) from the original on July 25, 2021.
- Simon, Mary; Smith, Duane (November 6, 2006). "Inuit, climate change and northern development". The Hill Times. Archived from the original on July 23, 2021.
- Simon, Mary (January 1, 2007). "Planting Dreams" (PDF). Inuktituk. No. 102. pp. 52–55. Archived (PDF) from the original on September 9, 2022.
- Simon, Mary (February 16, 2007). "Planting Dreams Where We Are Told All Hope Is Gone ..." Nunatsiaq News. Archived from the original on July 23, 2021.
- Simon, Mary (April 10, 2007). "Canada's Inuit Stand By East Coast Sealers". The Globe and Mail. Archived from the original on July 23, 2021.
- Simon, Mary (April 16, 2007). "Polar Bear as Poster Animal". National Post. p. A14. ProQuest 330634800.
- Simon, Mary (July 1, 2007). "The Eyes of the World Are on the Arctic" (PDF). Inuktituk. No. 103. pp. 62–65. Archived (PDF) from the original on July 25, 2021.
- Simon, Mary (July 1, 2007). "Stepping Forward" (PDF). Windspeaker. p. 5. Archived (PDF) from the original on July 25, 2021.
- Simon, Mary (July 26, 2007). "Inuit: The Bedrock of Arctic Sovereignty". The Globe and Mail. Archived from the original on July 23, 2021.
- Simon, Mary (August 27, 2007). "Overcrowded Housing in Nunavut Has Created One of the Highest Rates of Hospital Admissions in the World". The Hill Times. Archived from the original on July 23, 2021.
- Simon, Mary (November 12, 2007). "Sovereignty from the North". The Walrus. Archived from the original on July 23, 2021.
- Simon, Mary (November 28, 2007). ""Inuit Have Our Pens Out"". The Globe and Mail. p. A22. Gale A171847601 ProQuest 383395061.
- Simon, Mary (January 1, 2008). "Delivering an Inuit Message to Canadians" (PDF). Inuktituk. No. 104. pp. 68–69. Archived (PDF) from the original on July 23, 2021.
- Simon, Mary (March 26, 2008). "In the Arctic, You Can't Go Back to the Future". The Globe and Mail. Archived from the original on July 23, 2021.
- Simon, Mary (May 17, 2008). "Polar Bear Politics Hurt Inuit". The Globe and Mail. Archived from the original on July 23, 2021.
- Simon, Mary (October 1, 2008). "The Zen of Blueberry Picking!" (PDF). Inuktituk. No. 105. pp. 64–67. Archived (PDF) from the original on July 23, 2021.
- Simon, Mary (October 14, 2008). "Maybe This Parliament Will Get it Right; Let's See Our Freshly Elected Members Finally Take Action on Aboriginal Issues That Will Make a Difference for Native Peoples". Ottawa Citizen. p. A15. ProQuest 241206921.
- Simon, Mary (2009). "Inuit and the Canadian Arctic: Sovereignty Begins at Home". Journal of Canadian Studies. 43 (2): 250–260. doi:10.3138/jcs.43.2.250. S2CID 142761049. ProQuest 203561682.
- Simon, Mary (January 1, 2009). "Will The Winds of Change Blow North?" (PDF). Inuktituk. No. 106. pp. 60–63.
- Simon, Mary (February 13, 2009). "Assimilation Is No Solution". National Post. p. A17. ProQuest 330851699.
- Simon, Mary (March 11, 2009). "Inuit on Sealing: We Want Your Mind, Not Your Money". The Globe and Mail. Archived from the original on July 23, 2021.
- Simon, Mary (March 18, 2009). "EU's Inuit Seal Ban Exemption About Salving Consciences". Embassy. Archived from the original on April 2, 2009.
- Simon, Mary (May 13, 2009). "EU Arctic Bid Off to Poor Start". Embassy. Archived from the original on July 23, 2021.
- Simon, Mary (July 2, 2009). "Inuit Need Representation in the Senate". Nunatsiaq News. Archived from the original on July 23, 2021.
- Simon, Mary (July 3, 2009). "Equal Health Care for All Canadian Children". The Globe and Mail. Archived from the original on July 23, 2021.
- Simon, Mary (July 10, 2009). "Canada's Shameful Inaction on Climate Change". Toronto Star. Archived from the original on June 15, 2022.
- Simon, Mary (August 20, 2009). "Northern Strategy Needs Spirit of Inuit Consensus Building". Nunatsiaq News. Archived from the original on July 23, 2021.
- Simon, Mary (October 1, 2009). "Inuit Nunangat" (PDF). Inuktituk. No. 107. pp. 48–51. Archived (PDF) from the original on July 23, 2021.
- Simon, Mary (June 1, 2010). "Olympic Spirits ..." (PDF). Inuktituk. No. 108. pp. 60–63. Archived (PDF) from the original on July 25, 2021.
- Simon, Mary (November 1, 2010). "Inuit Not Interested in Being People in the Middle of a New Cold War". The Hill Times. Archived from the original on July 23, 2021.
- Simon, Mary (December 1, 2010). "Celebrating Bill Edmunds" (PDF). Inuktituk. No. 109. pp. 56–58. Archived (PDF) from the original on July 25, 2021.
- Simon, Mary (2011). "Canadian Inuit: Where We Have Been and Where We Are Going". International Journal. 66 (4): 879–891. doi:10.1177/002070201106600415. JSTOR 23104399. S2CID 147476061. Gale A279137184.
- Simon, Mary (April 6, 2011). "For the Next Generation of Inuit, Hope Lies in Education". The Globe and Mail. Archived from the original on July 23, 2021.
- Simon, Mary (May 1, 2011). "Addressing the Education Deficit" (PDF). Inuktituk. No. 110. pp. 50–54. Archived (PDF) from the original on July 25, 2021.
- Simon, Mary (October 31, 2011). "Inuit History Is Canadian History". The Hill Times. No. 1112. p. 18.
- Simon, Mary (December 1, 2011). "The Next 40 Years" (PDF). Inuktituk. No. 111. pp. 96–103. Archived (PDF) from the original on July 25, 2021.
- Simon, Mary (May 1, 2012). "Walking Our Children to School" (PDF). Inuktituk. No. 112. pp. 60–69. Archived (PDF) from the original on July 25, 2021.
- Simon, Mary (August 1, 2012). "How Do Canada and Inuit Get to Win-Win in the Arctic?". Policy Options. Archived from the original on July 23, 2021.
- Axworthy, Lloyd; Simon, Mary (March 4, 2015). "Is Canada Undermining the Arctic Council?". The Globe and Mail. Archived from the original on July 23, 2021.
- Glithero, Lisa; Waterfall, Pauline; Simon, Mary; Watson-Wright, Wendy (January 2020). "The Heart of Our Biosphere: Exploring Our Civic Relationship with the Ocean in Canada" (PDF). IdeaLab. Canadian Commission for UNESCO. Archived (PDF) from the original on August 3, 2021.

== Notes ==
Academic offices
Preceded by Kenneth Hare	Chancellor of Trent University; 1995–1999	Succeeded by Peter Gzowski
Preceded by Peter Gzowski	Chancellor of Trent University; Acting; 2002–2003	Succeeded by Roberta Bondar
Diplomatic posts
Preceded by Brian Baker	Canadian Ambassador to Denmark; 1999–2002	Succeeded by Alfonso Gagliano
Government offices
Preceded by Julie Payette	Governor General of Canada; 2021–2026	Succeeded by Louise Arbour
Order of precedence
Preceded by Julie Payette as 29th Governor General	Order of precedence of Canada; As 30th Governor General	Succeeded by Diana Fowler LeBlanc as Widow of 25th Governor General
