= Alex Johnston (Canadian businesswoman) =

Canadian business executive

- Education: McGill University (BA, LLB, BCL)
- Occupations: Business executive; author; political staffer
- Political party: Ontario Liberal
- Children: 3
- Parents: David Johnston (father); Sharon Johnston (mother)

Barbara Alexandra Johnston is a Canadian lawyer, author, policy advisor, women's advocate, and businesswoman as well as the daughter of David Johnston, the former Governor General of Canada from 2010 to 2017.

== Early life ==
Johnston was born to David Johnston, later the 28th Governor General of Canada, and his wife, Sharon. She was her parents' second of five children, having been born after her elder sister, Deborah, and preceding her younger sisters, Sharon, Jenifer, and Catherine.

Johnston would spend her early years in Montreal, becoming bilingual in English and French. Johnston attended Montreal's Collège Jean-de-Brébeuf and holds a BA in history as well as an LLB and a BCL from McGill University.

== Career ==
Johnston practiced corporate and commercial law at Goodmans LLP before joining the office of former Ontario premier Dalton McGuinty, where she was executive director of policy between 2003 and 2011. In that role, Johnston worked alongside Gerald Butts, McGuinty's principal secretary. Between 2012 and 2015, Johnston ran the Canadian office of Catalyst Inc., a global non-profit advocating for the advancement of women in business. In her role at Catalyst, Johnston highlighted the persistence of gender inequalities in the workplace, including gender pay gap in Canada that was double the global average. In 2016, Johnston was appointed as the Canadian Broadcasting Corporation's VP of strategy and public affairs.

In 2021, Johnston published Inconceivable: My Life-Altering Eye-Opening Journey from Infertility to Motherhood, a book documenting her experiences overcoming infertility. In the book, Johnston advocates for a more effective and inclusive approach to addressing infertility in Canada, as an increase in the average Canadian child-bearing age has led to an increase in age-related infertility.

Johnston is the CEO and a co-founder of 360 Concussion Care, a network of concussion treatment clinics. Johnston is on the board of directors of Desjardins General Insurance Group and Bishop's College School, is the co-chair of the McGill Institute for the Study of Canada, and is on the advisory board for the Women's College Hospital Institute for Health Systems Solutions and Virtual Care.

== Personal life ==
Johnston and her husband, David, are parents to three children: two daughters, Georgia and Sadie, and one son, Lucas. Johnston and her family currently live in Toronto.

== Arms ==
Coat of arms of Alex Johnston
Adopted September 24, 2010 (granted by the Canadian Heraldic Authority) Crest A candle Argent enflamed and within a stand Or flanked by four closed books their spines palewise, two Gules and two Or, all set on a closed book bound Or its edge fesswise Argent Escutcheon Argent fretty Sable, on a pale Gules the Royal Crown between two open books Or Motto Contemplare meliora (Latin for 'To envisage a better world' / 'To envisage better things')
