= Johnny May =

Canadian bush pilot (born 1945)

- Born: 1945 (age 80–81); Fort Severight, Quebec, Canada
- Occupation: Bush pilot
- Spouse: Louisa May
- Parents: Bob May (father); Nancy Angatuk (mother)
- Relatives: Mary Simon (sister)

Johnny May (born 1945) is a Canadian Inuk bush pilot living in Kuujjuaq, known as being the first Inuk pilot in eastern Canada. He is credited with saving the lives of many Inuit in search-and-rescue missions and operating medevac airplane services to transport sick Inuit to health centres. May is the older brother of Canadian Governor General, Mary Simon.

== Family ==
His father was a non-Inuit manager of the Hudson's Bay Company trading post in Fort Severight (now Kangiqsualujjuaq), while his mother was a local Inuk. Among his seven siblings, his sister Mary Simon is a former president of Makivik Corporation, former diplomat and the current Governor General of Canada.

== Career ==
May obtained his pilot's licence in 1962 after training in Pennsylvania. Through his company, Johnny May's Air Charters, he flew search-and-rescue missions in the Arctic tundra, as well as medevacs between Inuit villages and from Nunavik to hospitals in southern Canada.

He is known for his annual Christmas candy drop, which occurred annually from 1965 until 2019. On Christmas day, he would take his airplane and shower the village of Kuujjuaq with candy and gifts.

== Legacy ==
He was inducted into the Québec Air and Space Hall of Fame in 2010. A movie about his life and career entitled The Wings of Johnny May was released in 2014 in English, French and Inuktitut. A children's book about his annual candy drop titled The Kuujjuaq Christmas Candy Drop by Linda Brand was released in 2015. In 2017 a short animated film was produced by the CBC called The Great Northern Candy Drop. In 2023, a children's picture book, The Little Nunavik Airplane / Painngupaali arvitartuq / Le p’tit avion du Nunavik was published in Quebec. The book tells the story of Pengo Pally, Johnny May's little beaver aircraft, which takes readers on a tour from Kangiqsualujjuaq to Kuujjuaraapik, and welcomes the animals of the region on board. Through a small airplane's perspective, the story reveals the region's unique beauty and cultural richness. Inspired by Johnny May, the first Inuk pilot in Canada, the book celebrates his "Christmas Candy Drop" tradition and contributions to Nunavik. The book was created with inuit collaborators and translated in Inuktitut.
