= Sharon Johnston =

55th viceregal consort of Canada

Sharon Johnston CC

55th Viceregal consort of Canada
- In role October 1, 2010 – October 2, 2017
- Governor General: David Johnston
- Preceded by: Jean-Daniel Lafond
- Succeeded by: Whit Fraser (2021)

Personal details
- Born: Sharon Downey; 1943 (age 82–83) Sault Ste. Marie, Ontario, Canada
- Spouse: David Johnston (m. 1964)
- Children: 5 (including Alex)
- Education: University of Toronto; University of Western Ontario (BSc); McGill University (MSc, PhD)
- Occupation: Rehabilitation therapist; author

Sharon Johnston CC (born 1943) is a Canadian author who was the 55th viceregal consort of Canada, due to being the wife of David Johnston, the 28th Governor General of Canada.

== Life and career ==
A native of Sault Ste. Marie, she completed her studies in physiotherapy and occupational therapy at the University of Toronto and received a BSc degree at the University of Western Ontario and an MSc degree at McGill University. She also graduated as a Doctor of Philosophy in rehabilitation science at McGill.

The Johnstons married in 1964 and were high school sweethearts.

She began her medical career working for the Crippled Children's Centre in Toronto, now known as the Holland Bloorview Kids Rehabilitation Hospital.

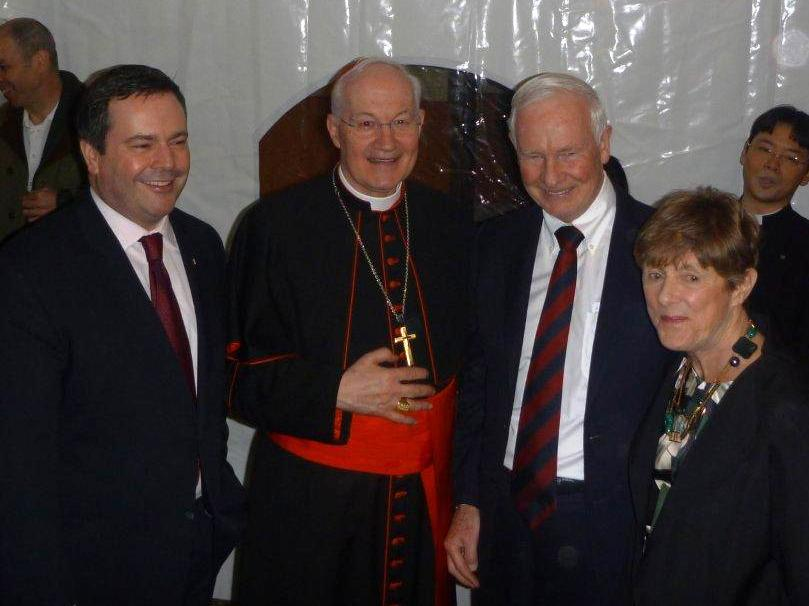
Sharon Johnston (far right) and her husband with Cardinal Marc Ouellet and Jason Kenney the evening preceding the papal inauguration of Pope Francis

At the time of her husband's appointment as Governor General, she was taking a creative writing course at Humber College and writing a historical fiction novel. The novel, the first volume of a planned trilogy, was published by Dundurn Press as Matrons and Madams in April 2015.

She operates a horse training centre, Chatterbox Farm outside of Waterloo, Ontario, which she owns with her husband. They have five daughters together, including Alex Johnston.

== Honours ==
- As the viceregal consort of Canada, she was styled Her Excellency while in office. She was invested ex officio as a Companion of the Order of Canada (CC) by Queen Elizabeth II on September 5, 2010, during an audience with Her Majesty at Balmoral Castle. She was also appointed as a Dame of Justice of the Most Venerable Order of the Hospital of Saint John of Jerusalem (DStJ) at the same time.
- When she and her husband left office on October 2, 2017, their Order of Canada appointments were transferred to appointments as Extraordinary Companions.
- In 2012, she was awarded the Canadian version of the Queen Elizabeth II Diamond Jubilee Medal.
- On April 18, 2018, she was given the Key to the City of Ottawa by Mayor of Ottawa Jim Watson.
- On July 29, 2018, she was named an Alpha Gamma Delta Distinguished Citizen, one of their highest alumnae honours.

Ribbon bars of Sharon Johnston

Ribbon	Description	Notes
	Order of Canada (CC)	Companion (September 5, 2010); Extraordinary Companion (October 2, 2017)
	Order of St. John (DStJ)	Dame of Justice (September 5, 2010)
	Queen Elizabeth II Diamond Jubilee Medal	Canadian version (February 6, 2012)

=== Honorary military appointments ===
- (Canada) June 6, 2016 – present: Honorary Captain of the Royal Canadian Navy, with responsibility for Military Personnel Command of the Canadian Armed Forces.

=== Honorary educational appointments ===
Sharon Johnston has been nominated to many voluntary educational roles, such as the board of Collège international Marie de France in Montreal, and Bishop's College School in Lennoxville, Quebec.

=== Honorary degrees ===
Location	Date	School	Degree
British Columbia	2015	Vancouver Island University	Doctor of Laws (LLD)
Ontario	June 7, 2016	Carleton University	Doctor of Laws (LLD)
Manitoba	May 18, 2017	University of Manitoba	Doctor of Laws (LLD)
Ontario	June 21, 2017	University of Western Ontario	Doctor of Laws (LLD)
Ontario	2018	Nipissing University	Doctor of Education (DEd)
New Brunswick	2019	Mount Allison University	Doctor of Laws (LLD)
Ontario	June 23, 2021	University of Ontario Institute of Technology	Doctor of Laws (LLD)

== See also ==
- Viceregal consort of Canada

Honorary titles
Preceded by Jean-Daniel Lafond	Viceregal Consort of Canada; 2010–2017	Succeeded by Whit Fraser
