= Whit Fraser =

Viceregal consort of Canada since 2021

Whit Fraser CC
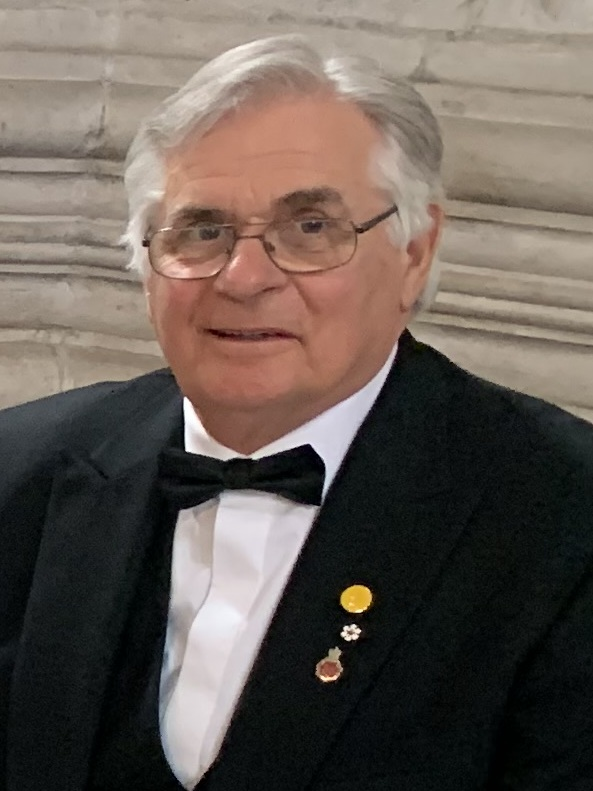
- Fraser in 2022

Viceregal consort of Canada
- In role July 26, 2021 – June 8, 2026
- Governor General: Mary Simon
- Preceded by: Sharon Johnston (2017)
- Succeeded by: Vacant

Chair of the Canadian Polar Commission
- In office 1991–1999

Personal details
- Born: Whit Grant Fraser; November 26, 1942 (age 83) Merigomish, Nova Scotia, Canada
- Spouse: Mary Simon (m. 1994)
- Children: 3
- Occupation: Journalist; author

Whit Grant Fraser CC (born November 26, 1942) is a Canadian journalist, broadcaster, and author who has served as the 56th viceregal consort of Canada from 2021 to 2026, as the husband of Governor General Mary Simon.

== Biography ==
Born in Merigomish, Nova Scotia, and educated in Stellarton, Fraser began his career in journalism as a reporter for CKEC-FM in New Glasgow.

He joined CBC News in 1967 as a reporter in Frobisher Bay and later in Yellowknife. He covered topics such as land claims and oil and gas development in northern Canada. His coverage of the Mackenzie Valley Pipeline Inquiry in the late 1970s expanded his national prominence, following which he worked for a number of years as a national reporter based in Ottawa and Edmonton. In 1989 he was one of the final contenders to replace Peter Downie as host of the network's noon-hour newscast Midday, but was not selected; instead, he became host of This Country, a six-hour nightly program on the CBC's new all-news channel CBC Newsworld which covered regional news from across the country.

He left the CBC in 1991 when he was appointed by the federal government as chair of the Canadian Polar Commission, a new federal government agency devoted to territorial and Arctic issues. He briefly returned to television with the Inuit Broadcasting Corporation in 1999 as cohost with Jonah Kelly of the special broadcast covering the formal creation of Nunavut. He subsequently served as chief operating officer of Inuit Tapiriit Kanatami in the 2000s.

In 2018, he published True North Rising, a memoir of his work in Arctic communities.

In 2021, he was appointed an ex-officio Extraordinary Companion of the Order of Canada by Queen Elizabeth II – a customary appointment for all modern viceregal consorts – and gained the temporary courtesy style of Excellency upon his wife's assumption of office as governor general.

In 2022, he published his second book, Cold Edge of Heaven, a historical fiction novel set in Dundas Harbour and based on some actual events.

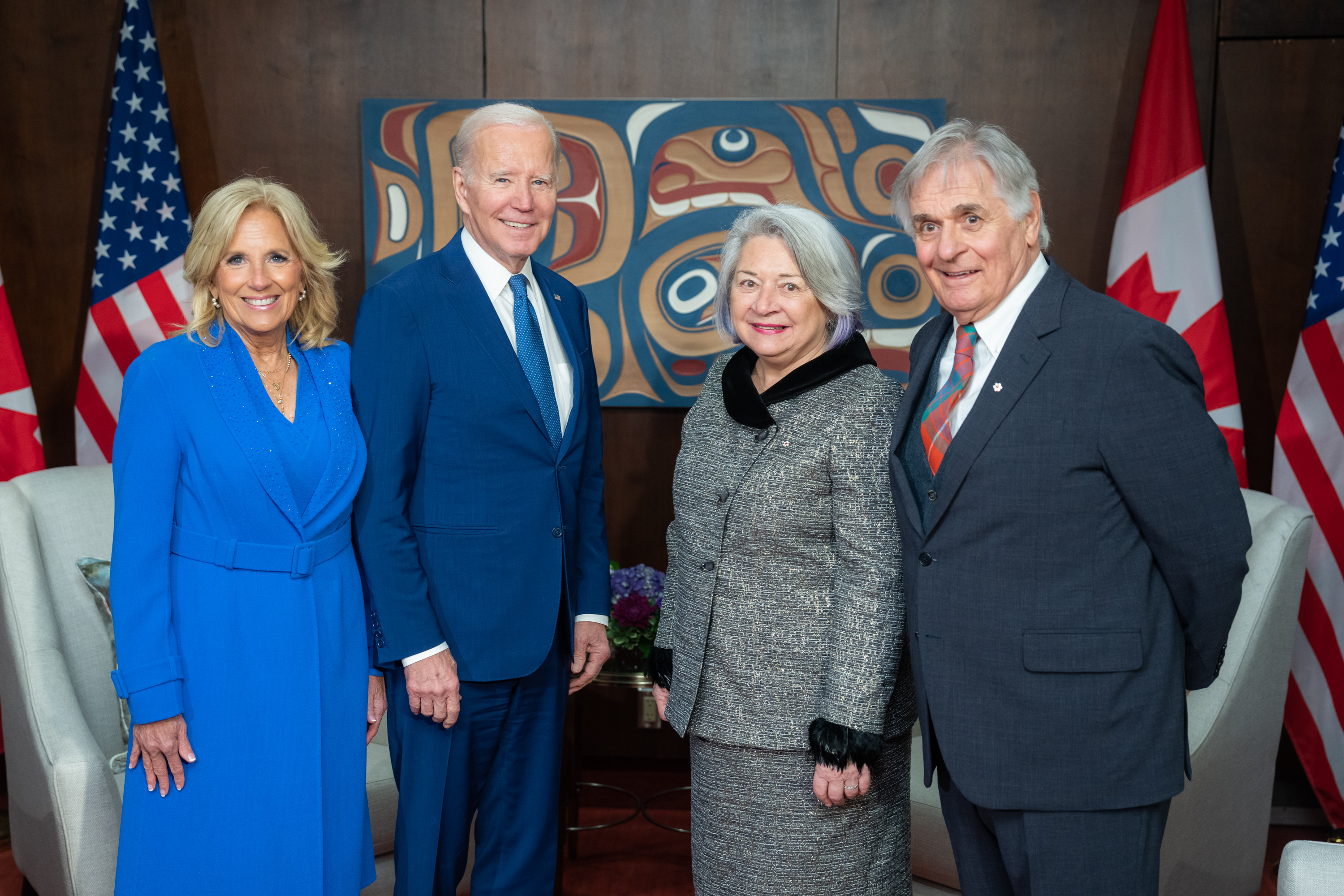
Fraser with his wife Mary Simon and US President Joe Biden and First Lady Jill Biden in Ottawa, 2023

Honorary titles
| Preceded by Sharon Johnston (2017) | Viceregal Consort of Canada; 2021–2026 | Succeeded by Vacant |
