= Inauguration of Pope Francis =

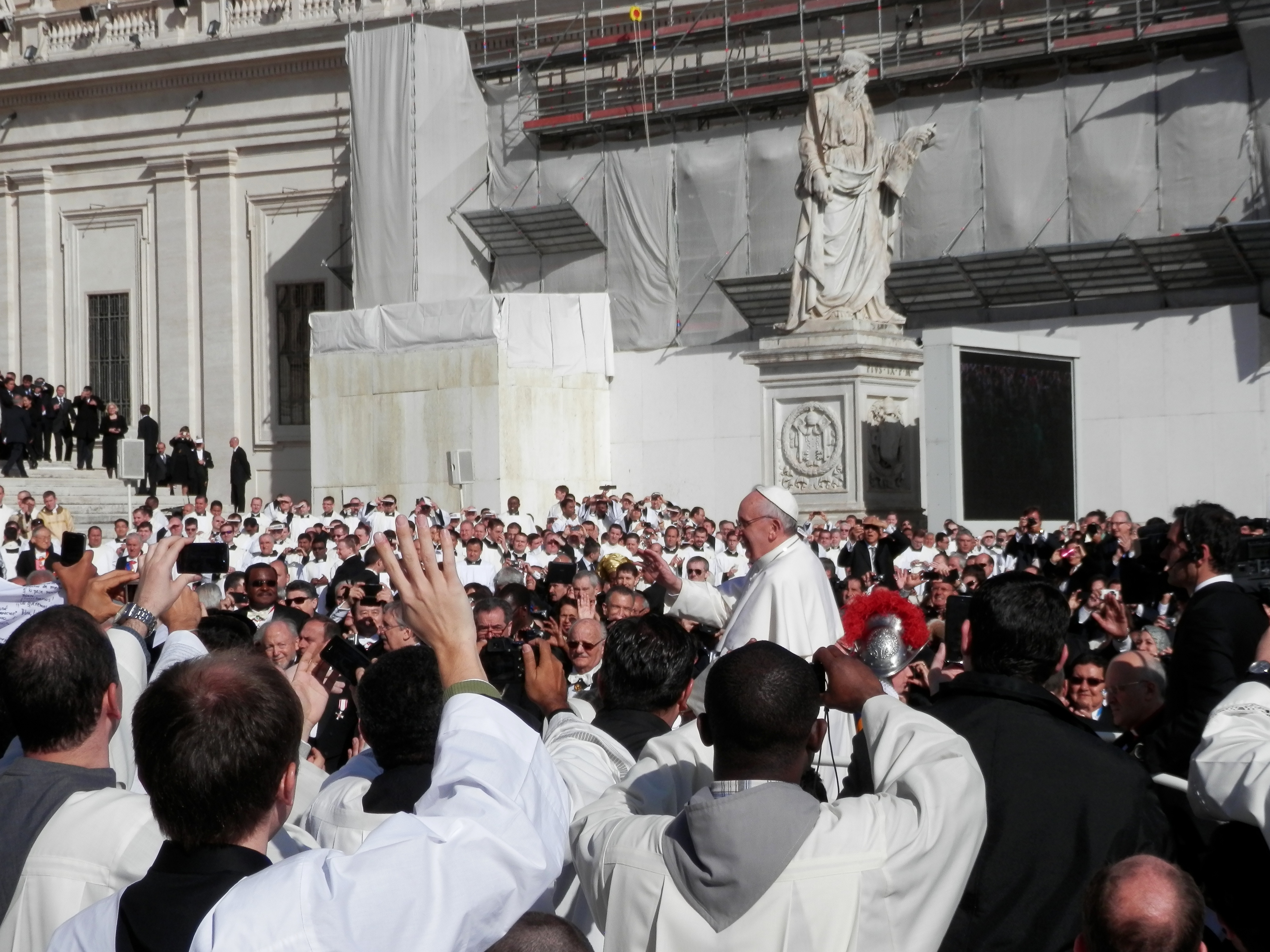
- Pope Francis among the people at St. Peter's Square during the inauguration Mass
- Date: 19 March 2013
- Venue: St. Peter's Square
- Location: Vatican City
- Type: Papal inauguration
- Participants: 150,000–200,000

Pope Francis was inaugurated on 19 March 2013 in St. Peter's Square in the Vatican. Holy Mass was celebrated before political and religious leaders from around the world. The crowd was estimated between 150,000 and 200,000. Official delegations from 132 states and various religious groups attended. It was the first papal inauguration attended by the Patriarch of Constantinople in over 1,000 years.

== Ceremony ==
About half an hour before the Mass, Francis toured the square in the popemobile to greet the crowds. He stopped and left the popemobile once to kiss a disabled man. Pope Francis wore a simple mitre, which he had had since he was bishop, as well as its matching chasuble. He used the Papal ferula that Pope Benedict XVI used, but in contrast to Benedict XVI's grand liturgical sense, Pope Francis kept the songs and liturgical actions simple.

After the pope's arrival, the ceremony began with the new pope descending to the tomb of St. Peter in St. Peter's Basilica. The pope, along with the patriarchs and major-archbishops of the Eastern Catholic Churches prayed at the tomb. Afterwards, the pallium—a lamb's wool shawl—and the Ring of the Fisherman were taken by two deacons from the tomb where they had previously been laid and carried up to be borne in procession. Then the pope and the Eastern Catholic patriarchs and major-archbishops went up to the basilica main floor and proceeded along with the other cardinals, bishops and other clergy in procession to the square chanting the "Laudes Regiæ".

The cardinal protodeacon, Cardinal Jean-Louis Tauran, bestowed the pallium on the pope. The senior cardinal-priest present, Godfried Danneels, read the prayer for the new pope before the Ring of the Fisherman was presented. (Note: The cardinal protopresbyter or protopriest reads the prayer for the new pope, Cardinal Paulo Evaristo Arns did not travel from Brazil to attend so the next senior cardinal-priest Godfried Danneels, read it.) Angelo Sodano, Dean of the College of Cardinals, presented him with his Fisherman's Ring of gold-plated silver unlike his predecessors' which were gold. Six cardinals, two of each rank of cardinal, then professed their obedience to Pope Francis on behalf of the College of Cardinals. (Note: The six cardinals were Giovanni Battista Re and Tarcisio Bertone representing the Cardinal-Bishops; Joachim Meisner and Jozef Tomko representing the Cardinal-Priests; and Renato Raffaele Martino and Francesco Marchisano representing the Cardinal-Deacons.) In previous ceremonies, all the cardinals did so. (Note: In previous papal coronations and inaugurations up to and including Pope John Paul II's inauguration, all cardinals present professed their obedience. Pope Benedict XVI's inauguration was the first where only selected cardinals made the public profession of obedience.)

According to a Vatican spokesperson between 150,000 and 200,000 people attended.

== Homily ==
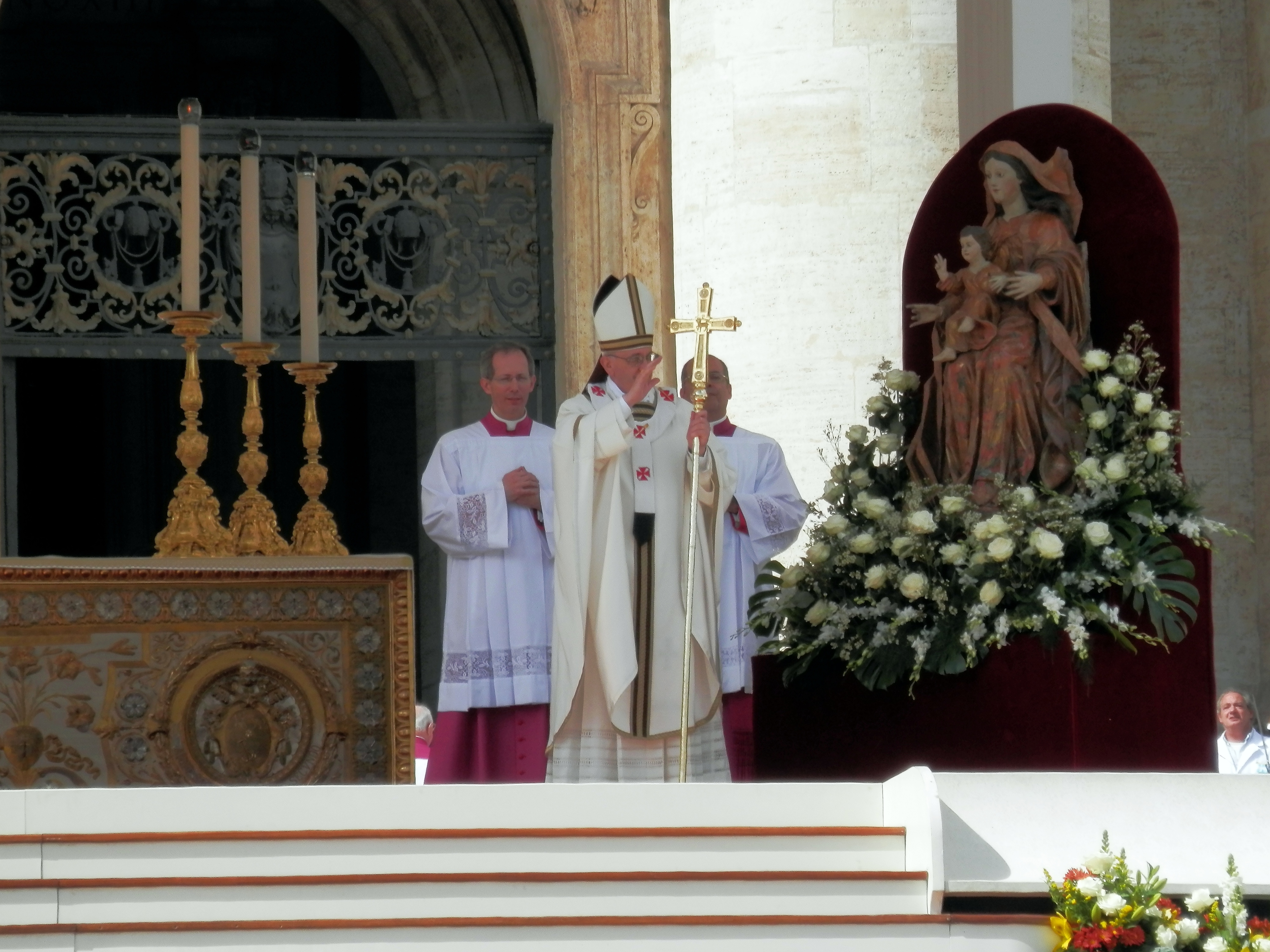
Pope Francis waving to the crowds after the Mass

Pope Francis delivered his homily in Italian. He focused on the Solemnity of Saint Joseph, the liturgical day on which the Mass was celebrated. He stated that everyone needs to care for the earth and for each other as Joseph cared for Jesus and Mary. He set forth a plan of his own actions: "The pope, too, when exercising power, must enter ever more fully into that service, which has its radiant culmination on the cross."

== Official delegations ==
Some 132 states and international organizations sent delegations to the inauguration. The delegations included 6 sovereign rulers, 31 heads of state, 3 princes, and 11 heads of government.

=== States ===
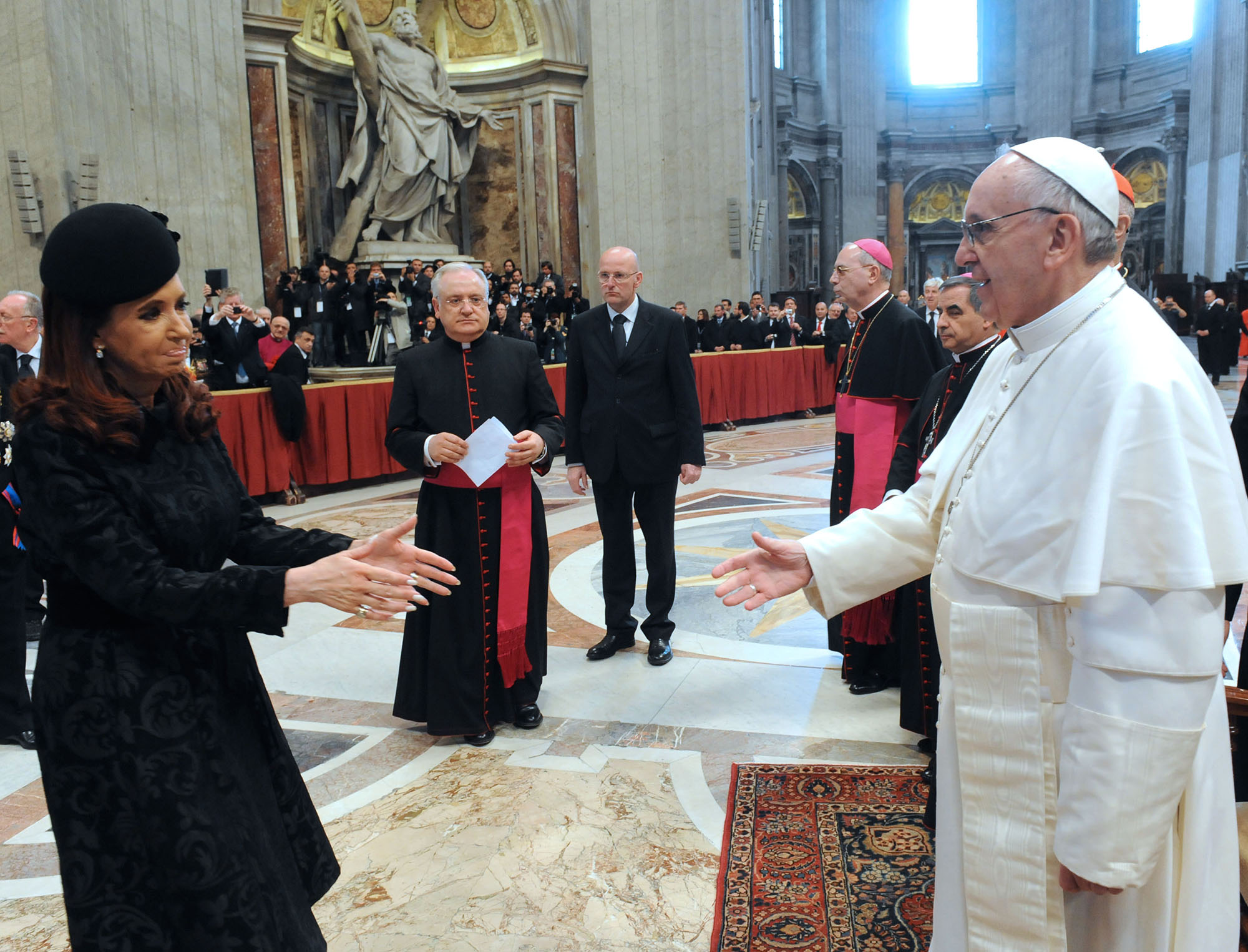
President of Argentina, Cristina Fernandez de Kirchner with Pope Francis during the installation mass.

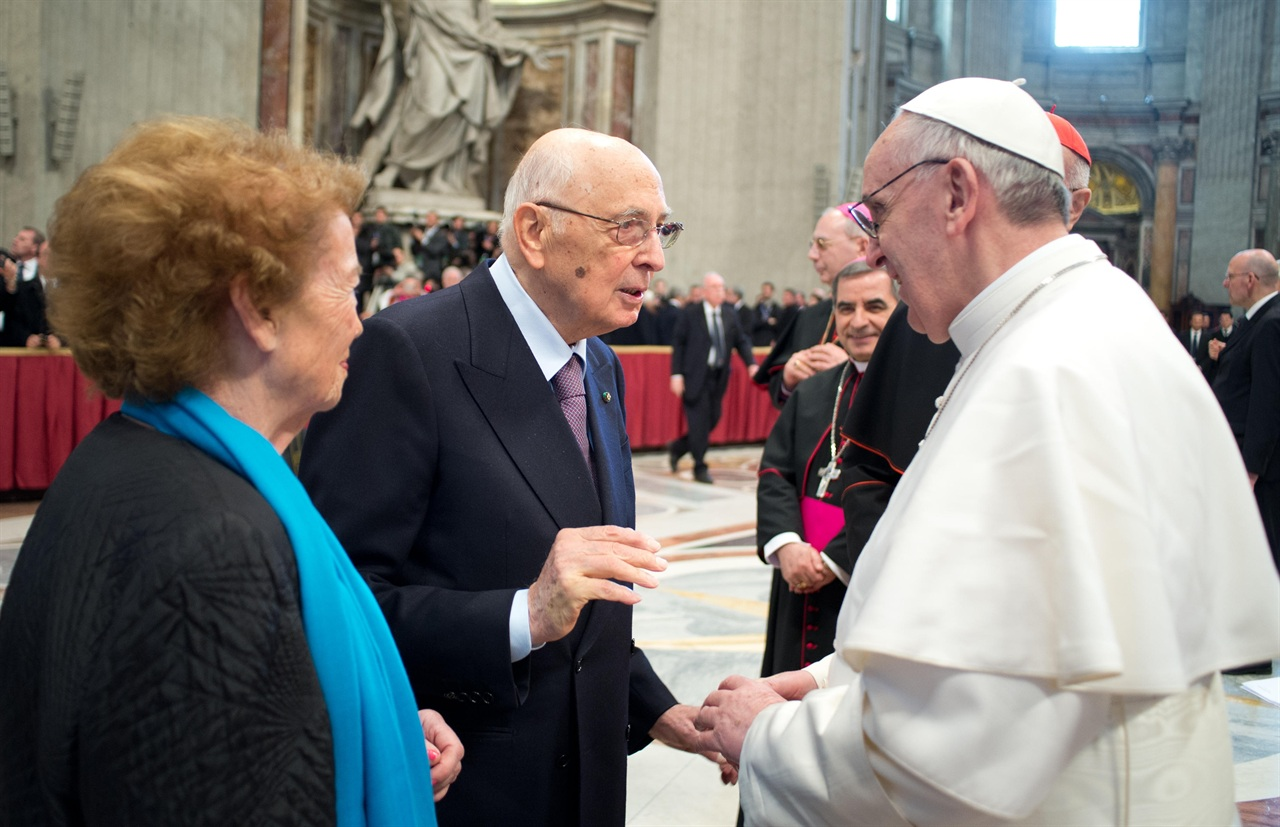
President of Italy, Giorgio Napolitano and his wife, Clio, greet Pope Francis

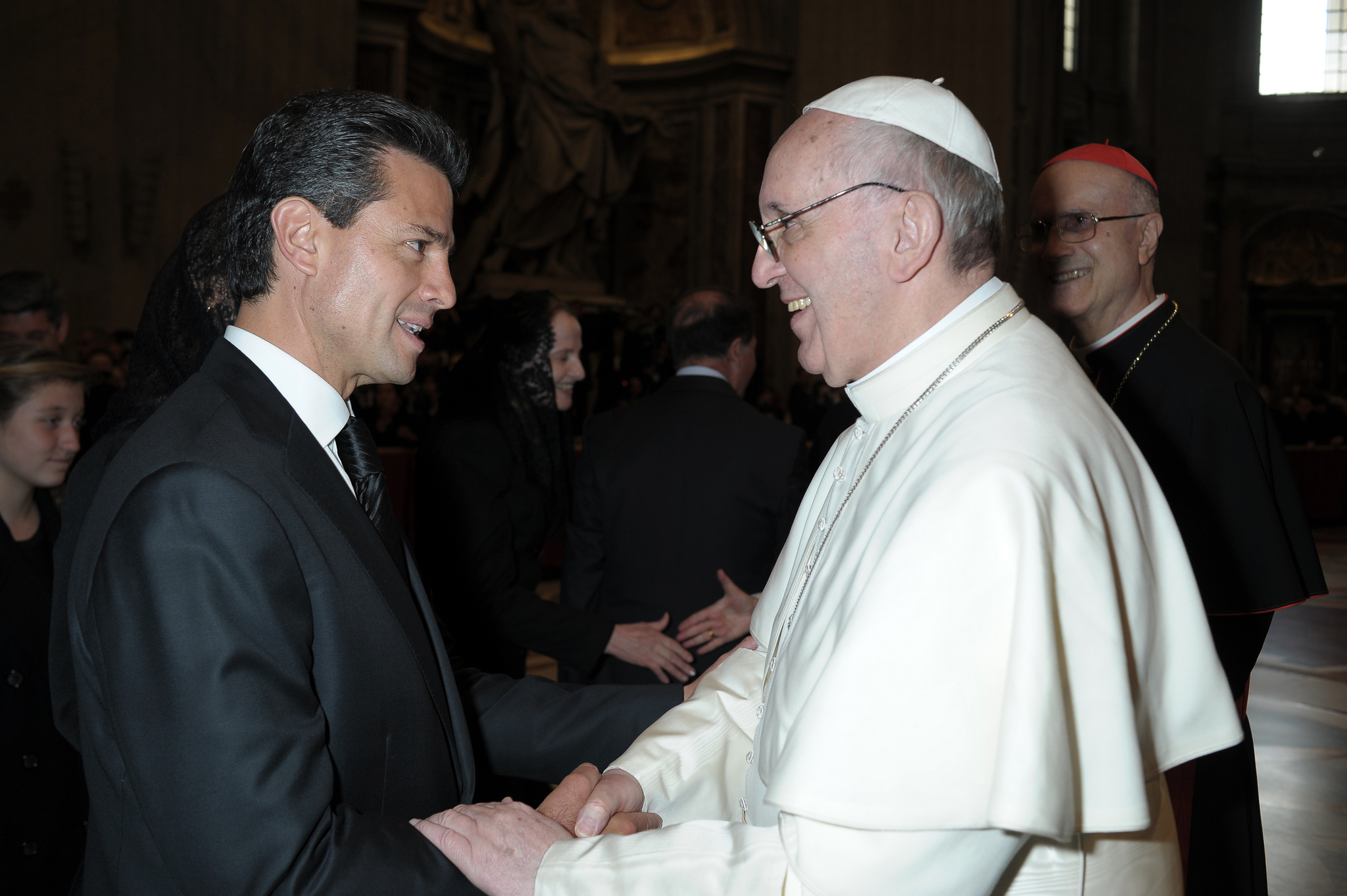
Mexican President Peña Nieto meeting Pope Francis at the papal inauguration

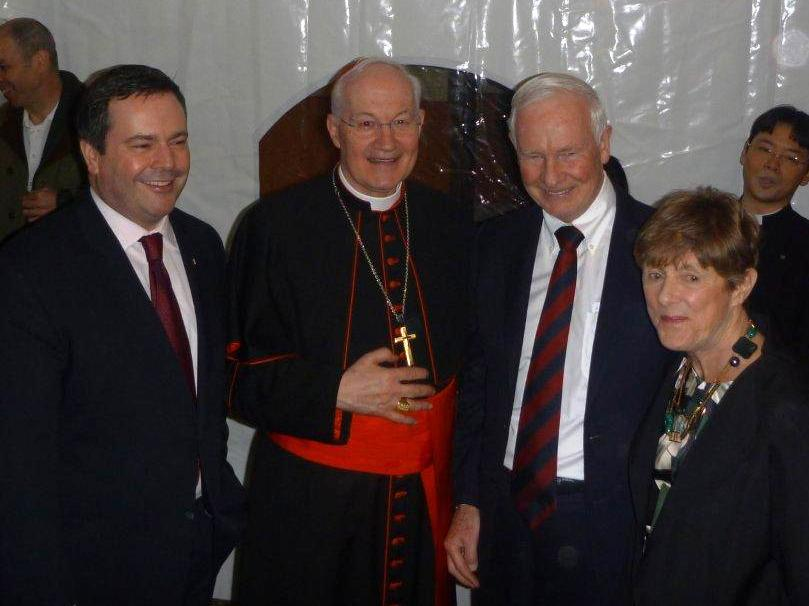
Governor General of Canada David Johnston and his wife, Sharon, with Jason Kenney, and Marc Ouellet the night before

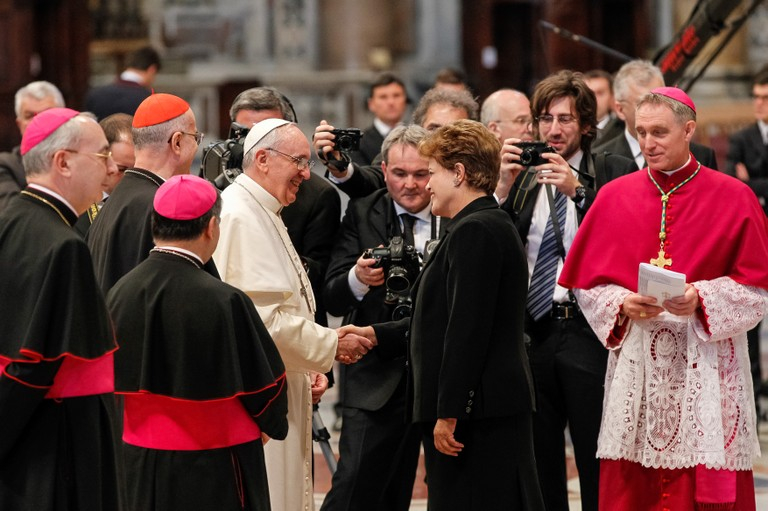
Brazilian president Dilma Rousseff greets Pope Francis

Country	Official delegation
Andorra	Co-Prince Joan Enric Vives Sicília, Bishop of Urgell
Albania	Prime Minister Sali Berisha
Angola	Vice President Manuel Domingos Vicente
Armenia	President Serzh Sargsyan
Argentina	President Cristina Fernandez de Kirchner
Austria	President Heinz Fischer and his wife, Margit Fischer; Chancellor Werner Faymann; Vice Chancellor Michael Spindelegger
Bahrain	Prince Abdullah bin Hamad bin Isa Al Khalifa
Bangladesh	Foreign Minister Dipu Moni
Belarus	Anatoly Rubinov, Chairman of the Council of the Republic; Sergey Aleinik, Ambassador to the Holy See
Belgium	King Albert II and Queen Paola; Prime Minister Elio Di Rupo
Bosnia-Herzegovina	Prime Minister Vjekoslav Bevanda; Zlatko Lagumdžija, Minister of Foreign Affairs; Sredoje Nović, Minister of Civil Affairs; Eugen Šušak, Head of the Cabinet of the Prime Minister
Brazil	President Dilma Rousseff
Bulgaria	President Rosen Plevneliev
Canada	Governor General David Johnston and his wife Sharon Johnston; Jason Kenney, Minister for Citizenship, Immigration and Multiculturalism
Chile	President Sebastian Piñera and First Lady Cecilia Morel
China, Republic of	President Ma Ying-jeou and First Lady Christine Chow Mei-ching; Vanessa Shih, Deputy Minister of Foreign Affairs
Colombia	María Ángela Holguín, Minister of Foreign Affairs
Costa Rica	President Laura Chinchilla
Croatia	President Ivo Josipović and First Lady Tatjana Josipović; Vesna Pusić, First Deputy Prime Minister and Minister of Foreign and European Affairs
Cuba	First Vice President Miguel Díaz-Canel
Cyprus	Andreas Mavroyiannis, Permanent Secretary of the Ministry of Foreign Affairs
Czech Republic	Karel Schwarzenberg, Deputy Prime Minister and Minister of Foreign Affairs
Dominican Republic	Cándida Montilla de Medina, First Lady
Ecuador	President Rafael Correa
Egypt	Mohamed Saber Ibrahim Arab, Minister of Culture
El Salvador	Hugo Martínez, Minister of Foreign Affairs
France	Prime Minister Jean-Marc Ayrault; Laurent Fabius, Minister of Foreign and European Affairs
Germany	Norbert Lammert, President of the Bundestag; Winfried Kretschmann, President of the Bundesrat; Chancellor Angela Merkel; Vice Chancellor Philipp Rösler
Honduras	President Porfirio Lobo Sosa
Hungary	President János Áder and First Lady Anita Herczegh; Zsolt Semjén, Deputy Prime Minister; György Hölvényi, State Secretary for religious, ethnic and civil society
Italy	President Giorgio Napolitano and First Lady Clio Maria Bittoni; Prime Minister Mario Monti; Pietro Grasso, President of the Senate; Laura Boldrini, President of the Chamber of Deputies
India	P. J. Kurien, Rajya Sabha Deputy Chairman
Ireland	President Michael D. Higgins and First Lady Sabina Higgins; Michael Noonan, Minister for Finance
Japan	Yoshiro Mori, former Prime Minister
Kosovo	Hashim Thaçi, Prime Minister
Lebanon	Prime Minister Nagib Miqati
Liechtenstein	Hereditary Prince Alois and his wife Hereditary Princess Sophie
Lithuania	President Dalia Grybauskaitė
Luxembourg	Grand Duke Henri and Grand Duchess Maria Teresa
Malta	President George Abela; Prime Minister Joseph Muscat; Lawrence Gonzi, Leader of the Opposition
Mexico	President Enrique Peña Nieto and First Lady Angélica Rivera
Monaco	Prince Albert II and Princess Charlene
Netherlands	Willem-Alexander and Máxima, the Prince and Princess of Orange; Prime Minister Mark Rutte
New Zealand	Chris Finlayson, Cabinet minister
Nicaragua	Vice President Omar Halleslevens
Nigeria	David Mark, President of the Senate; Stella Oduah-Ogiemwonyi, Minister of Aviation; Viola Onwuliri, Minister of State
Paraguay	President Federico Franco
Peru	Rafael Roncagliolo, Minister of Foreign Affairs
Philippines	Vice President Jejomar Binay
Poland	President Bronisław Komorowski and First Lady Anna Komorowska; Bogdan Borusewicz, Speaker of the Senate; Lech Wałęsa, former President; Jacek Cichocki, Director of the Prime Minister's Office
Portugal	President Aníbal Cavaco Silva
Romania	President Traian Băsescu
Russia	Sergey Naryshkin, Chairman of the State Duma
San Marino	Pasquale Valentini, Secretary of State for Foreign Affairs and Politics
Serbia	President Tomislav Nikolić; Ivan Mrkić, Minister of Foreign Affairs
Seychelles	Jean-Paul Adam, Minister for Foreign Affairs
Singapore	Grace Fu, Minister in Prime Minister's Office
Slovakia	President Ivan Gašparovič
Slovenia	President Borut Pahor
South Korea	Yoo Jin-ryong, Minister of Culture, Sports and Tourism
Spain	Felipe and Letizia, the Prince and Princess of Asturias; Prime Minister Mariano Rajoy
Sri Lanka	Neomal Perera, Deputy Minister of External Affairs; Sarath Kumara Gunaratna, Deputy Minister of Fisheries and Aquatic Resources; John Amaratunga, Member of Parliament
Switzerland	Didier Burkhalter Federal Councillor
Ukraine	Kostyantyn Hryshchenko, Deputy Prime Minister
United Kingdom	Prince Richard and Birgitte, the Duke and Duchess of Gloucester (representing the Queen of the United Kingdom and the Supreme Governor of the Church of England); Baroness Warsi, Senior Minister of State for Foreign and Commonwealth Affairs and Minister for Faith and Communities; Kenneth Clarke, Minister without Portfolio
United States	Vice President Joe Biden and his sister, Valerie Biden Owens; Nancy Pelosi, Minority Leader in the House of Representatives; Susana Martinez, Governor of New Mexico
Venezuela	Diosdado Cabello, President of National Assembly
Zimbabwe	President Robert Mugabe and First Lady Grace Mugabe

Taiwan's representation was opposed by China, which has asked the Vatican to end the diplomatic relations with the state.

=== Others ===
subject of international law	Official delegation
European Union	Herman Van Rompuy, President of the European Council; Jose Manuel Barroso, President of the European Commission; Martin Schulz, President of the European Parliament
United Nations	José Graziano da Silva, Director-General of the Food and Agriculture Organization (FAO)
Sovereign Military Order of Malta	Prince and Grand Master Matthew Festing

=== Religious figures ===
==== Christian churches ====
Church	Official delegation
Eastern Orthodox churches
Orthodox Church of Constantinople	Bartholomew I, Ecumenical Patriarch of Constantinople
Russian Orthodox Church	Hilarion (Alfeyev), Department for External Church Relations of Moscow Patriarchate
Serbian Orthodox Church	Metropolitan Amfilohije (Radović), Metropolitan of Montenegro and the Littoral and Administrator of Eparchy of Buenos Aires (and Central and Southern America)
Orthodox Church in America	Metropolitan Tikhon, Metropolitan of All America and Canada
Montenegrin Orthodox Church	Archbishop Mihailo, Archbishop of Cetinje and Montenegro
Anglican and Old Catholic churches
Church of England	John Sentamu, Archbishop of York, Primate of England
Episcopal Church	Pierre Whalon, bishop-in-charge of the Convocation of Episcopal Churches in Europe
Union of Utrecht (Old Catholic)	Joris Vercammen, Archbishop of Utrecht
Oriental Orthodox
Armenian Apostolic Church	Karekin II, Catholicos of All Armenians

The Ecumenical Patriarch of Constantinople had not attended a papal inauguration since the Great Schism of 1054. Orthodox leaders said that the decision of Patriarch Bartholomew I of Constantinople to attend showed that he considers the relationship between the Orthodox and Catholic churches a priority. They also noted that Francis's "well-documented work for social justice and his insistence that globalization is detrimental to the poor" may have created a "renewed opportunity" for the two church communities to "work collectively on issues of mutual concern."

==== Other religions ====
Body	Official delegation
Buddhism
Risshō Kōsei Kai	Nichiko Niwano, President
Jainism
Institute of Jainology	Harshadray N Sanghrajka, Deputy Chair & Director
Judaism
Italian Jewish Community	Riccardo di Segni, Grand Rabbi of Rome; Riccardo Pacifici, President of Rome's Jewish community
Chief Rabbinate of Israel	Oded Wiener, Director General
Islam
Islamic Community of Serbia	Muhamed Jusufspahić, Mufti of Serbia and Vice President of Rijaset of Islamic Community of Serbia
Islamic Community of Latin America	Mohamed Youssef Hajar, Secretary General of the Islamic Organisation of Latin America
