= Rideau Hall Foundation =

Canadian charity

The Rideau Hall Foundation is a Canadian charity founded and chaired by David Johnston, who served as Governor General of Canada from 2010 until 2017. The charity's objective is to promote equality of educational opportunity, invest in Canadian innovators and foster more volunteerism.

The Government of Canada has donated $3 million, and up to $7 million in matching funds over 10 years, to the foundation as a legacy gift honouring Johnston's tenure as governor general. The foundation's goal "is to gather, align and mobilize ideas, people and resources to move the Canadian spirit and our shared aspirations forward".

The foundation held a fundraising campaign for the restoration of 24 Sussex Drive.
