= David Johnston (governor general) =

Governor General of Canada from 2010 to 2017

The Right Honourable David Johnston PC CC CMM COM CD FRSC(hon) FRCPSC(hon)
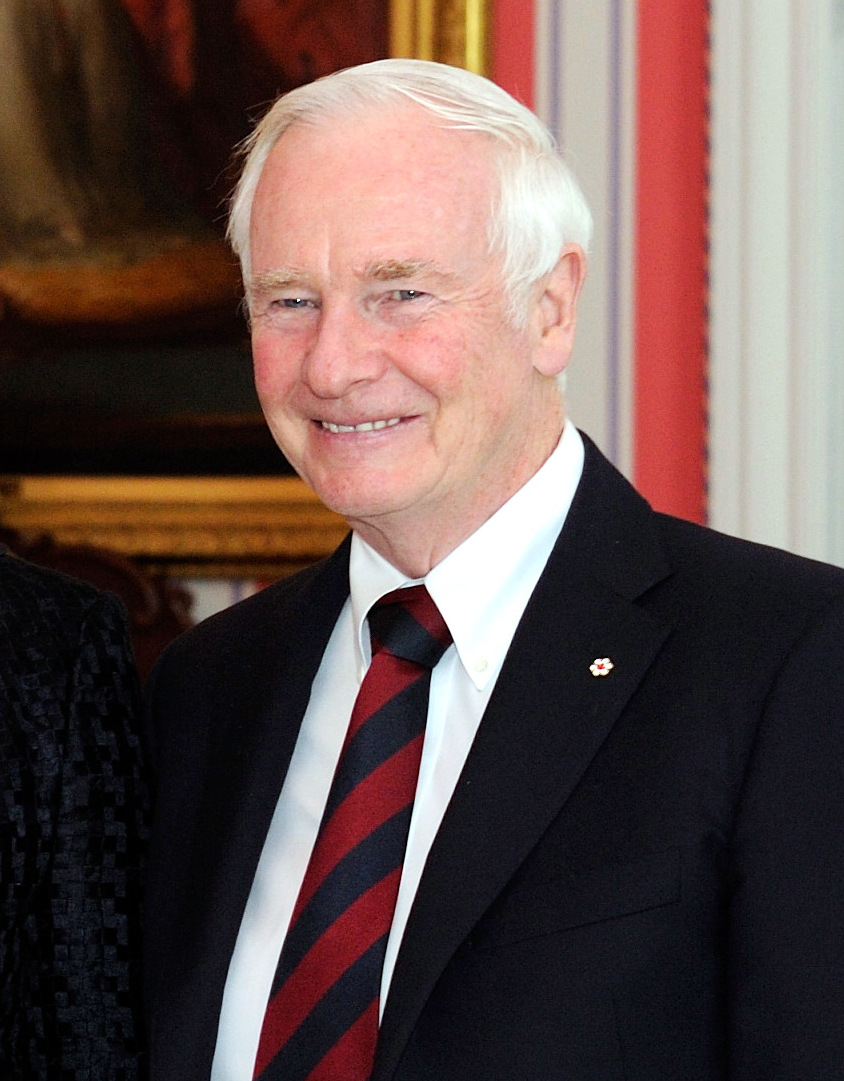
- Johnston in 2011

28th Governor General of Canada
- In office October 1, 2010 – October 2, 2017
- Monarch: Elizabeth II
- Prime Minister: Stephen Harper; Justin Trudeau
- Preceded by: Michaëlle Jean
- Succeeded by: Julie Payette

Personal details
- Born: David Lloyd Johnston; June 28, 1941 (age 85) Sudbury, Ontario, Canada
- Spouse: Sharon Downey (m. 1964)
- Children: 5, including Alex
- Education: Harvard University (BA); Trinity Hall, Cambridge (LLB); Queen's University (LLB)

David Lloyd Johnston (born June 28, 1941) is a Canadian academic, author, and statesman who served as the 28th governor general of Canada from 2010 to 2017. Johnston was the special rapporteur appointed to investigate reports of foreign interference in recent Canadian federal elections until his resignation on June 9, 2023.

Johnston was born and raised in Ontario, studying there before enrolling at Harvard University and later Cambridge and Queen's universities. He went on to work as a professor at various post-secondary institutions in Canada, eventually serving administrative roles as dean of law at the University of Western Ontario, principal of McGill University, and president of the University of Waterloo. At the same time, Johnston involved himself with politics and public service, moderating political debates and chairing commissions in both the federal and provincial spheres, his most renowned position in that field being the chairmanship of the inquiry into the Airbus affair. He was in 2010 appointed as governor general by then monarch Queen Elizabeth II, on the recommendation of then prime minister of Canada Stephen Harper, to replace Michaëlle Jean as viceroy and he occupied the post until succeeded by Julie Payette in 2017.

Johnston also served as a teacher of law at various Canadian universities, dean of law at University of Western Ontario Law School, on various boards, as commissioner of the Leaders' Debates Commission, and as Colonel of the Regiment for the Royal Canadian Regiment.

== Early life and education ==
Johnston was born on June 28, 1941, in Sudbury, Ontario, to Lloyd Johnston, the owner of a hardware store, and Dorothy Stonehouse. He attended Sault Collegiate Institute in Sault Ste. Marie, where he played quarterback for the football team and under-17 hockey with future National Hockey League (NHL) members Phil and Tony Esposito and Lou Nanne. Johnston aimed to play in the NHL himself and was visited by scout Jimmy Skinner. However, upon learning from Skinner that most boys drafted would not be completing high school, Johnston's mother refused to negotiate further.

Johnston graduated from high school and moved on to Harvard University in 1959, earning his Bachelor of Arts degree, magna cum laude, in 1963. While at Harvard, under the coaching of Cooney Weiland, Johnston captained the varsity ice hockey team, was twice selected to the All-America team, and met and befriended Erich Segal, the two becoming jogging partners. In 1970, Segal wrote the best-selling novel Love Story, basing a character in the book—Davey, a captain of the hockey team—on Johnston. Johnston suffered three concussions from playing football and hockey; he was told by his doctor to either wear a helmet (at a time when they were unpopular) or stop playing hockey.

Upon completing his degree at Harvard, Johnston again looked at an NHL career, contemplating attending the Boston Bruins training camp. Instead, he attended Trinity Hall, Cambridge, obtaining a Bachelor of Laws with honours in 1965, and another with first class honours from Queen's University in 1966. During that period, Johnston married his high school sweetheart, Sharon, with whom he has five daughters. Johnston was hired by Osler, Hoskin & Harcourt, but never worked for the firm, instead taking a one-year leave of absence, which continues to today.

== Academic career ==
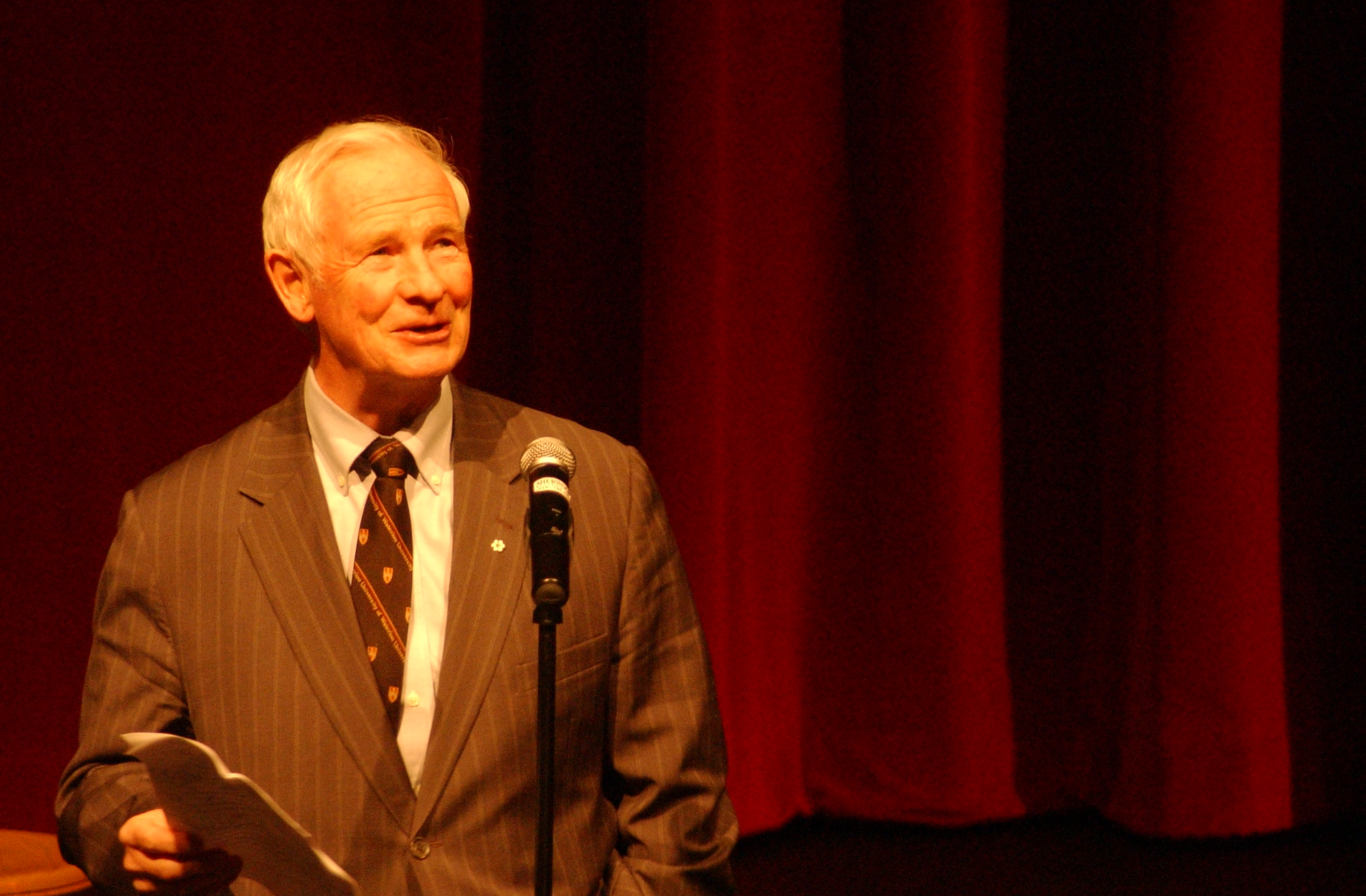
Johnston, then President of the University of Waterloo, introducing Justin Trudeau as a speaker at the university, March 2006

Johnston has had a long academic career, during which he came to specialize in securities regulation, corporation law, public policy and information technology law. After 1966, he worked for two years as an assistant professor at the Queen's University Faculty of Law and then joined the University of Toronto's law faculty, where he taught until 1974, eventually being promoted to the rank of full professor. Johnston was then appointed as dean of the University of Western Ontario Law School, serving between 1974 and 1979, at which time he was elevated to become the fourteenth Principal and Vice-Chancellor of McGill University. It was during his time in that role that he became acquainted with Pierre and Margaret Trudeau, as the Johnston children played with the Trudeau children when the families were at their adjacent cottages in the Laurentians.

It was also during Johnston's time at McGill, in 1981, that he went on the first of what would be a dozen visits to China as a university president. At an Innovation Forum held at Nanking University on 21 October 2013, Johnston described "Nanjing University [as his] second home and [his] home away from home."

Johnston stepped down in 1994 as principal of McGill to remain at the university only as a law professor until he was, in 1999, installed as the fifth president of the University of Waterloo. During that period, the couple acquired a home in Heidelberg, Ontario, and began operating an adjacent horse training ranch, Chatterbox Farm. Johnston, in 2006, along with Jim Balsillie and the mayor of Waterloo, established a Waterloo Steering Committee to "educate business leaders, academics, and citizens about the challenges Waterloo faces and engage them in setting goals for educational achievement, access to services, investment in infrastructure, and social inclusion." At the university, Johnston forged academic exchanges with universities and technological institutes. With his "strong support", the University of Waterloo established a Confucius Institute and Sino-Canadian College in partnership with Nanjing University in 2005.

== Boards, commissions, and media (until 2010) ==
Johnston has moderated several televised leaders' debates, the first being between Pierre Trudeau, Joe Clark, and Ed Broadbent, prior to the 1979 federal election, and he returned five years later to play the same role before the election of 1984, in a debate featuring Brian Mulroney, John Turner, and Broadbent. He also moderated the provincial leaders' debate featuring David Peterson, Bob Rae, and Larry Grossman, in the run up to the Ontario general election in 1987. Johnston has also acted as moderator of two public affairs panel discussion programmes, The Editors and The World in Review, which aired in the 1990s on both CBC Newsworld in Canada and PBS in the United States.

Investigations commissioned by both federal and provincial Crowns-in-Council have been chaired by Johnston, starting with the National Round Table on the Environment and the Economy in the late 1980s, followed by the National Task Force on High Speed Broadband Access, the Committee on Information Systems for the Environment, the Advisory Committee on Online Learning, Ontario's Infertility and Adoption Review Panel between 2008 and 2009, and other scientific or public policy panels. He also sat on the Ontario government's Task Force on Management of Large Scale Information and Information Technology Projects and an Ontario Ministry of Health panel investigating "smart systems." Johnston further served on various corporate boards of directors, including those of Fairfax Financial Holdings, CGI Group, Dominion Textiles, Southam Incorporated, SPAR Aerospace, Seagram's, and Canada Trust, among others, and on March 22, 2010, was named to the Board of Governors of the Stratford Shakespeare Festival. He is the only non-American citizen to chair the Harvard Board of Overseers.

On November 14, 2007, Johnston was appointed by Governor General Michaëlle Jean, on the advice of Prime Minister Stephen Harper, as an independent adviser and charged with drafting for the Cabinet the terms of reference for the public inquiry, known as the Oliphant Commission, into the Airbus affair. This appointment itself, however, was criticized by the independent citizens' group Democracy Watch as a conflict of interest, given that Johnston had once reported directly to Mulroney during the latter's time as prime minister. Johnston completed his report on January 11, 2008, listing seventeen questions of interest for further investigation. He did not, however, include as a subject the awarding of the Airbus contract, on the basis that this aspect had already been investigated by the Royal Canadian Mounted Police, prompting criticism from opposition members of parliament and accusations that Johnston had acted as the prime minister's man. This intensified after it was later revealed that Mulroney had accepted $300,000 in cash from Karlheinz Schreiber, but Oliphant could not examine any possible link between that payment and Airbus due to the narrow scope of the commission's mandate. Others, though, such as Peter George, then-president of McMaster University, and subsequently the editorial board of The Globe and Mail, as well as Andrew Coyne in Maclean's, defended Johnston, detailing his integrity and independence. Johnston's role as special adviser was parodied by Roger Abbott on the January 11, 2008, airing of Air Farce Live.

For this corporate, government, charitable, and academic work, Johnston was in 1988 appointed to the Order of Canada as an officer; he was promoted within the order to the rank of companion in 1997. Johnston also gained a reputation as a non-partisan individual, but has expressed explicit support for Canadian federalism, having written a book opposing Quebec separatism, If Quebec Goes: The Real Cost of Separation. He has also published numerous books on law, chapters in other volumes, magazine articles, and aided in writing legislation. and sat as the co-chair of the Montreal No Committee during the 1995 Quebec referendum on independence.

== As Governor General-designate ==
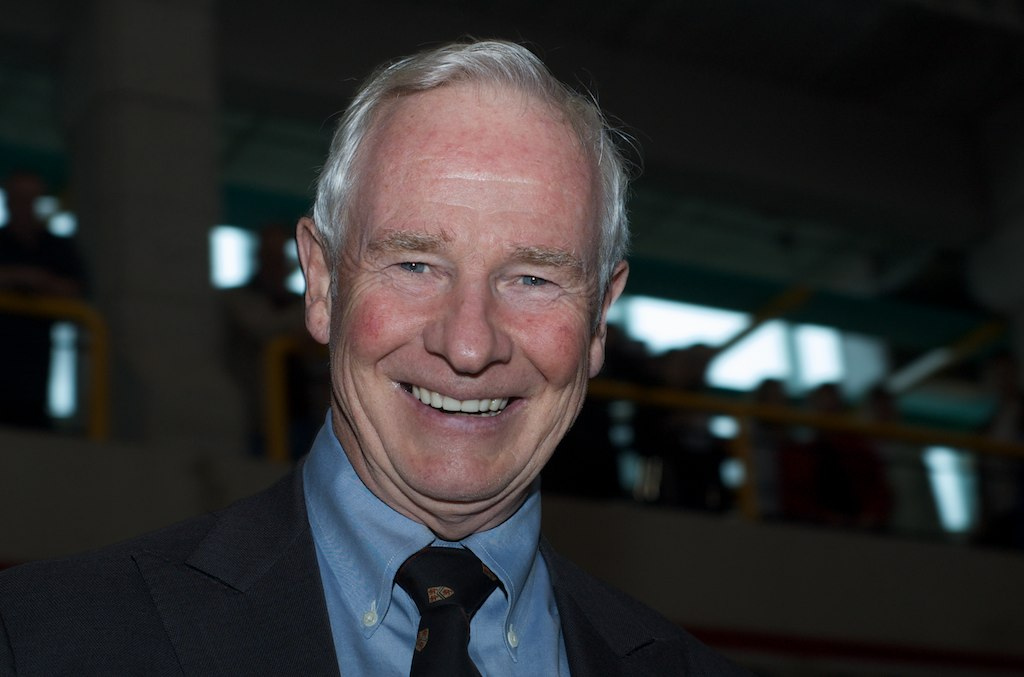
Johnston at the University of Waterloo, 2010

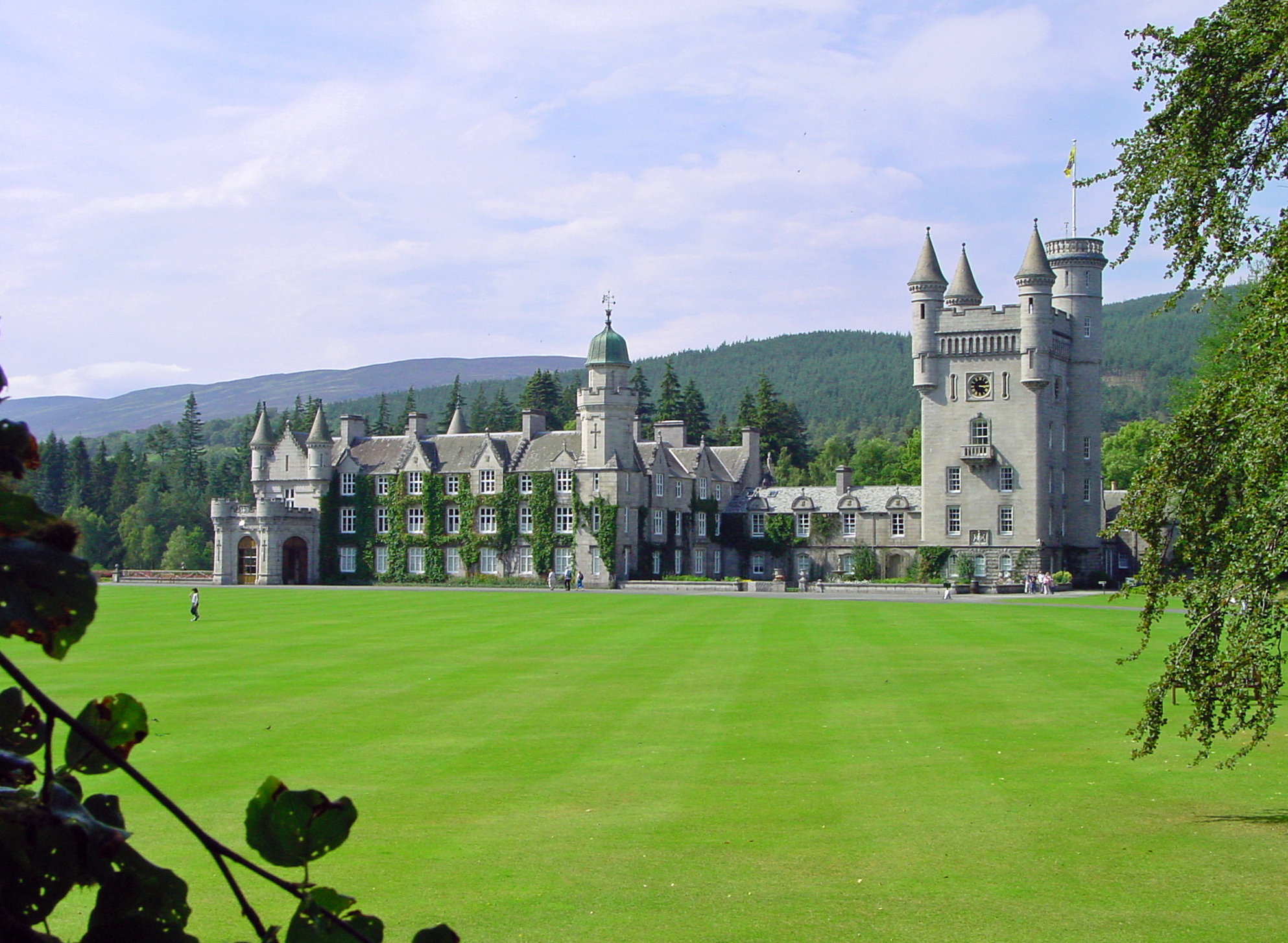
Balmoral Castle, where Johnston met with Queen Elizabeth II prior to his installation as governor general

On July 8, 2010, the Office of the Prime Minister of Canada announced that Queen Elizabeth II had approved Prime Minister Stephen Harper's recommendation of Johnston to succeed Michaëlle Jean as the Queen's representative.

A special search committee convened by the prime minister recommended Johnston for the viceregal position; the group was headed by Sheila-Marie Cook, secretary to the governor general, and further consisted of Kevin MacLeod, the Canadian secretary to the queen, Usher of the Black Rod of the Senate of Canada, and parliament's top protocol officer; Christopher Manfredi, dean of the Faculty of Arts at McGill University; Rainer Knopff, a political scientist at the University of Calgary; Father Jacques Monet, of the Canadian Institute of Jesuit Studies; and Christopher McCreery, historian and private secretary to the lieutenant governor of Nova Scotia. The committee conducted extensive national consultations with over 200 people including academics, sitting and retired political leaders of all political persuasions including provincial premiers, current and former political party leaders, former prime ministers and others in order to develop a short list of candidates for the position. Also on the short list were other distinguished Canadians, including John de Chastelain and John Fraser.

The appointment was widely praised, its announcement garnering positive words from individuals like former University of Toronto president Robert Prichard, columnist Andrew Coyne, and Opposition Leader Michael Ignatieff.

The press in Quebec generally focused on Johnston's ties to McGill University and his prominent role during the 1995 Quebec referendum. The president of Quebec's Conseil de la souveraineté, Gérald Larose, declared Johnston to be an "adversary" of Quebec independence and Mario Beaulieu, head of the Saint-Jean-Baptiste Society, called the nomination of Johnston "partisan" and the governor general-designate himself a "federalist extremist", statements that columnist Richard Martineau criticized for creating a "fake scandal", since any governor general of Canada would advocate for Canadian unity. In addition, Johnston's low profile was expected to result in less criticism directed at the governor general's office, compared to his two predecessors.

The queen issued on September 3, 2010, under the royal sign-manual and Great Seal of Canada, her commission naming Johnston as her next Canadian representative and, three days later, Johnston attended an audience with the queen during a two-day stay at Balmoral Castle. At that time he was invested by the monarch as a commander of both the Order of Military Merit and Order of Merit of the Police Forces. Johnston then announced to the media that there would be a theme to his installation ceremony: A call to service; he elaborated: "This theme of service echoes that of Her Majesty the Queen's 2010 visit 'Honouring the Canadian Record of Service—Past, Present and Future,' and illustrates how the governor general exemplifies the Canadian value of service to community and country."

== Governor General of Canada ==
=== First months ===
Johnston's swearing-in took place on Parliament Hill, in Ottawa, on October 1, 2010. At his request, the ceremony included Johnston and his wife meeting 143 Canadians (one for each year passed since Confederation), especially from the Canadian Forces and young people, and collecting 26 red and white roses from 13 individuals, one from each of Canada's 10 provinces and 3 territories. On the return coach ride from Parliament Hill to Rideau Hall, the viceregal couple stopped to lay the bouquet at the Tomb of the Unknown Soldier.

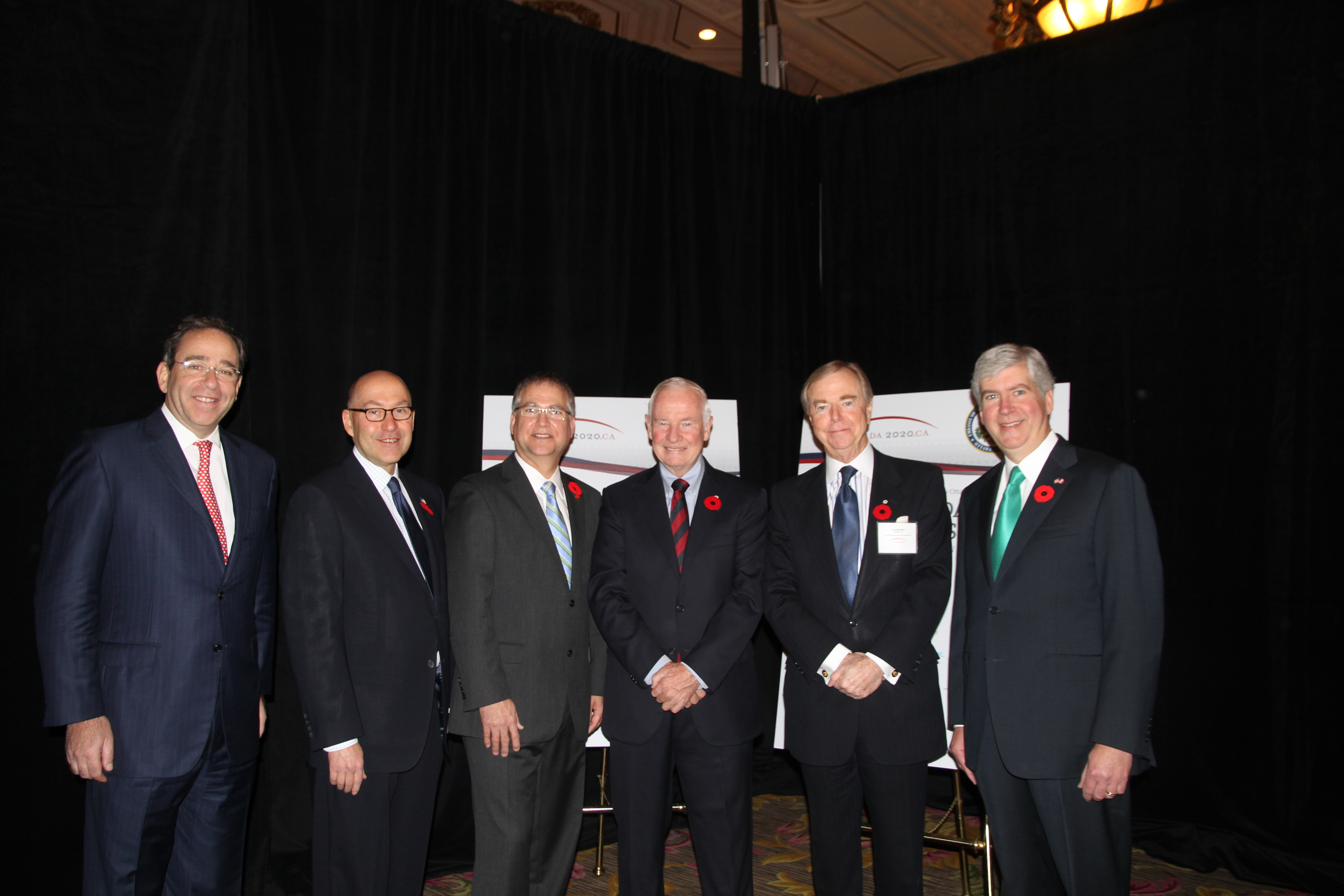
Johnston (third from right) with (from left to right) Thomas R. Nides, David Jacobson, Gary Goodyear, Don Newman, and Rick Snyder at the US-Canada Partnership: Enhancing the Innovation Ecosystem conference at the Château Laurier in Ottawa, November 2, 2011

One of Johnston's first duties as governor general was to perform the rare task of revoking the commissioning scrolls of an officer of Her Majesty's Canadian Forces, on October 22, 2010, at the direction of the chief of the defence staff, stripping the recently convicted murderer and rapist Russell Williams of his rank of colonel and releasing him from duty under "service misconduct". On November 4, the governor general made his first visit to Afghanistan to meet with Canadian troops serving there and the Afghan forces they were training; similar visits to Afghanistan followed through Johnston's tenure, including a Christmas spent with Canadian Forces personnel stationed at Camp Alamo and Camp Black Horse, as did meetings with members of the military in other locations overseas.

Johnston undertook his first state visits in February and March 2011, journeying to Kuwait (to attend its 50th Independence Day and take part in the celebrations of the fifth anniversary of the accession of Emir Sabah Al-Ahmad Al-Jaber Al-Sabah) and Qatar. He then, in April of the same year, attended the wedding of Prince William, Duke of Cambridge, and Catherine Middleton and the reception at Buckingham Palace that followed. In late June, he hosted the couple at various events during their tour of Canada.

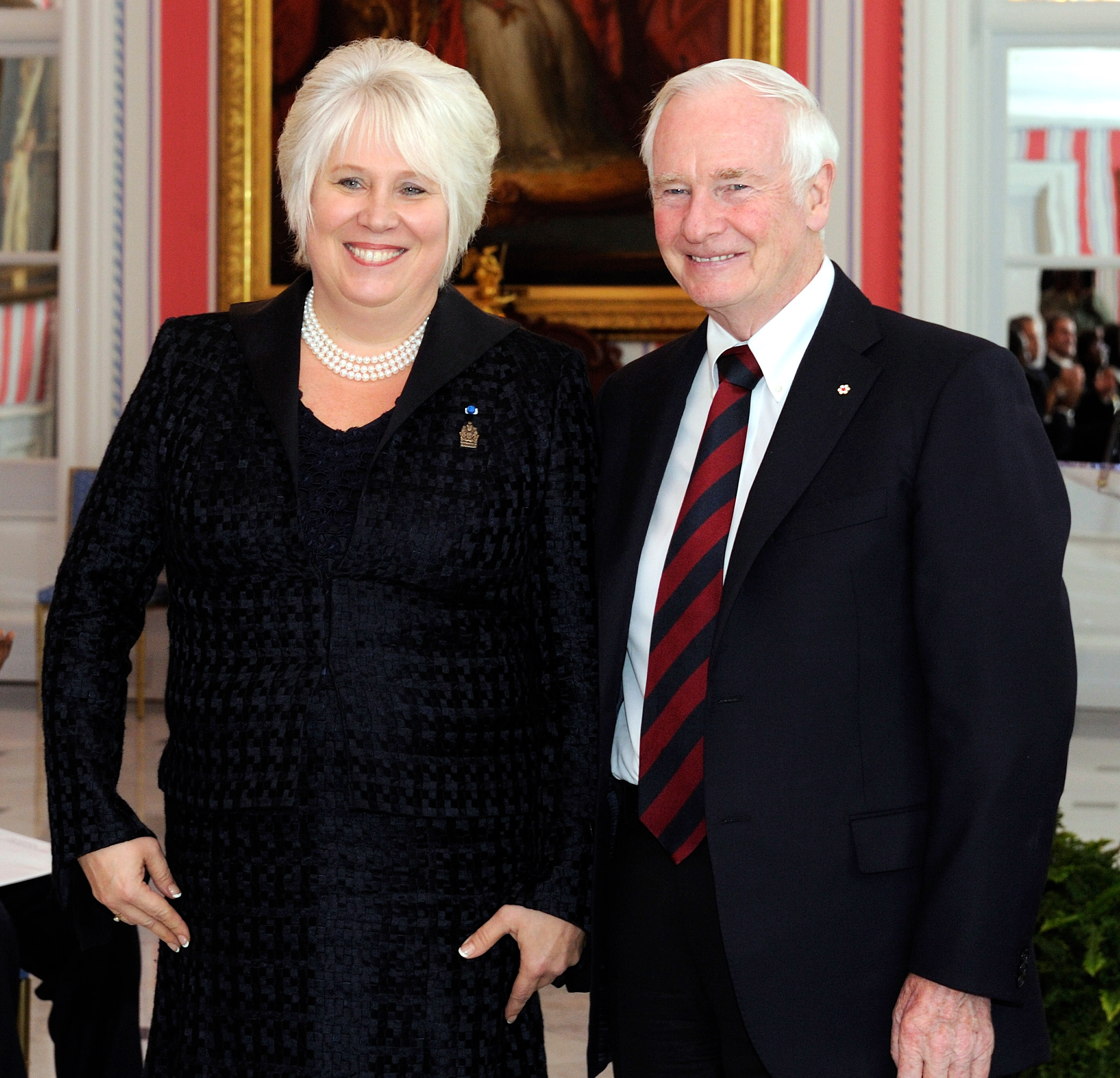
Johnston with Marina Kaljurand, Ambassador to Canada for Estonia, at Rideau Hall, December 1, 2011

The speech Johnston delivered on August 14, 2011, to the Canadian Bar Association's annual meeting in Halifax, Nova Scotia, attracted media attention for its criticism of the legal profession: the Governor General lamented unnecessary and deliberate legal delays across Canada, the role of unscrupulous American lawyers in the unfolding of the 2008 financial crisis, and said the profession was losing the public's trust. These comments were noted for being unusually controversial for a viceroy, but Johnston's colleagues and the editorial board of The Globe and Mail found the Governor General's words to be both unsurprising and welcome.

In keeping with his focus on education, the governor general, beginning in his early months in office and continuing throughout his time there, visited a number of universities across Canada, attending conferences, delivering lectures, and speaking at convocations. He also carried this theme on during his state and official visits to foreign countries, including in his itinerary, among other events, tours of early education facilities, delivering addresses at universities and colleges, and meetings with economic and social development groups, as well as education ministers. He was also sometimes accompanied by Canadian university and college presidents.

=== Queen's Diamond Jubilee, First Nations issues, and the War of 1812 ===
On Accession Day, February 6, 2012, Johnston took part in events launching Diamond Jubilee Week, marking the 60th anniversary of the accession of Queen Elizabeth II to the Canadian throne. He thereafter participated in related commemorations, parties, and unveilings of monuments all across the country, throughout the year, as well as during a working visit to the Commonwealth realm Barbados between a visit to Brazil and a state visit to Trinidad and Tobago. Johnston later hosted Prince Charles, Prince of Wales, and Camilla, Duchess of Cornwall, on their tour of parts of Canada for the jubilee celebration and, in June, travelled to London, UK, to take part in various events held there for the jubilee. He then returned to London between July 25 and 30, to attend the Summer Olympics.

In January 2012, the governor general opened the Crown-First Nations summit in Ottawa and at Rideau Hall hosted a meeting with First Nations youth leaders. By the end of the year, in the midst of the First Nations' Idle No More movement, national focus was turned partly on Johnston after Chief of the Attawapiskat First Nation Theresa Spence began a protest, deemed a "hunger strike", against certain First Nations-related actions by the federal government and parliament and vowed publicly to continue until both Prime Minister Harper and the governor general together met with her. The Assembly of First Nations also on December 16 issued an open letter the Governor General calling for a meeting to discuss Spence's demands. A meeting between the prime minister, other Cabinet ministers, First Nations chiefs, and representatives of the Assembly of First Nations took place on January 11, 2013, but Johnston declined to attend, as "it was not appropriate" for the representative of a constitutional monarch to publicly participate in discussions on government policy. This, along with other factors, led Spence and other chiefs to boycott the Prime Minister's conference, though she did attend the meeting and ceremony for First Nations chiefs that Johnston hosted at Rideau Hall the same evening. Spence declared after that she was not satisfied with the content of that gathering, vowed to continue her protest, and she and the Governor General communicated directly via letter. Spence ended her protest on January 24, 2013, though the demand for a meeting of First Nations chiefs, Cabinet ministers, and the governor general together remained in a declaration signed by Spence and two leaders in Her Majesty's Loyal Opposition.

The bicentennial of the commencement of the War of 1812 was also marked by various official events attended by the governor general. During the royal tour, Johnston and Prince Charles were on May 22 at a military event at Fort York in Toronto and Johnston was also in the region of Niagara-on-the-Lake on June 16, for various events at Queenston Heights, the Laura Secord homestead, and Fort George, to "launch 1,000 days of commemorations". A War of 1812 National Recognition Ceremony was also conducted at Rideau Hall on October 25, 2012, at which the governor general presented special medals and a banner to leaders of First Nations and Métis communities with historical ties to the War of 1812.

The Governor General served as an honorary witness in the Truth and Reconciliation Commission. When the commission's work was completed in December 2015, Johnston presided over a closing ceremony at Rideau Hall, which book-ended the commission along with the opening ceremony hosted by Johnston's viceregal predecessor. He called for expanded education about the residential school system and said "this is a moment for national reflection and introspection... to think about the depth of our commitment to tolerance, respect and inclusiveness, and whether we can do better. This is a moment to think about those people – those children, those mothers and fathers, those families and those elders, past and present. And it's also a moment to ask: where do we go from here?"

Columnist John Robson said Johnston displayed a "manifest sympathy for aboriginal causes". However, the governor general drew criticism on social media as a consequence of his saying, in an interview on the Canadian Broadcasting Corporation's radio show The House, on June 17, 2017, that "we're a country based on immigration, going right back to our, quote, Indigenous people, unquote, who were immigrants as well, 10, 12, 14,000 years ago", referring to the migration of humans across Beringia. Johnston explained he misspoke and apologized for his statement during a ceremony at Rideau Hall to honour leadership on Indigenous issues.

=== Education promotion and charitable foundations ===
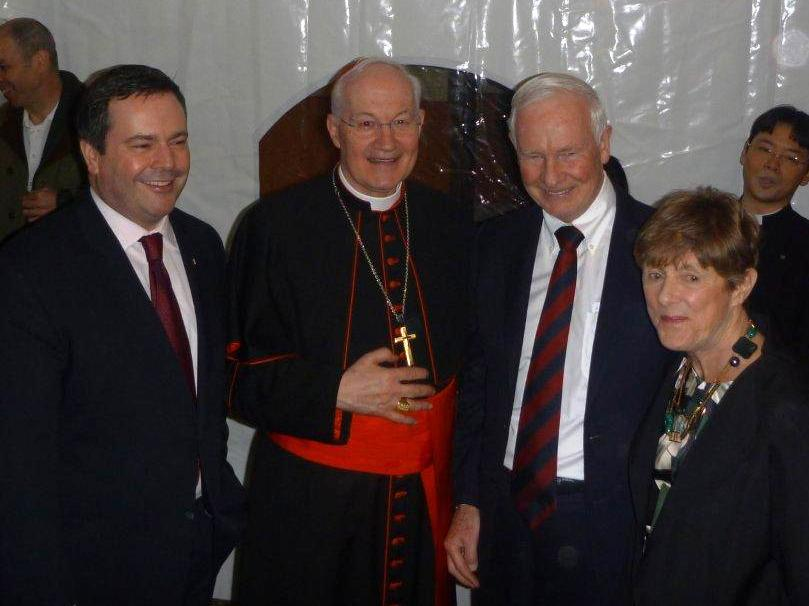
Johnston with Cardinal Marc Ouellet and Jason Kenney the evening preceding the papal inauguration of Pope Francis

Johnston was credited with encouraging his prime minister to reinvigorate the federal government's promotion of international educational cooperation. Johnston was advised by Harper to lead an Association of Universities and Colleges of Canada to Brazil in 2012 to participate in a hemispheric conference on international education, hoping it would "lead to more Brazilians choosing Canada as their preferred place to conduct research and study."

As part of his efforts to promote education and research, Johnston, beginning in 2012, annually hosted the Killiam Award Symposium at Rideau Hall. In regard to philanthropy, the governor general established in late 2013 the Rideau Hall Foundation, a charitable group meant to aid the viceroy in connecting and honouring Canadians, enhancing Canadian identity, and increasing potential for excellence with the aid of certain partners. Johnston then launched, via the foundation, the My Giving Moment campaign, encouraging Canadians to donate their time and/or money. He was aided in the launch by George Stroumboulopoulos, who interviewed the governor general on his show George Stroumboulopoulos Tonight. Johnston stated near the end of his tenure that he would remain as chairman of the Rideau Hall Foundation after his successor took office.

In late 2016, the governor general hosted a conference on concussions, declaring head injuries in sports to be a "public health issue", and criticized the NHL's position on fighting in hockey. This followed on his remark made in early 2012 to the Canadian Broadcasting Corporation that hockey should be made safer by redesigning hard-plastic equipment, eliminating head shots and high-sticking, and eliminating fighting, which he said in a later interview was "eroding the game". He called on the NHL to hold a summit on fighting and concussions. While Johnston did speak with NHL commissioner Gary Bettman and the deputy commissioners about a two-day conference that would, with the involvement of medical experts and individuals associated with hockey, decide on new game rules, the group of people involved became too large to manage. Johnston instead turned his attention to the Amateur Hockey Association of Canada and raising awareness among parents.

=== Continued viceregal service ===
On March 19, 2013, Johnston headed the official Canadian delegation for the papal inauguration of Pope Francis. On November 1, 2013, he hosted Prince Edward, Earl of Wessex, at the 50th anniversary of the Duke of Edinburgh's Award royal gala, held at Rideau Hall.

Johnston accepted an invitation, offered in March 2015, to stay in the viceregal office until September 2017. This was considered desirable in order to ensure that an experienced viceroy was in-place should the 2015 Canadian federal election result in a minority government or otherwise be inconclusive. By the end of his tenure, Johnston became the longest-serving governor general since Georges Vanier. It was also thought worthwhile for Johnston to remain in office for the Canada 150 celebrations.

As part of his viceregal duties, Johnston undertook two state visits to China, where he met with General Secretary of the Chinese Communist Party Xi Jinping. The first, in October 2013, came shortly after Xi had become the CCP General Secretary as well as the paramount leader, and overlapped with visits by cabinet ministers, and was aimed at smoothing relations and promoting the government's economic agenda. During the trip, Johnston also met with several Chinese officials, including Premier Li Keqiang, to discuss ways to deepen educational and cultural ties between Canada and China. The second, in July 2017, was part of a goodwill mission ahead of exploratory trade talks. His second trip received criticism from journalists, as it happened while Chinese dissident Liu Xiaobo died in custody. Johnston stated to CTV News after the 2017 visit that he had discussed the matter of Liu and human rights with Xi.

As governor general, Johnston hosted over 600 events at either Rideau Hall or La Citadelle and, as commander-in-chief, attended 330 military events. Within Canada, Johnston visited more than 130 communities and, as part of the country's international relations, he led more than 50 international visits, making him the most travelled governor general in Canadian history. Conversely, he hosted approximately five dozen foreign dignitaries on state and working visits to Canada. The Governor General delivered over 1,400 speeches and awarded tens of thousands of honours, medals, and special commemorations and welcomed 1.5 million Canadians to Rideau Hall and the Citadel.

=== Legacy ===
On September 27, 2017, in the week of his departure, Johnston presided over a military farewell ceremony and military parade by a 100-man guard of honour from the Canadian Armed Forces at the Aviation and Space Museum. There, he stated, "serving as governor general is a responsibility I have cherished for the past seven years. I am profoundly grateful for the opportunity to give back to this country I love so much." A few days before Johnston completed his service, Trudeau described him as a family friend, "a man of strength, intelligence and compassion." The Government of Canada will donate $3 million, and up to $7 million in matching funds over 10 years, to the Rideau Hall Foundation, a charity founded by Johnston. Its goal, he said, "is to gather, align and mobilize ideas, people and resources to move the Canadian spirit and our shared aspirations forward".

U Sports renamed the U Sports University Cup to the David Johnston University Cup in 2018.

== Post-viceregal life ==
Shortly after the end of his viceregal tenure, Johnston joined the consulting firm Deloitte as an executive advisor. Johnston also holds a volunteer position as chair of the Rideau Hall Foundation, the charity he established in 2012. Johnston has been a member of the Pierre Elliott Trudeau Foundation since 2018. Johnston was appointed colonel of the Royal Canadian Regiment on August 4, 2018, succeeding Major-General (Retired) J. Ivan Fenton.

In October 2018, Johnston was nominated to be the first commissioner of the Leaders' Debates Commission by the Cabinet headed by Justin Trudeau. Johnston was subsequently confirmed to the position. However, he resigned the post after Trudeau, on March 15, 2023, chose Johnston to act as special rapporteur investigating Chinese government interference in the 2019 and 2021 Canadian federal elections. Politicians and journalists voiced both disapproval—concerns mainly focusing on Johnston's relationship with the Trudeau family, membership in the Pierre Elliott Trudeau Foundation, and state visits to China he made as governor general—and approval—citing his experience as a legal scholar and dean of law and the trust placed on him by Harper to act as an impartial referee while serving as governor general during a period of parliamentary instability. Johnston said that he felt "privileged" to have been appointed and described attempts to undermine the country's democracy as "serious matters". In a report published in May 2023, Johnston argued that a public inquiry would be of little use in a case involving so much confidential information, an opinion for which he was sharply criticised. Following a parliamentary motion calling for Johnston to step down from his role, which passed 174–150 on May 29, he tendered his resignation on June 9, 2023.

== Honours and arms ==
Viceregal styles of David Lloyd Johnston (2010–2017)
- Reference style: His Excellency the Right Honourable; Son Excellence le très honorable
- Spoken style: Your Excellency; Votre Excellence

Ribbon	Description	Notes
	Order of Canada (CC)	Extraordinary Companion of the Order in 2010
	Order of Military Merit (CMM)	Commander of the Order in 2010
	Order of Merit of the Police Forces (COM)	Commander of the Order in 2010
	Order of St John of Jerusalem	Knight of Justice of the Order in 2010
	125th Anniversary of the Confederation of Canada Medal	
	Queen Elizabeth II Golden Jubilee Medal	
	Queen Elizabeth II Diamond Jubilee Medal	
	Canadian Forces' Decoration (CD)	
	King Willem-Alexander Investiture Medal	

Appointments

- July 11, 1988 – October 23, 1997: Officer of the Order of Canada (OC)
  - October 23, 1997 – October 1, 2010: Companion of the Order of Canada (CC)
  - October 1, 2010 – May 8, 2013: Chancellor and Principal Companion of the Order of Canada (CC)
  - May 8, 2013 – October 2, 2017: Chancellor and Principal and extraordinary Companion of the Order of Canada (CC)
  - October 2, 2017 –: Extraordinary Companion of the Order of Canada (CC)
- September 5, 2010 – October 1, 2010: Commander of the Order of Military Merit (CMM)
  - October 1, 2010 – May 8, 2013: Chancellor and Commander of the Order of Military Merit (CMM)
  - May 8, 2013 – October 2, 2017: Chancellor and extraordinary Commander of the Order of Military Merit (CMM)
  - October 2, 2017 –: Extraordinary Commander of the Order of Military Merit (CMM)
- September 5, 2010 – October 1, 2010: Commander of the Order of Merit of the Police Forces (COM)
  - October 1, 2010 – October 2, 2017: Chancellor and Commander of the Order of Merit of the Police Forces (COM)
  - October 2, 2017 –: Commander of the Order of Merit of the Police Forces (COM)
- October 1, 2010 – October 2, 2017: Knight of Justice, Prior, and Chief Officer in Canada of the Most Venerable Order of the Hospital of Saint John of Jerusalem (KStJ)
  - October 2, 2017 –: Knight of Justice of the Most Venerable Order of the Hospital of Saint John of Jerusalem (KStJ)
- October 1, 2010 –: Patron of the Royal Military Colleges Club of Canada
- October 1, 2010 – April 19, 2013: Chief Scout of Canada
  - April 19, 2013 – October 2, 2017: Patron Scout of Canada
- October 23, 2010 –: President Emeritus of the University of Waterloo
- November 25, 2010 –: Honorary Fellow of the Royal Society of Canada (FRSC(hon))
- December 30, 2010 –: Patron of SOS Children's Villages Canada
- July 19, 2012 – October 2, 2017: Honorary Chief Commissioner of the Canadian Coast Guard
- October 19, 2012 –: Honorary Fellow of the Royal College of Physicians and Surgeons of Canada (FRCPSC(hon))
- March 26, 2018 –: Membership of the Queen's Privy Council for Canada, giving him the honorific title "The Right Honourable" and the Post Nominal Letters "PC" for Life.
- April 18, 2018, He was given the Key to the City of Ottawa by Mayor of Ottawa Jim Watson.

Medals

- 1992: 125th Anniversary of the Confederation of Canada Medal
- 2002: Queen Elizabeth II Golden Jubilee Medal
- October 1, 2010: Canadian Forces' Decoration (CD)
- February 6, 2012: Queen Elizabeth II Diamond Jubilee Medal

Awards

- November 8, 2010: Confederation Centre of the Arts Symons Medal

Foreign honours

- 1988: Member of the Harvard Sports Hall of Fame
- 2013: Honorary Member of Phi Beta Kappa society, Harvard University chapter
- May 28, 2013: Fulbright Canada Award
- 2018: King Willem-Alexander Investiture Medal 2013

=== Honorary military appointments ===
- October 1, 2010 – October 2, 2017: Colonel of the Governor General's Horse Guards
- October 1, 2010 – October 2, 2017: Colonel of the Governor General's Foot Guards
- October 1, 2010 – October 2, 2017: Colonel of the Canadian Grenadier Guards
- August 4, 2018 – : Colonel of The Regiment, The Royal Canadian Regiment

=== Honorary degrees ===
- 1980: Law Society of Upper Canada, Doctor of Laws (LLD)
- June 1985: University of Toronto, Doctor of Laws (LLD)
- 1986: Bishop's University, Doctor of Laws (LLD)
- September 30, 1986: Memorial University of Newfoundland, Doctor of Laws (LLD)
- 1987: Montreal Diocesan Theological College, Doctor of Divinity (DD)
- 1989: University of British Columbia, Doctor of Laws (LLD)
- 1991: Queen's University, Doctor of Laws (LLD)
- June 8, 1991: University of Western Ontario, Doctor of Laws (LLD)
- 1992: Université de Montréal, Doctor of Laws (LLD)
- 1993: Algoma University, Doctor of Laws (LLD)
- August 1994: University of Victoria, Doctor of Laws (LLD)
- November 9, 2000: McGill University, Doctor of Laws (LLD)
- November 2008: McMaster University, Doctor of Laws (LLD)
- October 23, 2010: University of Waterloo, Doctor of Laws (LLD)
- June 12, 2011: University of Ottawa, Doctor of Laws (LLD)
- September 1, 2011: Mount Allison University, Doctor of Laws (LLD)
- October 18, 2011: University of Manitoba, Doctor of Laws (LLD)
- April 11, 2012: Nanjing University, doctorate
- June 18, 2012: Algonquin College, degree (Bachelor of Applied Studies)
- November 13, 2012: University of Calgary, Doctor of Laws (LLD)
- May 9, 2013: Huron University College, Doctor of Divinity (DD)
- February 24, 2014: National Law University, Doctor of Laws (LLD)
- May 12, 2014: Wycliffe College at the University of Toronto, Doctor of Sacred Letters (DSL)
- May 15, 2014: University of King's College, Doctor of Civil Law (DCL)
- January 29, 2015: Vancouver Island University, Doctor of Laws (LLD)
- May 14, 2015: Royal Military College of Canada, Doctor of Laws (LLD)
- June 7, 2016: Carleton University, Doctor of Laws (LLD)
- November 3, 2016: Technion – Israel Institute of Technology, Doctor of Philosophy (PhD)
- June 6, 2017: University of Alberta, Doctor of Laws (LLD)
- June 22, 2017: York University, Doctor of Laws (LLD)
- June 1, 2018: Ryerson University, Doctor of Laws (LLD)
- Spring 2019: Mount Royal University, Doctor of Laws (LL.D)
- June 23, 2021: University of Ontario Institute of Technology, Doctor of Laws (LL.D)

=== Other honours ===
- 2000: Renison University College, Honorary Senior Fellow

=== Honorific eponyms ===
Awards

- David Johnston International Experience Awards
- David Johnston University Cup

Geographic locations

- David Johnston Research and Technology Park, University of Waterloo, Waterloo

=== Arms ===
Coat of arms of David Johnston
Notes Just prior to his installation as governor general, Johnston was granted a personal coat of arms. Adopted September 24, 2010 Crest A candle Argent enflamed and within a stand Or flanked by four closed books their spines palewise, two Gules and two Or, all set on a closed book bound Or its edge fesswise Argent. Escutcheon Argent fretty Sable, on a chief Gules the Royal Crown between two open books Or Supporters Two unicorns Gules, armed, maned, tufted, unguled, each charged on the shoulder with an astrolabe Or Compartment a grassy mount Or set with two feet Gules winged Sable and in base a bar wavy Sable inscribed with zeros and ones Or Motto Contemplare Meliora (Latin for 'To envisage better things') Orders The ribbon and insignia of a Companion of the Order of Canada. Desiderantes Meliorem Patriam (They desire a better country) Symbolism The interlaced pattern symbolizes the central role of family and other relationships in his life, as well as his interest in communication networks and his belief in the interconnectedness of knowledge; it also touches on the importance he puts on order and organization. The crown is the traditional symbol of the Governor general. The books refer to knowledge and education, but also to the law. The five books of the crest stand for Johnston's five daughters while the candle refers to enlightenment and the transmission of knowledge. The shield's general design and colours are inspired from various Scottish Johnston arms. The unicorns symbolize dreams, imagination, purity and faithfulness, and their colour stands for Canada. The astrolabe is a reference to intellectual exploration and the rich background of Canadian explorers going back to Jacques Cartier. Their winged feet are traditionally attributed to Hermes. In addition to alluding to communication (also referred to in the zeros and ones, more specifically referring to digital media), they also evoke fitness and sports. The binary code reflects the flow of information in modern society. The Motto is an allusion to a line in George Bernard Shaw's Back to Methuselah ("You see things; and you say, 'Why?' But I dream things that never were; and I say, 'Why not?'").

=== College awards and honours ===
Award	Year
All-ECAC Hockey First Team	1961–62
All-ECAC Hockey First Team	1962–63
AHCA East All-American	1961–62
AHCA East All-American	1962–63
ECAC Hockey All-Tournament First Team	1962
ECAC Hockey All-Tournament First Team	1963
ECAC Hockey Outstanding Defenseman	1962–63

== List of principal works ==
- Cases and Materials on Corporate Finance and Securities Law (1967).
- Computers and Law (1968).
- Cases and Materials on Company Law (1969).
- Cases and Materials on Securities Law (1971).
- Business Associations (1979).
- Canadian Companies and the Stock Exchange (1980).
- Canadian Securities Regulation (1982, 2003, 2006).
- Partnerships and Canadian Business Corporations, Vols. 1 and 2 (1983, 1989, 1992).
- If Quebec Goes ... The Real Cost of Separation (1995).
- Getting Canada On-line: Understanding the Information Highway (1995).
- Cyberlaw (1997).
- Communications in Law in Canada (2000).
- Halsbury's Law of Canada (2007).

Academic offices
Preceded by Robert Edward Bell	Principal and Vice Chancellor of McGill University; 1979–1994	Succeeded by Bernard Shapiro
Preceded by James Downey	President of the University of Waterloo; 1999–2010	Succeeded by Feridun Hamdullahpur
Government offices
Preceded by Michaëlle Jean	Governor General of Canada; 2010–2017	Succeeded by Julie Payette
Order of precedence
Preceded by Michaëlle Jean as Former Governor General	Order of precedence of Canada; As Former Governor General	Succeeded by Julie Payette as Former Governor General
