= 7 Rideau Gate =

Official state guest house in Canada

Coordinates: 45.443964°N 75.692142°W

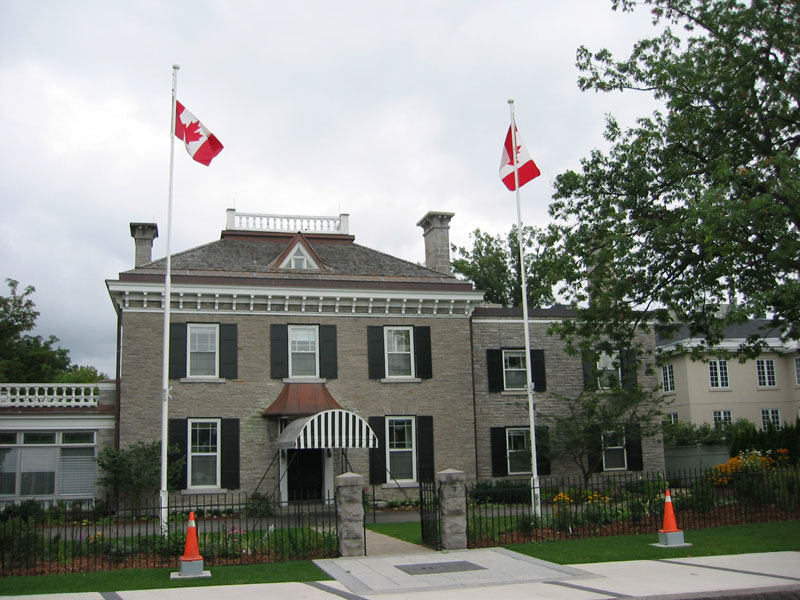
- Main façade of 7 Rideau Gate in 2004
- Interactive map of the 7 Rideau Gate area
- Alternative names: Official Guest Residence

General information
- Architectural style: Georgian Revival
- Location: 7 Rideau Gate, Ottawa, Ontario, Canada
- Completed: 1862
- Renovated: 1966, 1989
- Client: Henry Osgoode Burritt (1862)
- Owner: The King in Right of Canada
- Landlord: National Capital Commission

Design and construction
- Architect: Alan Keefer

7 Rideau Gate is the Canadian government's official state guest house for very important dignitaries, such as visiting heads of government or other high-level officials. The house is located in Ottawa, Ontario, near other official residences such as Rideau Hall and 24 Sussex Drive.

== History ==
The house was built in 1862 for Henry Osgoode Burritt, an Ottawa woollen mill owner. Burritt sold the house in 1873, for the sum of $10,000, to Philemon Wetherall Wright, who named the house 'Edgewood' in acknowledgement of its location (then) at the edge of the town.

The Wrights departed Edgewood three years later, leaving it vacant until it was purchased in 1884 by Octavius Henry Lambart, a son of the 8th Earl of Cavan. The Lambarts remained in the house until 1934, passing it to Octavius' son, Frederick Howard John Lambart.

Commodore Percy W. Nelles, Chief of Staff of the Royal Canadian Navy, became the occupant of 7 Rideau Gate in 1947. He renovated the house to remove its verandas and gut its Victorian interiors.

The last private owner was Thomas Franklin Ahearn (son of the inventor Thomas Ahearn), who further altered the structure by removing the roof walk and adding exterior shutters, a sunroom on the east side of the original building, and a wing on the west side. Ahearn's daughter Lilias, who grew up in the house, would later become the châtelaine of Rideau Hall during her father-in-law Vincent Massey's term as Governor General of Canada.

The property was acquired by the Crown in 1966. The house was, with the assistance of the Canadiana Fund, restored and renovated in 1989 to reinstate historical features, as well as to upgrade the guest facilities. Art and furniture from the National Capital Commission's (NCC) Official Residences Crown Collection are used throughout, as are pieces donated by the Lambart family.

Since 1966, 7 Rideau Gate has generally been used as a guest house for high-level foreign officials who are visiting Canada in an official capacity as guests of the Canadian government. The hospitality offered by the Crown comes via Global Affairs Canada.

Due to renovations at Rideau Hall, 7 Rideau Gate served as an interim residence for then-Governor General Julie Payette.

From March to May 2025, Prime Minister Mark Carney stayed at 7 Rideau Gate for security reasons. He later moved to Rideau Cottage following the 2025 Canadian federal election.

== See also ==
- Official residence
- Blair House (United States)
