= Frederick Preston Rubidge =

Canadian surveyor and architect

- Born: 10 March 1806; London, England
- Died: 16 August 1897 (aged 91); Montreal, Quebec
- Occupation: Architect
- Practice: 1831-1872
- Buildings: Rideau Hall, Rideau Cottage

Frederick Preston Rubidge (10 March 1806 – 16 August 1897) was a surveyor and an architect. He was born in England and emigrated to Upper Canada around 1825 where he took his training.

Rubidge first qualified as a provincial surveyor in 1831 and completed important surveys over the next few years. In 1841, the Board of Works of the Province of Canada (Public Works after 1846) was formed and he was among the initial employees. Much of his work involved design for public buildings. He held the title of assistant engineer but became known as architect for the department. He had various roles associated with the parliament and department buildings in Ottawa. One of the more intriguing projects concerned Rideau Hall, the former home of Thomas McKay, and its conversion to the official residence of the governor general of Canada.

Rubidge was retired in 1872 at the age of sixty five. This unhappy event ended his public career and died in Montreal in 1897.

== Works ==
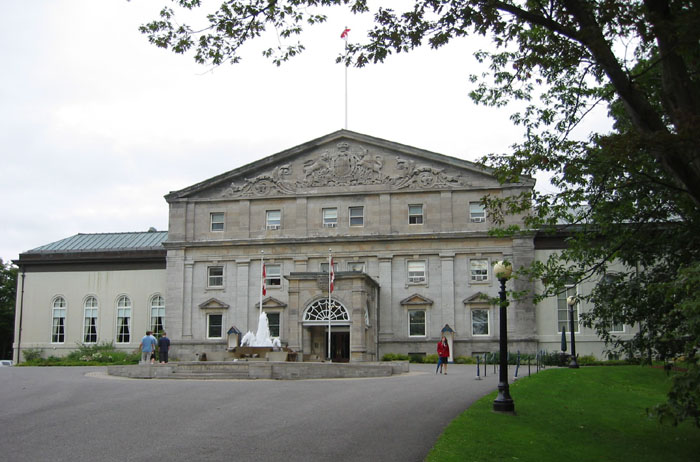
Rideau Hall, Ottawa, Ontario designed by Frederick Preston Rubidge

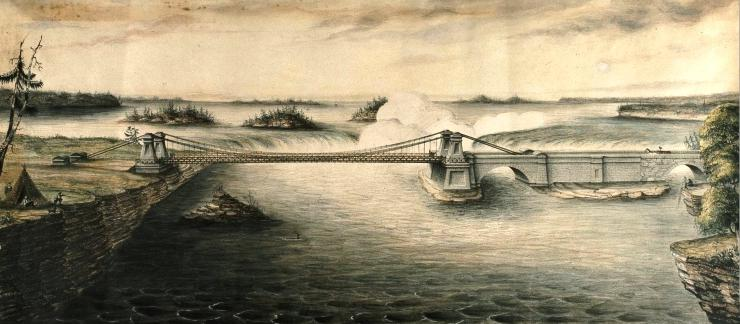
Union Suspension Bridge, Ottawa River, Bytown designed by Frederick Preston Rubidge, 1843
- Montreal court-house (1855–57),
- custom-house in Quebec City, Quebec 1856–58
- custom-house in Kingston, Ontario 1856–58
- custom-house in Hamilton, Ontario 1858
- Saint-Joseph-de-Beauce Courthouse, Quebec, 1859-1862
- Joliette Courthouse, Québec, 1860-62
- Rideau Cottage, Ottawa, Ontario 1866–1867 with Stewart Taylor and Company
