= Lionel Massey =

Canadian civil servant (1916–1965)

Secretary to the Governor General of Canada
- In office February 28, 1952 – September 15, 1959
- Governor-General: Vincent Massey
- Preceded by: H. F. G. Letson
- Succeeded by: Esmond Unwin Butler

Personal details
- Born: July 2, 1916 Toronto, Ontario, Canada
- Died: July 28, 1965 (aged 49) Toronto, Ontario, Canada
- Spouse: Lilias Massey (m. 1946)
- Parent(s): Vincent Massey; Alice Massey
- Relatives: Raymond Massey (uncle); Adrianne Allen (aunt); Daniel and Anna Massey (cousins)

Lionel Massey (July 2, 1916 – July 28, 1965) was a Canadian civil servant and dignitary, most noted for serving as Secretary to the Governor General of Canada during his father Vincent Massey's term as Governor General.

== Biography ==
Born in Toronto to Vincent and Alice Massey, he was educated at Upper Canada College and Balliol College, Oxford. He served in the King's Royal Rifle Corps during World War II, during which he was injured in Greece and spent time as a German prisoner of war.

He returned to Canada in 1944, and married Lilias Ahearn Van Buskirk in 1946. The couple's primary residence was Batterwood House in Canton, Ontario, although they travelled frequently on family business.

His brother Hart also served in WWII, as a Spitfire pilot.

When Vincent Massey was appointed as Governor General in 1952, he appointed Lionel as secretary; as Alice Massey had by this time died and there would be no viceregal consort, Lilias was simultaneously appointed as acting châtelaine of Rideau Hall.

Following the end of Vincent Massey's term in office, Lionel was appointed as administrative director of the Royal Ontario Museum. He was promoted to associate director of the institution in 1963. He also served on the boards of Hart House, Upper Canada College and the Stratford Festival.

He died in Toronto on July 28, 1965, after suffering a stroke.
