= Lilias Massey =

Canadian dignitary

Acting Viceregal consort of Canada
- In office February 28, 1952 – September 15, 1959
- Governor-General: Vincent Massey
- Preceded by: Countess Alexander of Tunis
- Succeeded by: Pauline Vanier

Personal details
- Born: Lilias Evva Ahearn; 1918 Ottawa, Ontario, Canada
- Died: January 19, 1997 (aged 78–79) Ottawa, Ontario, Canada
- Spouses: Douglas Byrd Van Buskirk (died 1941) Lionel Massey (m. 1946; died 1965)
- Parent: T. Franklin Ahearn (father)

Lilias Evva Massey (formerly Van Buskirk; née Ahearn; 1918 – January 19, 1997) was a Canadian dignitary, who served as châtelaine of Rideau Hall during her father-in-law Vincent Massey's term as Governor General of Canada.

Vincent Massey was a widower whose wife Alice died 18 months before his appointment as Governor General. Lilias, who was married to Vincent and Alice Massey's son, Lionel, is to date the only person to have served as the official host or hostess of Rideau Hall who was not the Governor General's spouse.

== Background ==
The daughter of businessman and politician T. Franklin Ahearn, she was raised in Ottawa just a few blocks from Rideau Hall at 7 Rideau Gate. She worked as an ambulance driver for the Red Cross during World War II before marrying Lionel Massey in 1946. She had previously been married to Flying Officer Douglas Byrd Van Buskirk, a Royal Canadian Air Force pilot who died in combat in 1941.

The Masseys resided in Saskatoon, Toronto and Canton, and briefly in London, England, until Vincent Massey was appointed as Governor General in 1952. Being the spouse of a Governor General is an important public role in its own right, thus Vincent Massey's status as a widower necessitated the appointment of an acting châtelaine, and Lilias Massey was selected for the role. Lionel Massey simultaneously served as Secretary to the Governor General of Canada.

== Châtelaine ==
As châtelaine, Massey's duties included hosting visiting dignitaries at Rideau Hall, and accompanying the Governor General on his official state visits and public appearances. During her term as châtelaine, Lionel and Lilias Massey maintained their primary residence at Rideau Cottage on the grounds of Rideau Hall, while also sometimes returning to Batterwood House, the Masseys' private family home in Canton, for weekends and vacations.

In 1953, she accompanied Vincent Massey as Canada's official representatives at the coronation of Queen Elizabeth II, and later hosted a state visit to Ottawa by Dwight Eisenhower. In 1954, the Masseys in turn undertook a state visit to Washington, D.C., and later hosted Queen Elizabeth the Queen Mother at Rideau Hall. In 1955, they hosted Mary, Princess Royal at Rideau Hall.

In 1956, she accompanied Vincent Massey on a tour of the Canadian Arctic, during which she became the first woman ever to fly over the North Pole. Upon the end of the tour, she briefly fell ill and was taken to hospital in The Pas, Manitoba. As of that trip, she had accompanied Vincent Massey on all but two of his 86 official trips across Canada.

In 1957, she was the official presenter of the Lady Tweedsmuir Cup, a women's curling championship trophy named for Susan Buchan, Baroness Tweedsmuir, to the winning Royal Montreal Curling Club.

Other dignitaries she hosted at Rideau Hall included Jawaharlal Nehru, Queen Juliana and Haile Selassie.

== Later life ==
After Vincent Massey stepped down as Governor General, Lionel and Lilias returned to Batterwood House. Following Lionel's death in 1965, Lilias returned to Ottawa, where she lived until her death in 1997.
