= George Robert Parkin =

Canadian educator

Sir George Robert Parkin KCMG
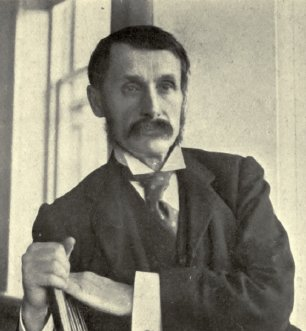
- Born: February 8, 1846; Salisbury, New Brunswick
- Died: June 25, 1922 (aged 76); London, England
- Spouse: Annie Connell Fisher
- Children: Alice Massey

Sir George Robert Parkin KCMG (February 8, 1846 – June 25, 1922) was a Canadian educator, imperialist, and author.

== Life and career ==
Born at Parkindale near Salisbury, New Brunswick, he was a graduate from the University of New Brunswick. From 1867 to 1871, he taught at the Bathurst Grammar School. From 1872 to 1889, he was the headmaster of the Fredericton Collegiate School, where the poets Charles G.D. Roberts, Bliss Carman, and Francis Sherman came under his influence. He attended the University of Oxford in 1873–1874. From 1895 to 1902, he was the headmaster of Upper Canada College.

He was a prominent speaker on behalf of the Imperial Federation League. He was the organizing secretary of the Rhodes Trust (1902–1922) and the Toronto Round Table Group (1910–1922). Lord Milner was an ardent admirer of Parkin's imperial ideas. He was the author of Imperial Federation: The Problem of National Unity (1892) and a school textbook, Round the Empire.

He was appointed Companion of the Order of St Michael and St George in 1898 and Knight Commander of the Order of St Michael and St George (KCMG) in the 1920 New Year Honours for his work with the Rhodes Trust. He was appointed the 2nd President of the Geographical Association from 1912 to 1913.

His daughter Alice married Canadian businessman and diplomat Vincent Massey, who would become governor general of Canada shortly after Alice's death in 1950.

He was the maternal grandfather of the philosopher George Grant.

The former Liberal Party of Canada leader Michael Ignatieff is his great-grandson.

His portrait hangs at Rhodes House, Oxford, besides that of Cecil Rhodes and another Canadian, John MacBain.

He is the subject of biographies by Sir John Willison, "Sir George Parkin: A biography" (London, 1929); William Christian, "Parkin: Canada's most famous forgotten man" (Toronto, 2008), and Terry Cook, "Apostle of empire: Sir George Parkin and imperial federation" (Phd Thesis, Queen's University, Kingston, Ont., 1977).

== Works ==
- Imperial federation, the problem of national unity, London and New York, 1892.
- Round the empire; for the use of schools, London, 1892.
- The great dominion: studies of Canada, London and New York, 1895.
- Edward Thring, headmaster of Uppingham School: life, diary and letters, 2 vols., London and New York, 1898.
- Sir John A. Macdonald, Toronto, 1908.
- The Rhodes scholarships, Toronto, 1912.

== Archives ==
Sir George Parkin's archival fonds is held at Library and Archives Canada. It is archival reference number R5370 and former archival reference number MG30-D44. The fonds consists of 10.85 metres of textual records and a small amount of photographs and other media.
