= Rideau Cottage =

House in Ottawa, Ontario, Canada

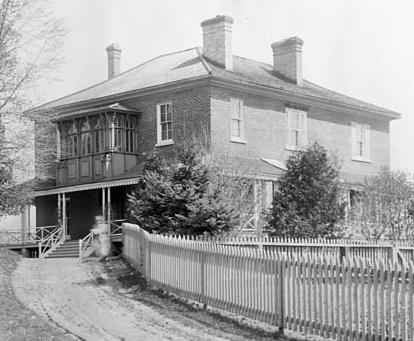
- Rideau Cottage in 1892
- Interactive map of the Rideau Cottage area

General information
- Architectural style: Georgian Revival
- Location: 1 Sussex Drive (on grounds of Rideau Hall), Ottawa, Ontario, Canada
- Coordinates: 45.443692°N 75.682738°W
- Current tenants: Mark Carney, Prime Minister of Canada and his family
- Construction started: 1866
- Completed: 1867
- Cost: $5,000 (1867)
- Owner: The King in Right of Canada
- Landlord: National Capital Commission

Technical details
- Size: 932 square metres (10,030 sq ft)

Other information
- Number of rooms: 22

Rideau Cottage is a historic residential building located on the grounds of Rideau Hall in Ottawa, Ontario. The two-level, 22-room Georgian Revival home is owned by the Canadian Crown and has traditionally been inhabited by people associated with the governor general of Canada, including the viceroy's private secretary.

Due to the poor condition of 24 Sussex Drive, the historical residence of the prime minister of Canada and their family, Rideau Cottage has served as the prime minister's temporary residence since 2015.

== History ==
Construction on the building, which was based on a design by architect F. P. Rubidge, began in 1866 and concluded in 1867. Though intended in the early days to serve as the residence of the governor general's secretary, the cottage was later designated for use by the government as an official guest house for visiting dignitaries.

On his arrival in Canada in 1883, incoming governor general the Marquess of Lansdowne resided at Rideau Cottage while waiting for Rideau Hall to be vacated by the outgoing governor general, the Marquess of Lorne. Other residents included: Lionel and Lilias Massey during Vincent Massey's time as governor general; Georges Vanier, as Aide-de-camp to Governor General Byng; Barbara Uteck, private secretary to the governor general from 2000 to 2006, and her husband, Graham Fraser. Uteck's successor Sheila-Marie Cook resided at Rideau Cottage from 2006 until January 31, 2011. The house was then occupied by private secretary Stephen Wallace, until he vacated the premises in October 2015.

Prime Minister Justin Trudeau and his family occupied the cottage for the duration of his tenure, from November 2015 to March 2025, since the prime minister's official residence at 24 Sussex Drive had been closed for assessment and restoration. However, Rideau Cottage was never ideal as a residence for the prime minister. It lacks the space, grandeur and security infrastructure typically required of an official residence (for instance, meals are prepared off-site).

== Design ==
Rideau Cottage is a two-level, 22-room Georgian Revival building. The structure originally had 14 rooms on a single floor. An 1872 remodel, using different brick, added the second floor and a verandah on three sides of the ground floor. The exterior brick of the first floor was covered in stucco painted to appear like brick, which remained when the verandah was removed some time later. Between 1999 and 2000, the building underwent major renovations to the basement, roof and interior finishes, and the mechanical and electrical systems were upgraded. Outside, the stucco was removed and each brick and joint was individually dyed to give a uniform appearance. It was renovated again in 2013.

Rideau Cottage is characterized and distinguished by its symmetry, simple lines, classically-inspired central entrance with pedimented porch, sash windows flanked by decorative shutters, and paired chimneys.

Rideau Cottage was designated a Recognized Federal Heritage Building on 3 October 1986.

Location of Rideau Cottage on the grounds of Rideau Hall
