= T. Franklin Ahearn =

Canadian businessman and politician

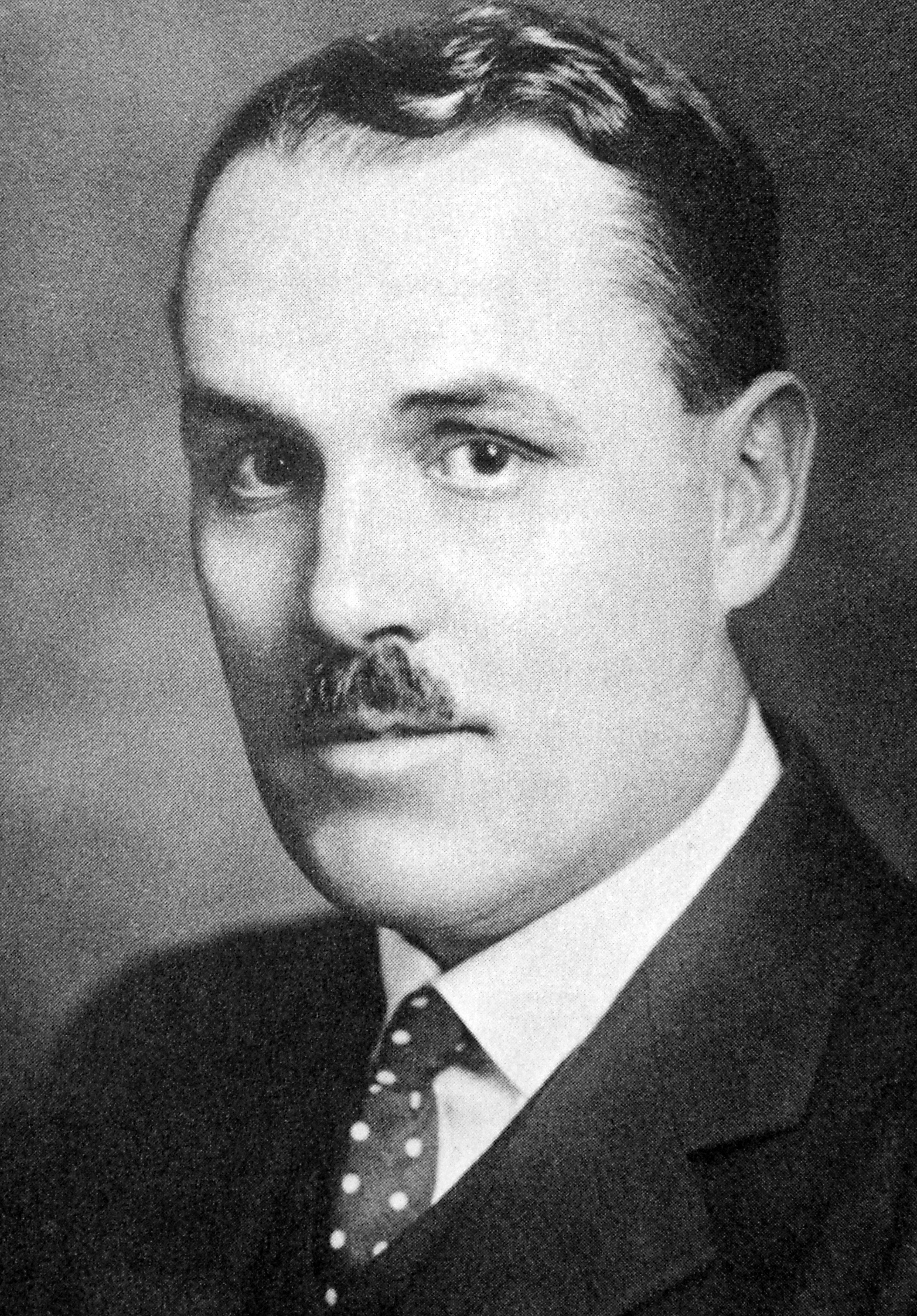
- 1927 portrait
- Born: May 10, 1886; Ottawa, Ontario, Canada
- Died: November 7, 1962 (aged 76); Ottawa, Ontario, Canada
- Occupations: Businessman, politician
- Known for: Ownership of original Ottawa Senators
- Spouse: Norah Lewis (m. 1909)
- Children: 3, including Lilias Massey
- Parent(s): Thomas Ahearn and Lilias Fleck

Thomas Franklin "Frank" Ahearn (May 10, 1886 – November 7, 1962) was a Canadian businessman and politician. Ahearn is best known as an owner of the original Ottawa Senators National Hockey League (NHL) hockey club and a Canadian Member of Parliament.

== Life and career ==
Ahearn was born in Ottawa, Ontario, Canada, the son of Thomas Ahearn and Lilias MacKay Fleck. His father was a prominent Ottawa citizen who owned Ottawa Electric and the Ottawa Electric Railway Company. He was educated at Kent Street Public School, Ottawa Collegiate and privately tutored. Around 1900, he organized the Buena Vista hockey team which played on an open-air rink at Laurier Avenue and Bronson, with an old streetcar for dressing facilities. In 1909, he married Norah Lewis, granddaughter of Archbishop John Travers Lewis and also of Sir Collingwood Schreiber.

Thomas Franklin Ahearn served in World War I, as a captain in the Canadian Expeditionary Force, from 1914 until 1916, when he was injured and returned home.

Mr. Ahearn became involved with the Ottawa Senators in the period when they won three Stanley Cups in four years between 1920 and 1923. In 1924, he bought out majority owner Tommy Gorman. In 1926-27, the Senators won the Cup with one of the most impressive rosters ever assembled. This imposing collection included Jack Adams, King Clancy, Alec Connell, Cy Denneny, Frank Finnigan, Hec Kilrea, Frank Nighbor and Hooley Smith.

Winning the Stanley Cup was the last hurrah for the franchise. Due to a combination of the Great Depression and the smaller population of Ottawa, the club lost money every year after, leading the club to suspend operations for one year, move home games to other cities, and finally move to Missouri to operate as the St. Louis Eagles, and operated the Senators as an amateur/semi-professional senior club. After one season in St. Louis, the Ottawa owners sought to suspend operations again and were turned down by the league. Finally, on October 15, 1935, the Eagles and their players were bought out by the NHL, dispersing the players to other NHL teams and suspending the franchise, with a promise to pass along the proceeds if the franchise was resold. (The franchise would be reinstated eventually in 1992) In the years of his owning the Ottawa Senators, his losses were over $200,000, a loss he said he never regretted. At the time of the dissolution of the NHL franchise, Ahearn was a minority owner of the consortium which owned the Ottawa Auditorium arena and the Senators.

Like his father, Ahearn was involved in politics, and was elected to the House of Commons of Canada in 1930 and 1935.

Ahearn was a vice-president of the Ottawa Light, Heat and Power Company. In 1940, he resigned to become president of the Ottawa Electric Company. He also had his own firm, Rowatt-Ahearn Ltd. and became president of the Ottawa Electric Railway Company in 1938 after his father died. Ahearn also had interests in several other Ottawa businesses including Wallace Realty Company, the Ottawa Car Manufacturing Company, the Ottawa Gas Company, the Ottawa Investment Company, Ahearn & Soper and other businesses.

He was elected to the Hockey Hall of Fame in 1962 as a builder. He was inducted into the Ottawa Sports Hall of Fame in 1966.

Ahearn died in 1962 at his home at 7 Rideau Gate, Ottawa, and was interred in Beechwood Cemetery. He was survived by his wife Norah, son Thomas Travers Ahearn, and daughters Joan and Lilias.

Parliament of Canada
Preceded by Gordon Cameron Edwards	Member of Parliament for Ottawa (City of); 1930–1935	Succeeded by Electoral district was abolished
Preceded by None	Member of Parliament for Ottawa West; 1935–1940	Succeeded by George J. McIlraith
