= Alice Massey =

Canadian philanthropist (1879–1950)

Alice Parkin Massey
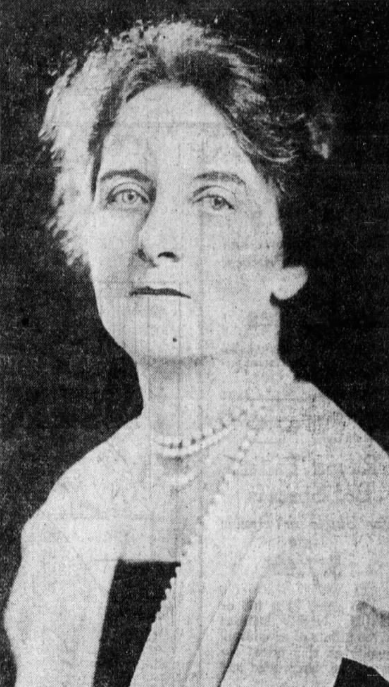
- Massey (c. 1927)
- Born: Alice Parkin; July 1, 1879; Fredericton, New Brunswick, Canada
- Died: July 29, 1950 (aged 71); Port Hope, Ontario, Canada
- Spouse: Vincent Massey (m. 1915)
- Children: Lionel Massey; Hart Parkin Vincent Massey II
- Father: George Robert Parkin
- Relatives: Michael Ignatieff (great-nephew)

Alice Parkin Massey (1 July 1879 – 29 July 1950) was a Canadian philanthropist and the wife of Vincent Massey, who became Governor General of Canada shortly after her death.

== Early life and education ==
Born in Fredericton, New Brunswick, she was the daughter of educator George Robert Parkin and Annie Connell Fisher Parkin. She was educated in Canada, England and Switzerland. In 1914, she was appointed head of the women's students hostel at the University of Toronto. She married Vincent Massey the following year.

== Public career ==
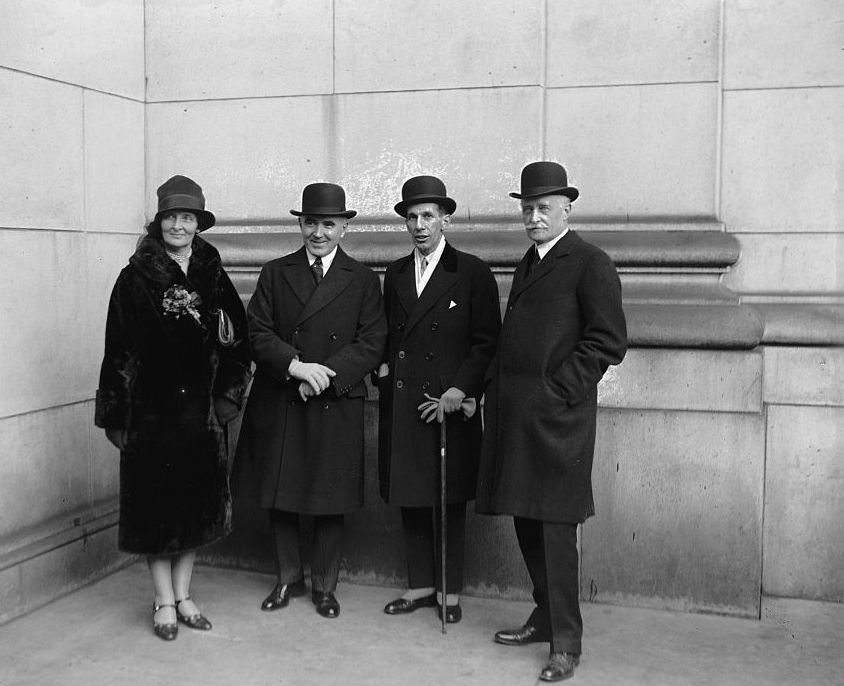
Alice Massey with Timothy Smiddy, Vincent Massey, and Sir Esme Howard in 1927

During Vincent Massey's term as High Commissioner for Canada in the United Kingdom, Alice became involved in organizations to assist Canadian service personnel in England during World War II, including a medical hospice for injured Canadian servicemen, the Canadian Officers' Club and the Montreal-based Beaver Club. Alice Massey also served as a member of the St. John Ambulance Brigade through World War II and would maintain her connection with St. John Ambulance until her death.

== Personal life ==
Alice and Vincent Massey had two children, Lionel (1916–1965) and Hart (1918–1996). Alice Massey died in Port Hope, Ontario on 29 July 1950, aged 71. Due to Alice's death, Lionel Massey's wife Lilias served as chatelaine of Rideau Hall. Writer and politician Michael Ignatieff is Massey's great-nephew.
