= Vincent Massey =

Governor General of Canada from 1952 to 1959

The Right Honourable Vincent Massey PC CH CC CD FRSC(hon) (Note: In Massey's Order of Canada citation on the website of the Governor General of Canada, his post-nominal letters are listed as: PC, CH, CC. Massey was, however, entitled to far more letters; his 1948 autobiography On Being Canadian lists him as: CH, DCL, LLD(hon), FRSC. The Department of Veterans Affairs page on the Canadian Forces' Decoration mentions that Massey was the first governor general to be awarded the medal upon taking office, which entitled him to utilize the post-nominal letters CD. The same page lists him as "The Right Honourable Vincent Massey, CC CH GCJ CD", although this listing is inconsistent with the accepted Canadian/Commonwealth Order of precedence.)
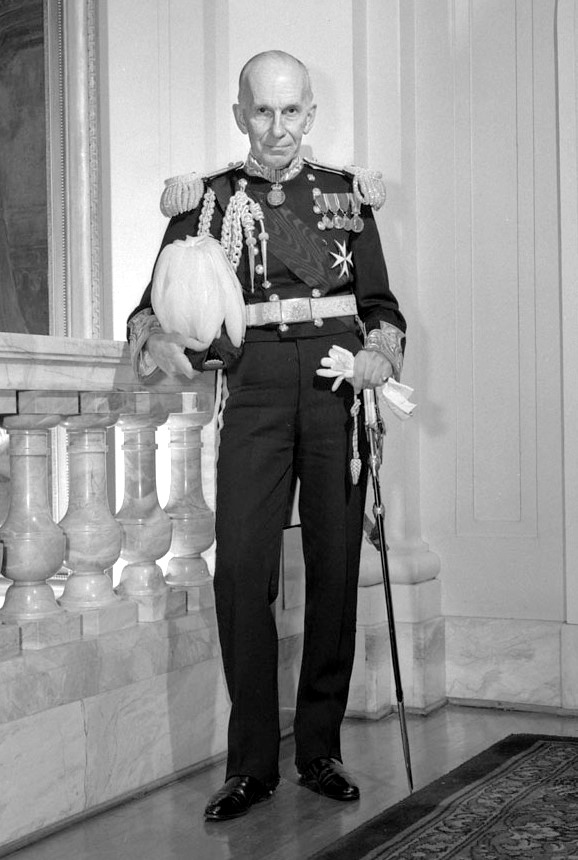
- Massey, c. 1956

18th Governor General of Canada
- In office February 28, 1952 – September 15, 1959
- Monarch: Elizabeth II
- Prime Minister: Louis St. Laurent; John Diefenbaker
- Preceded by: The Viscount Alexander of Tunis
- Succeeded by: Georges Vanier

20th Chancellor of the University of Toronto
- In office 1947–1953
- President: Sidney Earle Smith
- Preceded by: Henry John Cody
- Succeeded by: Samuel Beatty

7th High Commissioner of Canada to the United Kingdom
- In office 1935–1946
- Prime Minister: William Lyon Mackenzie King
- Preceded by: Howard Ferguson
- Succeeded by: Norman Robertson

1st Envoy Extraordinary of Canada to the United States
- In office November 25, 1926 – July 23, 1930
- Prime Minister: William Lyon Mackenzie King
- Preceded by: Position established
- Succeeded by: William Duncan Herridge

Personal details
- Born: Charles Vincent Massey; February 20, 1887 Toronto, Ontario, Canada
- Died: December 30, 1967 (aged 80) London, England
- Spouse: Alice Massey (m. 1915; died 1950)
- Children: Lionel Massey; Hart Parkin Vincent Massey II
- Relatives: Raymond Massey (brother); Daniel Massey (nephew); Anna Massey (niece)
- Education: University College, Toronto; Balliol College, Oxford
- Profession: Diplomat

Military service
- Allegiance: Non-Permanent Active Militia
- Years of service: 1907 - 1915
- Rank: Lieutenant; Captain
- Unit: Queen's Own Rifles (1907-14); University of Toronto Officer Corps (1915)
- Battles/wars: First World War

Charles Vincent Massey (February 20, 1887 – December 30, 1967) was a Canadian diplomat and statesman who served as the 18th governor general of Canada from 1952 to 1959. Massey was the first governor general of Canada to be born in Canada.

Massey was born into an influential Toronto family and was educated in Ontario and England, obtaining a degree in history and befriending future prime minister William Lyon Mackenzie King while studying at the University of Oxford. He was commissioned into the military in 1917 for the remainder of the First World War and, after a brief stint in the Canadian Cabinet, began his diplomatic career, serving in envoys to the United States and United Kingdom. Upon his return to Canada in 1946, Massey headed a royal commission on the arts between 1949 and 1951, which resulted in the Massey Report and subsequently the establishment of the National Library of Canada and the Canada Council of the Arts, among other grant-giving agencies. In 1952 he was appointed Governor General by King George VI on the recommendation of Prime Minister Louis St. Laurent, to replace the Viscount Alexander of Tunis as viceroy, and he occupied the post until succeeded by Georges Vanier in 1959.

On September 16, 1925, Massey was sworn into the King's Privy Council for Canada, giving him the accordant style of The Honourable. However, Massey was later, as a former Governor General of Canada, entitled to be styled for life with the superior form of The Right Honourable. He subsequently continued his philanthropic work and founded Massey College at the University of Toronto and the Massey Lectures before he died on December 30, 1967.

== Early life, education, and career ==
Massey was born in Toronto, Ontario, to Anna (née Vincent) and Chester Daniel Massey, the owner of the Massey-Harris Co. (predecessor to Massey Ferguson) and the patriarch of one of the city's wealthiest families. His brother was Canadian-American actor Raymond Massey. The Massey family, of English origin, had immigrated from Cheshire, England, to the Massachusetts Bay Colony in 1630. The clan was strongly Methodist and played an important role in supporting local religious, cultural, and educational organizations, including Victoria University, Massey Hall, and the Metropolitan Methodist Church (now the Metropolitan United Church). Massey was thus raised among Toronto's elite, which gave him a number of social and familial connections throughout his life. However, despite their status as one of Toronto's richest families, the Methodist Masseys were not considered to be one of the FOOFs (Fine Old Ontario Families), the slightly disparaging term used to describe the clique of wealthy Anglican families of English and Loyalist descent who dominated the social life of Toronto from the late 18th century well into the 20th century. To compensate for their parvenus status, Massey together with other members of his family were much given to philanthropy.

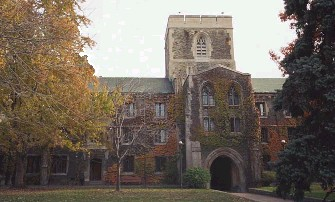
The Gate House of Burwash Hall, a residence of Victoria College donated by Massey's father, and where Massey served as the first Dean of Men

Massey was raised in the family mansion at 519 Jarvis Street and educated at St. Andrew's College from 1902 to 1906, then at University College at the University of Toronto, despite his family's close ties to Victoria College. At the University of Toronto, he enlisted in The Queen's Own Rifles of Canada in 1907 and joined the Kappa Alpha Society, through which he met future prime minister William Lyon Mackenzie King, who would be his long-time friend. After passing matriculation three years later with his Bachelor of Arts degree in history and English, Massey continued his education at Balliol College at the University of Oxford, where he graduated with a second in modern history in 1913.

In 1911, thinking that the University of Toronto lacked a facility where its 4,000 students could engage in extracurricular activities, Massey donated $16,290 to the students' fund to build a student centre and thereafter led the endowment and construction efforts. In 1913, he returned to Toronto and became the first Dean of Men at Burwash Hall, the residence recently donated to Victoria University by his father. He also served as a lecturer on modern history at the college. When Canada entered the First World War in 1914, Massey was commissioned as an officer for Military District No. 2 and was called to work for the Cabinet war committee. On June 4, 1915, Massey married Alice Parkin, the daughter of Sir George Robert Parkin, who was a former principal of Upper Canada College (UCC) and secretary of the Rhodes Trust; through the marriage, Massey later became the uncle of George Grant and the great-uncle of Michael Ignatieff. Within a few years, Vincent and Alice had two sons, Lionel Massey (1916–1965) and Hart Parkin Vincent Massey II (1918–1996; a WWII Spitfire pilot who flew with John Gillespie Magee, author of "High Flight"). Massey was discharged at the cessation of hostilities in 1918.

In 1921, Massey became president of his father's business, Massey-Harris Co. He also pursued philanthropic interests, mostly in arts and education, such as his collection of paintings and sculpture through his Massey Foundation, which he established in 1918. By the next year, University of Toronto's social and athletic facility was completed and dedicated to the memory of Massey's grandfather, Hart Massey, as Hart House; there, Massey participated as an amateur actor and director in the building's theatre.

== Political career ==
In 1925, finding himself unsuited to corporate life, he resigned from Massey-Harris. Later that year, on September 16, he was appointed to the King's Privy Council by Governor General the Viscount Byng of Vimy, and was also made a minister without portfolio in Mackenzie King's Cabinet. He ran for the House of Commons in the riding of Durham in the 1925 federal election, but was defeated Though he thereafter resigned his cabinet post, Massey was still included in the Canadian delegation to the 1926 Imperial Conference, where was drafted the Balfour Declaration that would ultimately lead to vast constitutional changes in the role of the monarch and his viceroys throughout the empire.

In 1932, Massey became the first president of the newly formed National Liberal Federation of Canada, before which the Liberal Party was a loose and informal association of national, provincial, and regional entities without a permanent central organization. In the 1935 federal election, the Liberals returned to office with a majority and Mackenzie King was once again prime minister. Massey managed the Liberal campaign in the 1935 election. In his last year in office, Bennett had swung sharply to the left, passing a set of bills known as "Bennett's New Deal" that were modelled after the New Deal in the United States that sought to increase state involvement in the Canadian economy. In the 1935 election, to make up for Mackenzie King's lack of charisma who was additionally a poor speaker and whose views on the issues were inscrutable, Massey sought to portray Mackenzie King as a steady, competent, experienced leader who could best manage the Great Depression. Massey coined the election slogan "It's either King or Chaos!", portraying Bennett as an erratic leader whose judgement could not be trusted, unlike Mackenzie King.

Massey would have preferred to return to politics, not the least because he thought he would make a better prime minister than Mackenzie King, whose muddled politics Massey privately held in contempt, but he accepted a diplomatic career as a consolation prize. Massey believed that Canada was a British nation in North America that also had a French infusion and that the essence of being a Canadian was to adopt primarily British traditions to a North American settling. Reflecting his Anglophilia, Massey quite consciously sought to model his mannerisms after those of an upper-class "English gentleman", which limited his political appeal as it led to accusations of snobbery. Massey's style of convoying a "tranquil consciousness of effortless superiority" that he picked up during his time at Oxford annoyed many Canadians, most notably his patron Mackenzie King, who decided that being a high commissioner to Britain would be the best place for him.

Massey advocated excluding Jews from immigrating to Canada while Jewish refugees were fleeing Europe. He believed Jews were likely Communists and would steal jobs from native-born Canadians.

== Diplomatic career ==
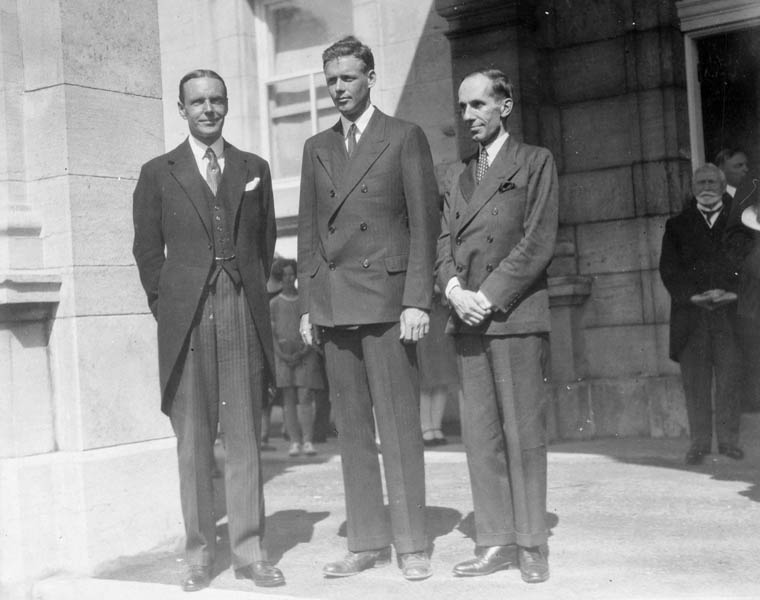
Massey (right), William Phillips (left), and Charles Lindbergh outside Rideau Hall in July 1927

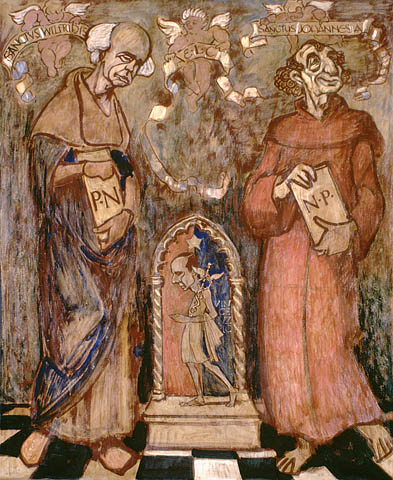
A satirical cartoon created by J. E. H. MacDonald to mark the appointment of Massey as Canadian minister to the United States, and presented to Massey on February 5, 1927 (Note: Massey is depicted (centre) as Mercury bearing his caduceus, a symbol of peace and commerce. To either side of Massey are two former prime ministers of Canada; at left, Wilfrid Laurier, and right, John A. Macdonald. Each holds a tablet, Laurier's inscribed with the letters P.N., and Macdonald's with N.P., standing for, respectively, Politique national and National Policy.)

Later in 1926, on November 25, Governor General the Marquess of Willingdon acted on Mackenzie King's advice to appoint Massey as the first Canadian Envoy Extraordinary and Minister Plenipotentiary to the United States for His Majesty's Government in Canada, making Massey Canada's first ever envoy with full diplomatic credentials to a foreign capital. (Note: The government of Canada had sent ministers and other diplomats abroad since the end of the 19th century; for example, the first High Commissioner to the United Kingdom was dispatched on May 11, 1880, and the credentials of the first Canadian mission to the United States were received on November 7, 1918. However, governmental capitals within the British Empire and later the Commonwealth of Nations were not considered foreign, and Canadian diplomats received by foreign governments were not considered of a diplomatic rank above chargé d'affaires.) Massey returned to Canada in 1930, as Mackenzie King had put his name forward for appointment as High Commissioner to the United Kingdom. However, five days after Massey relinquished his post in Washington, DC, Mackenzie King's Liberal Party was defeated in the federal election, and Richard Bennett became prime minister. Bennett objected to Massey as the government's representative to the UK on the grounds that, as a former Liberal Cabinet member, Massey did not enjoy the political confidence of the new Conservative government that was needed by the individual occupying the position.

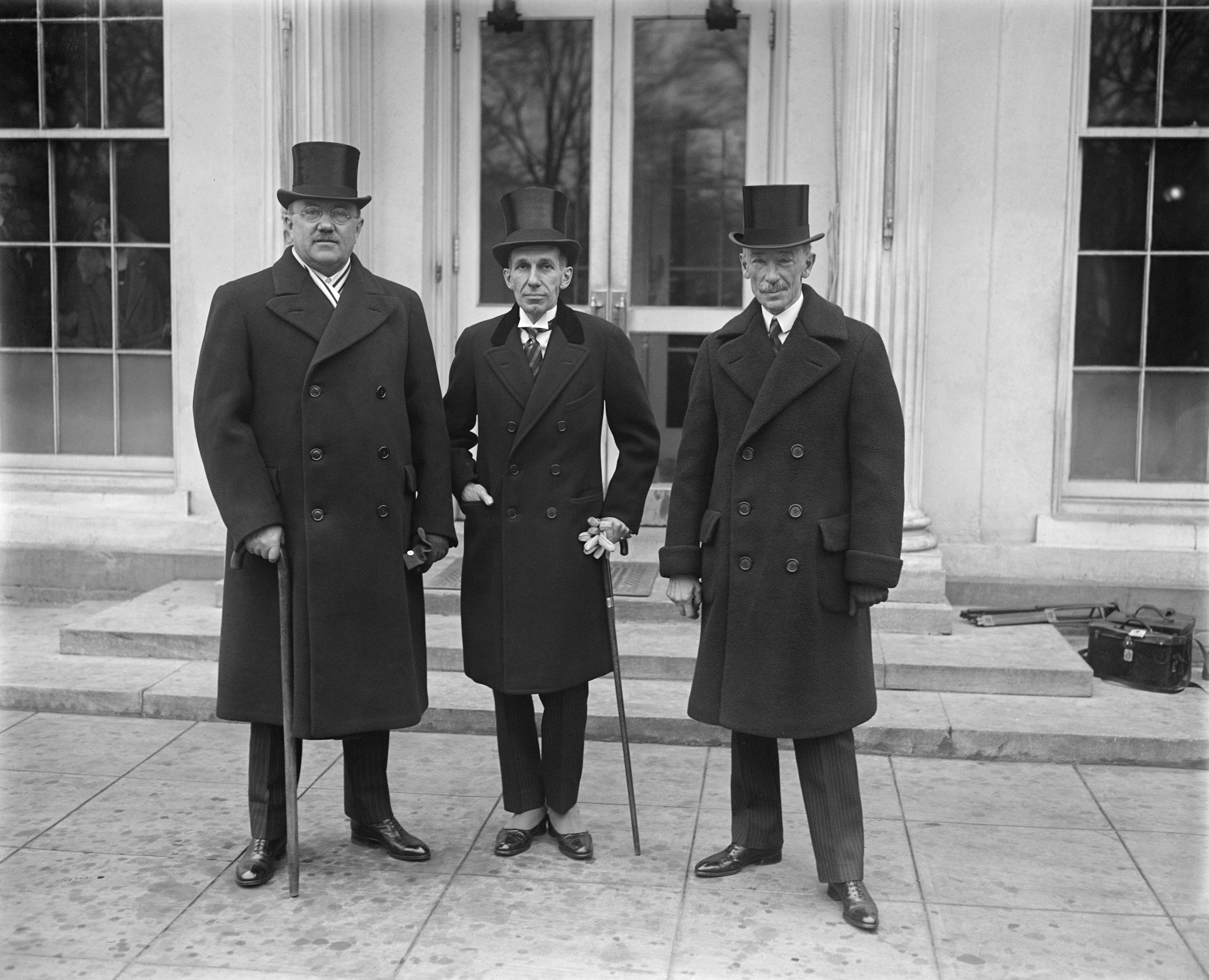
Justice Minister Ernest Lapointe with Canadian Ambassador to the United States Vincent Massey, and Quebec Premier Louis-Alexandre Taschereau at the White House in 1928

== High Commissioner in London ==
On November 8, 1935, Massey was appointed the High Commissioner to the United Kingdom for His Majesty's Government in Canada and arrived at Canada House to find as his secretary the man who would be his successor as Governor General of Canada, Georges Vanier. The two men set about regular diplomatic business, but, throughout 1936, Massey had to contend with the death of King George V and the accession and then the abdication of King Edward VIII in favour of his younger brother, Prince Albert, Duke of York, who ascended the throne as George VI. Massey was a passionate Anglophile for whom Britain was his ideal, and he had long wanted to be the Canadian high commissioner in London. Through the Massey family were American in origin, having arrived in Upper Canada in 1802, he invariably failed to mention that in his speeches, instead giving the very misleading impression that the Massey family–who had originated in Cheshire and immigrated to New England in the 17th century- had instead gone directly from England to Canada.

During the abdication crisis of 1936, Massey supported the prime minister Stanley Baldwin against King Edward VIII, sharing the prime minister's viewpoint that it was not acceptable for the king and the supreme governor of the Church of England to marry a twice-divorced American woman, Wallis Simpson. Massey told Baldwin that he had his full support in his demand that the king either give up his throne or Simpson, though he also advised Baldwin that the king was popular in Canada, and many Canadians would not understand why the king could not marry Simpson, saying the matter had to be handled very carefully least it alienate the Canadian people from the monarchy. The abdication crisis cemented Massey's dislike of the man who rapidly become his least favorite British politician, Winston Churchill, who supported the king's right to keep his throne and marry Mrs. Simpson. Massey in his reports to Mackenzie King (who acted as his own External Affairs minister) described Churchill as a reckless adventurer who was "exploiting the crisis for his own political ends". Massey believed that Churchill was using the crisis together with the "press barons" Lord Beaverbrook and Lord Rothermere to start a popular movement aimed at deposing Baldwin as Conservative Party leader in order to make himself prime minister. When Churchill gave a speech in the favour of the king in the House of Commons, Massey approvingly reported he was shouted down as Churchill had "shown his irresponsible, free-booting disposition". In May 1937, Massey was greatly honoured to have taken part in the coronation of King George VI, where he served as one of the royal standard-bearers. Massey held an intense reverence for the monarchy that bordered on the religious as he wrote: "What follows defies all adjectives. No ceremonial could be finer or more moving-this country has a genius for such things because of the combination of essentially English qualities of which English pageantry is an expression, a romantic sense, a feeling for precision without rigidity, a sense of symbolism kept in close check by a sense of humor, a practical sense which relates the ceremonial to present-day reality. Pageantry in the English tradition has always stood for pageantry with intelligence and feeling". The only element that marred the coronation for him was Mackenzie King's order that Massey not wear knee breeches as anachronistic, an order he unhappily complied with. Massey privately complained: "I wish to goodness that some of my countrymen wouldn't have an almost religious antipathy to knee breeches". Massey was dressed in his best clothes for the coronation and was described as looking "like a medieval strained glass window".

Starting in May 1936, weekly meetings started to be held at Massey's house attended by all of the Dominion high commissioners in London to discuss matters of common concern. Massey together with Stanley Bruce of Australia and Charles te Water of South Africa were considered to be the "big three" of the Dominion high commissioners as Australia, South Africa, and Canada were viewed as the three most powerful Dominions. However, both Bruce and te Water were held in far higher esteem by the British than Massey, who was felt to be an embarrassment, as he tried too hard to be accepted by the Establishment. Massey cultivated an aristocratic, sophisticated demeanor which gave him a reputation in London as a snob. By contrast, te Water was respected for his intelligence, although disliked for being arrogant and aloof, while Bruce, as appropriate for a former Australian prime minister, was felt to be the most approachable of the high commissioners and had a populist "down-to-earth" demeanour. Bruce was held in a special esteem in London, and his influence was increased by his friendship with Geoffrey Dawson, the editor of The Times. Likewise, both Bruce and te Water had more influence on their respective governments, as both men were friends of their respective prime ministers, namely Joseph Lyons of Australia and J. B. M. Hertzog of South Africa, while Mackenzie King seems to have appointed the Anglophile Massey as high commissioner as a sop to his ego. The mildly Anglophobic Mackenzie King complained that Massey's dispatches to him were "too English" for his liking. Te Water was considered to be the most intelligent and able of all the Dominion high commissioners, and he often acted as their informal leader. The British historian Max Beloff later described the Dominion high commissioners as a close-knit group who worked for appeasement of Germany.

All of the Dominion high commissioners held certain common beliefs that made them into supporters of appeasement. As a group, they believed that the Treaty of Versailles had been too harsh towards Germany, and that it was France rather than Germany that was the principle trouble-maker in Europe. In common with the other high commissioners, Massey believed that the efforts of the Reich to challenge the international order created by the Treaty of Versailles were just and moral, and it was France's efforts to upheld the Versailles system which made the French rather the Germans the main danger to world peace. Alongside this view of European politics went an intense dread of the Soviet Union, which was the nation that Massey and the other high commissioners feared the most. Massey was opposed to the alliances that France signed with Czechoslovakia in 1925 and with the Soviet Union in 1935, seeing this as irresponsible diplomacy on the part of the French, who were attempting to preserve the Versailles system instead of giving in to German demands, as he felt that they should. One of the most important influences on Massey was Lord Lothian, a Scottish aristocrat and a liberal intellectual whose perspective was always more in terms of the British empire than in terms of Britain, a viewpoint that endeared him to Massey. Lord Lothian had become convinced by 1923 that the Treaty of Versailles was a monstrously harsh peace treaty whose terms needed to be revised, and for much of the 1920s and 1930s had been a leading enthusiast for Germany. Lothian visited Germany twice, in 1935 and again in 1937, to meet Adolf Hitler, and in both cases came away impressed. Much of Massey's favourable views about Nazi Germany were due to his talks with Lothian, who assured him that if only the Treaty of Versailles were revised, the peace of the world would be saved. Charles Corbin, the French ambassador to the court of St. James, who met all of the Dominion high commissioners together with all of the Dominion leaders during the Imperial conference of 1937, described them all as a group who were collectively ignorant of Europe, reporting to Paris on June 3, 1937, that he was astonished at how little they knew about Eastern Europe, a region they viewed via very simplistic clichés.

As high commissioner, Massey used his connections to bring to Canada House a host of personalities from "the highest quarters". Two such persons were Viscount and Viscountess Astor, who were the nucleus of the Cliveden set, which itself was a group of aristocratic individuals rumoured to be Germanophiles, not only in favour of the appeasement of Hitler, but also supporters of friendly relations with Nazi Germany. Though these allegations were historically challenged as exaggerations, Irving Abella and Harold Troper claimed in their book None Is Too Many: Canada and the Jews of Europe 1933–1948 that Massey was an enthusiastic supporter of the Munich Agreement and worked in concert with various elected and non-elected people in government, including Mackenzie King and Ernest Lapointe, to put obstacles in the way of Jewish refugees fleeing Europe for Canada, or even using Canada as a stopover en route to some other country. However, Canadian immigration policy at the time favoured trained farmers, which excluded most Jews, who were largely city dwellers, and the Cabinet of Mackenzie King was already resistant to changes in the law. (Note: Massey's viceregal successor, Georges Vanier, while posted as Canadian envoy to numerous European governments in exile and later as the ambassador to France, fought, along with his wife, Pauline Vanier, to see Canada allow in more refugees from the Second World War. Their efforts, however, were ignored by the government of Mackenzie King, and it was not until 1947 that more European refugees were allowed to settle in Canada.) Seven decades later, these accusations against Massey resulted in a campaign in Windsor, Ontario, to rename a high school that had originally been named in his honour.

On April 24, 1938, the Sudetenland crisis began when the Sudeten German leader Konrad Henlein in a speech in Karlsbad (modern Karlovy Vary) put forward the so-called Karlsbad programme, whose eight points would have given the Sudetenland much autonomy within Czechoslovakia. The Karlsbad programme had been written in Berlin, and the German government promptly endorsed the Karlsbad programme, saying it would go to war if Czechoslovakia rejected the Karlsbad programme. In the May crisis of 1938, Massey blamed President Edvard Beneš of Czechoslovakia rather than Hitler, writing in a cable to Mackenzie King that it was Czechoslovakia that was the aggressor and Germany the victim. On May 28, 1938, the British Foreign Secretary Lord Halifax in a meeting with all the Dominion high commissioners told them that the British government was convinced that Czechoslovakia with its mixture of Czechs, Slovaks, Germans, Magyars, Poles and Ukrainians could not last as a unitary state, and the best solution would be to turn Czechoslovakia into a federation. Halifax felt the Karlsbad programme, through problematic in certain respects, offered the starting point to turn Czechoslovakia into a federation. After the meeting, Halifax took Massey aside for a talk, saying he was very interested in learning how English Canadians and French Canadians got along well in the Canadian federation, saying he envisioned a "Canadian solution" to the problems of Czechoslovakia. Halifax told Massey he wanted to see Czechoslovakia turned into a Canadian-style federation so that the Czechs and the Sudeten Germans would act more like English Canadians and French Canadians and less like themselves. The fact that Beneš rejected the British advice to engage in constitutional changes to make Czechoslovakia into a federation until early September 1938 cost him much sympathy in London, and added to the perception that it was Beneš who was the danger to peace.

During the Sudetenland crisis of 1938, Massey very much wanted President Franklin D. Roosevelt of the United States to step in as a mediator, and was disappointed when Prime Minister Neville Chamberlain told him that he did not think much of this plan, saying he much doubted that Roosevelt was willing to play the role of the mediator. Massey saw the Sudetenland crisis as a matter of "saving civilization" as he believed that another world war would be the end of Western civilization. On September 12, 1938, the crisis dramatically escalated when Hitler in his speech at the Nuremberg Party Rally announced that the acceptance of the Karlsbad programme was not enough and instead demanded the Sudetenland "go home to the Reich", saying he now wanted the Sudetenland incorporated into Germany, a demand that President Beneš promptly rejected. The fact that Hitler engaged in much personal abuse of Beneš in his speech was not helpful to peace as Massey reported to Mackenzie King, but he still clung to his belief that it was Beneš who was the problem, not Hitler. Massey believed that Hitler's demands for the Sudetenland were moral and just, that Czechoslovakia was not worth fighting for, and it was France that by refusing to renounce its alliance with Czechoslovakia was the principle trouble-maker. Massey believed that Britain should only go to war if Hitler was seeking world domination, and as he did not believe that this was the case with the Sudetenland, he was opposed to war with Germany in 1938. On September 14, 1938, Massey met with te Water where both men agreed that "this astonishing episode" as they deemed it with Britain on the brink of the war must not be allowed to come to war, and that Britain should pressure Czechoslovakia to cede the Sudetenland. On September 19, 1938, the Dominion secretary Malcolm MacDonald met with all of the Dominion high commissioners to tell them that Chamberlain had agreed to Hitler's demand that the Sudetenland "go home to the Reich" and that Britain would offer a "guarantee" of the rest of Czechoslovakia as the reward for ceding the Sudetenland. Bruce supported the idea of the "guarantee" and even offered to have Australia join in with "guaranteeing" Czechoslovakia; te Water was categorically opposed, saying there was no possibility of South Africa joining in; and Massey in his report to Mackenzie King offered no comment about his feelings other than to say the other high commissioners had insisted upon it. Massey added that he still felt that Beneš was the main danger to the peace, saying his main fear was that Beneš might reject the British peace plan. Much to Massey's relief, Beneš accepted the British plan.

On September 24, 1938, all of the Dominion high commissioners met with MacDonald. As was usually the case, te Water acted as their spokesman and he sharply criticised Chamberlain for rejecting Hitler's Bad Godesberg ultimatum, saying that Chamberlain should try to modify Hitler's terms, but if matters came to in extremis, it was better to yield to Hitler's terms than go to war. Shortly afterwards, a split emerged with the Dominion high commissioners with Bruce arguing that Chamberlain was correct after all to reject the Bad Godesberg ultimatum, saying it was a matter of British "honour" that the United Kingdom not be allowed to be seen to be bullied, and that a referendum should be held in the Sudetenland to determine what districts wanted to "go home to the Reich" and what districts wanted to remain part of Czechoslovakia. By contrast, Massey, te Water and the Irish high commissioner John Dulanty all supported accepting Hitler's demand that the Reich be allowed to occupy the Sudetenland prior to October 1, 1938. On September 28, 1938, both Bruce and Massey supported te Water's statement that it was "psychologically wrong" to blame Hitler for the crisis and with te Water's demand that Chamberlain find a way to silence the "bellicose" MPs like Winston Churchill who were criticizing his government's policies in the House of Commons. At another meeting with MacDonald on September 29, both te Water and Massey protested against the British appeal to Beneš to "not tie" Chamberlain's hands, complaining that it implied that Beneš had the power to do so. When Chamberlain left Heston airport to attend the Munich conference on September 29, 1938, both te Water and Massey were there to offer him their best wishes to save the peace at Munich.

In March 1939, Europe was plunged into a new crisis, this time concerning the city-state of the Free City of Danzig (modern Gdańsk, Poland) as Hitler now announced that he wanted the Free City to "go home to the Reich", a demand that was felt certain to cause a war with Poland, which had certain rights in Danzig and always taken the position that any attempt to return to Danzig to Germany would be a casus belli. Massey was greatly influenced by te Water, and usually followed whatever line te Water was taking with regard to the British. Following the German occupation of the Czech half of Czecho-Slovakia on March 15, 1939, the policy of the Chamberlain government notably altered. In a speech in Birmingham on March 17, 1939, Chamberlain announced that if Hitler was seeking world domination, Britain would go to war. At a meeting with the Dominions Secretary Sir Thomas Inskip, te Water, supported by Massey, assailed the change of policy, saying that Germany still deserved "one more chance of saving face". On March 31, 1939, Chamberlain in a speech in the House of Commons announced the famous British "guarantee" of Poland, stating that Britain would go to war to defend Polish independence, through Chamberlain notably left out Polish territory from the "guarantee", thereby implying that Britain was still open to having the Polish corridor and Upper Silesia returned to Germany. Later that same day in a meeting at 10 Downing Street, te Water and Massey both told Chamberlain that Germany "had a genuine claim to Danzig", which made it an "extremely bad reason" to risk a war over.

For Massey, his main concern in the spring of 1939 was not the Danzig visit, but rather organizing the royal visit of King George VI and Queen Elizabeth to Canada, which took place in June–July 1939. Massey had been planning the visit ever since the coronation, and spent much time corresponding with the Governor-General, Lord Tweedsmuir about the preparations for the visit, as the impeding royal visit had less interest for Mackenzie King. Much to Massey's delight, he found himself regularly having dinner with the royal family at Windsor Castle to discuss details for the visit. The royal visit was a great success with the king being cheered whatever he went as he visited all nine provinces, leading Massey to write: "The Royal visit to Canada was an event so happy in its conception, so gloriously successful in its achievement, and so fragrant in its memory, that any comment seems both inadequate and superfluous".

Over the course of the summer of 1939, Massey came to break away from te Water's influence, helped by the fact that te Water had taken a holiday in Ireland for much of the summer. Through Massey was not enthusiastic about the possibility of Britain going to war, he came to increasingly accept that it might be inevitable unless Hitler could be persuaded to back down in the Danzig crisis. An additional pressure for a change in views came from Lord Lothian, who had a volte-face in his thinking about Nazi Germany, and was by the spring of 1939 was now convinced that Hitler was seeking world domination. Over the course of the summer of 1939, Lothian sought to convince Massey that Hitler's aims went beyond revising the Treaty of Versailles towards the domination of the entire world, an effort that Lothian was successful in.

== Second World War ==
Nevertheless, Massey was a Canadian and British patriot and worked not only to maximize Canada's war effort once the Second World War broke out, but also served through 1936 as the Canadian delegate to the League of Nations, between 1941 and 1945 as a trustee of the National and Tate galleries, and as chair of the Tate's board of governors from 1943 to 1945. For this work Massey was inducted by George VI into the Order of the Companions of Honour in 1946. After Britain declared war on September 3, 1939, the high commissioners set themselves up as a "junior war cabinet" that represented their interests with the British government. As Charles te Water was fired on September 7, 1939, for opposing South Africa's entry into the war, Bruce and Massey were regarded as the co-leaders of the high commissioners. In a reversal of the expected roles, the New Zealand high commissioner Bill Jordan, a working class British man and a former London policeman who had immigrated to New Zealand in 1904 was the high commissioner best liked by the British, followed up by Bruce. Massey with his aristocratic airs was considered to be a pompous snob who was too overtly proud of the fact that the Masseys were one of Canada's richest families.

In September 1939, Massey and Bruce met with the Dominions Secretary, Anthony Eden, to suggest a plan to train airmen in Canada and Australia, which became the genesis of the British Commonwealth Air Training Plan. Massey always regarded his work as in helping to create the British Commonwealth Air Training Plan as one of his great achievements. However, Massey was undercut by Mackenzie King who in an extraordinary move told the British not to regard Massey as speaking for Canada, leaving the British confused about what was the precise purpose of Massey's role in London. Mackenzie King had only very reluctantly declared war on Germany on September 10, 1939, and was keen to minimize Canada's role in the war, wanting Canada to do as little as possible, as he feared a repeat of the conscription crisis of 1917. Once the war began, the deeply Anglophile Massey wanted Canada to do as much as possible to help the "mother country", leading Mackenzie King to marginalize him as Massey's views about Canada's role in the war were not his views. Massey welcomed the appointment of Churchill as prime minister on May 10, 1940, by King George VI, though he never lost his doubts about the fitness of Churchill to be prime minister, regarding him as an adventurer with a questionable sense of judgement. In late May 1940, Massey informed the British that Canada was sending all of the Royal Canadian Navy's destroyers to Britain to assist with the defense of Britain if France surrendered.

In 1940, Massey together with Bruce were extremely unhappy when Churchill appointed Inskip as the dominions secretary to replace Eden, telling the new South African high commissioner Sidney Frank Waterson that Inskip was one of the most incompetent ministers in the Chamberlain cabinet who had once fallen asleep during a crucial cabinet meeting in April 1939. Both Massey and Bruce regarded the appointment of Inskip as dominions secretary as a personal insult, saying that this showed how little Churchill valued the dominions. The fact that Inskip was not allowed to attend the meetings of the War Cabinet, and thus would not be able to inform the high commissioners of the decisions of the war cabinet added to Massey's rancor, which he expressed in a letter to Churchill on July 3, 1940. It was only with appointment of Lord Cranborne as Dominions Secretary in 1943 that Massey finally felt there was a competent Dominions Secretary who understood the concerns of the dominions. In July 1940, Massey supported a declaration of proposed British war aims written by Bruce which stated that "we make it abundantly clear that we stand not only for liberty, but for economic and social justice" because that would "give us every chance of mobilising a revolutionary movement in Europe behind the ideals of the British empire".

Massey was opposed to Britain taking a hardline with Vichy France, as he believed that Marshal Philippe Pétain had only signed the armistice with Germany on June 21, 1940, to save his nation and that Pétain could be persuaded to reenter the war on the Allied side, provided the British were tactful with him. By contrast, Massey had nothing but contempt for the French National Committee in London headed by Charles de Gaulle, a man whom Massey detested and distrusted. Massey's views towards Vichy France were to a certain extent governed by domestic considerations as Pétain's révolution nationale was popular with Catholic conservatives in Quebec, and Massey feared that British actions such as attacking the French fleet at Mers-el-Kébir would increase anti-war feelings in Quebec. During the London blitz, Massey lived in the Dorchester hotel, where he felt he would be safer from German bombs. Massey was strongly opposed to the Destroyers-for-bases deal, under which Britain gave the United States 99-year leases on various British air and naval bases in the British West Indies, British Guiana (modern Guyana), Bermuda and Newfoundland in exchange for 50 elderly American destroyers, some of which were barely seaworthy. Massey was especially opposed to the United States taking over naval and air bases in Newfoundland, which he viewed as a future Canadian province. Massey felt that the American bases in Newfoundland were the first step towards the United States annexing Newfoundland, and in March 1941 delivered a formal note of protest, saying that Churchill signed the Destroyers-for-bases deal without consulting Canada.

From 1942 onward, Massey was involved in a semi-military extension of his duties, representing the interests of the Canadian military headquarters in London, in which capacity, he worked very closely with J. L. Ralston, the minister of national defense; General Andrew McNaughton, the commander of the First Canadian Army; and his deputy General Harry Crerar. Massey was closer to Crerar than to McNaughton, with whom he had difficult relations, and increasingly came to share Crerar's conviction that McNaughton in a classic case of the Peter principle had been promoted to his level of incompetence. McNaughton had earned a sterling reputation in the First World War as one of the outstanding "gunners" (artillerymen) in the entire world, and still famous in Second World War as the great Canadian soldier-scientist, a man who had mastered two very different fields. The fact that McNaughton was highly charismatic and very popular with the Canadian people also added to his appeal. However, Crerar felt and Massey came to feel likewise that whatever McNaughton's gifts as a "gunner" that was not capable of commanding an army in the field. Massey seems to have missed that Crerar was an intriguer who was always plotting to secure himself a promotion, and that at least part of his animosity against McNaughton was his desire to command the First Canadian Army. Lester Pearson during a visit to London reported that McNaughton preferred to deal with him rather than with Massey, reporting to Mackenzie King: "Their temperaments [Massey and McNaughton] were at opposite poles and neither felt at that early stage very comfortable and relaxed with one another".

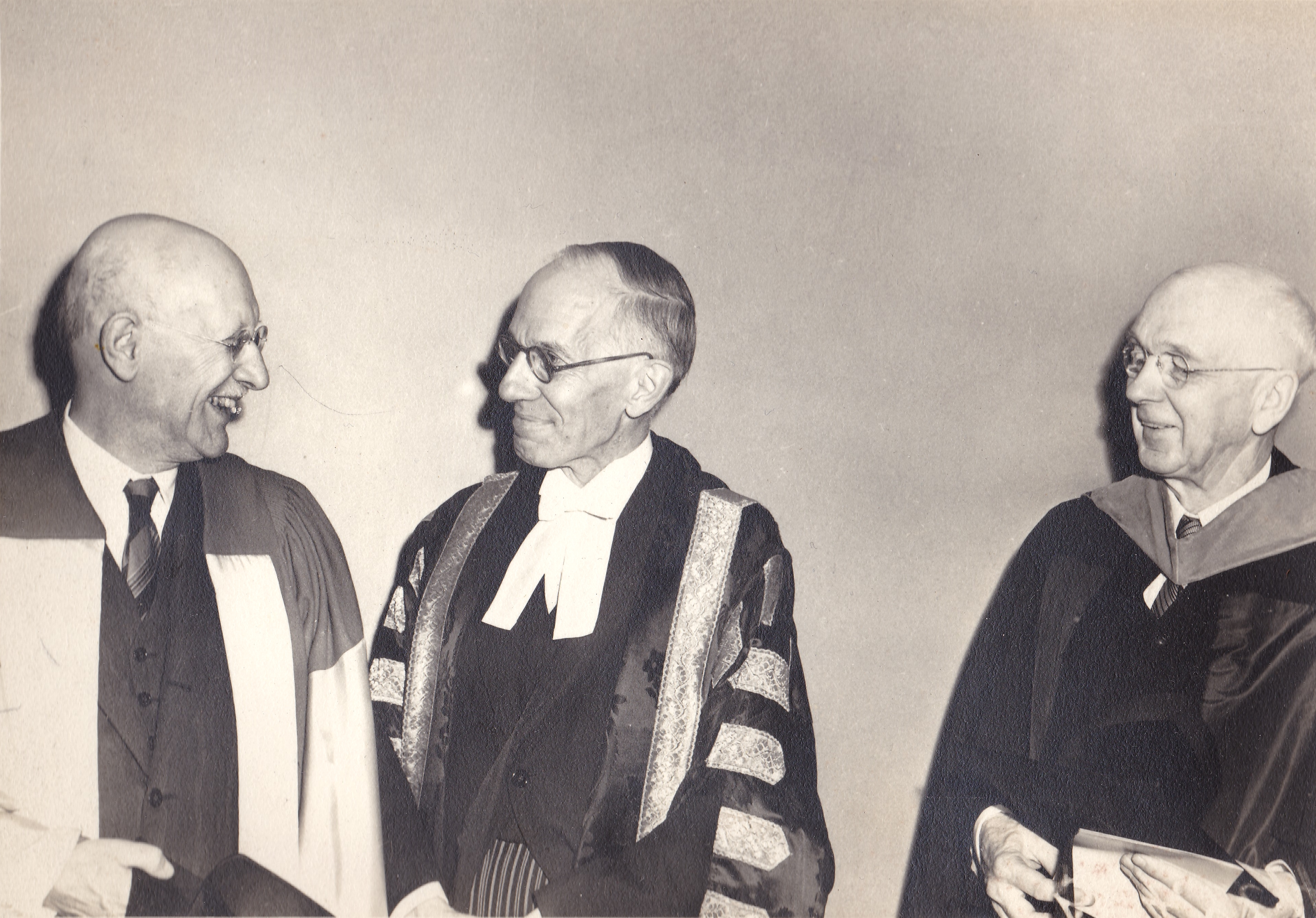
Massey (center) while serving as Chancellor of the University of Toronto

In the spring of 1943, Mackenzie King, who until then, had been almost always opposed to the Canadian Army actually fighting in the war, suddenly did a volte-face on the issue as he became consumed with the fear that the war might end with Canada winning no victories, which he believed would be the ruin of his political career. Mackenzie King now insisted that the 1st Canadian Infantry Division take part in Operation Husky, the invasion of Sicily planned for July 1943, despite the fact that the British did not want the 1st Division in Sicily. McNaughton was strongly opposed to losing a division from the First Canadian Army, which brought tensions with Massey to the fore as the latter on the behalf of Mackenzie King insisted that the 1st Division take part in Operation Husky. As McNaughton was very popular with both the troops under his command and with the Canadian people, Mackenzie King did not want McNaughton to resign in protest. After much haggling, it was agreed that the 1st Division would be detached from the First Canadian Army to serve as part of the British 8th Army in Sicily and would return to Britain to rejoin the 1st Army once the Sicilian campaign was over.

Upon his return to Canada Massey continued in the same cultural fields. He sat as chair of the National Gallery of Canada from 1948 to 1952 and served as Chancellor of the University of Toronto from 1948 to 1953. In 1949, Massey was appointed head of the Royal Commission on National Development in the Arts, Letters and Sciences, which investigated the overall state of culture in Canada. Its 1951 Report advocated federal funding of a wide range of cultural activities, and led to the establishment of the National Library of Canada and the Canada Council of the Arts.

== Governor General of Canada ==
Massey was the first Canadian-born individual to be appointed Governor General; all his predecessors had been born elsewhere in the British Empire or British Commonwealth. As a widower (his wife had died in 1950), he was also the only unmarried person ever to reside at Rideau Hall until the appointment of Julie Payette in 2017. Usually, the governor general's wife is the viceregal consort and acts as the hostess and chatelaine of the household; during Massey's tenure, his daughter-in-law, Lilias Massey, fulfilled the role, though she was not accorded the style of Her Excellency, usually given to the viceregal consort.

=== As governor general-designate ===
On February 1, 1952, the Office of the Prime Minister of Canada announced that George VI had approved Prime Minister Louis St. Laurent's choice of Massey to succeed the Viscount Alexander of Tunis as the King's representative. Five days later, however, the King was dead and Massey, upon his swearing-in, became the first Canadian-born representative of George's daughter, Queen Elizabeth II. In the bustle over the king's death, there was little fanfare around Massey's appointment; Lord Alexander quietly departed Canada shortly after the announcement of Massey as his successor, leaving Chief Justice Thibaudeau Rinfret as administrator of the government in his place, as Massey was, at the time, in London. As he was a member of the Privy Council of the United Kingdom, he attended the new queen's Accession Council on February 7.

In Canada, there was some commentary on the new representative of the monarch. The notion of a Canadian-born Governor General, and one not belonging to the peerage, was viewed with suspicion by traditionalists. Massey, thus, was to be a compromise: while it was known he was closely associated with the Liberal Party, having been the group's chairman during the 1930s, the governor general-designate was a Canadian by birth but he also embodied loyalty, dignity, and formality, as expected from a viceroy. Massey stated that, for his role as governor general, he looked for inspiration to one of his predecessors and a man Massey had known for decades: the Baron Tweedsmuir, whom Massey said he "greatly admired" and had "learnt much from" during his tenure as governor general.

Life magazine ran a profile piece on Massey in which the Marquess of Salisbury described Massey as an elegant individual—citing Massey's Oxford schooling and tailored clothing as illustrations—and thoroughly Canadian, though noting that "Vincent's a fine chap, but he does make one feel like a bit of a savage." But the elite demeanour he was sometimes criticized for was not evident in Massey's belief that the Crown belonged to Canadians and that it was his task as viceroy to act as a link between the people and the monarch. He similarly believed that the arts were a way to assert Canadian sovereignty and that the various artistic fields should be accessible to all Canadians.

=== In office ===
On February 28, 1952, Massey was sworn in as governor general of Canada in a ceremony in the Senate chamber, where he was presented with the Canadian Forces' Decoration (subsequently given to all governors general upon taking office). However, Massey's first months as the viceroy were muted, due to the ongoing 16-week period of official mourning. It was not until the coronation of Elizabeth II on June 2, 1953, that Massey was called upon to take charge of any national celebration. For the occasion, he revived the use of the state carriage when he rode in it, with an accompanying guard of Royal Canadian Mounted Police, from the royal and viceroyal residence of Rideau Hall to Parliament Hill, where he introduced to the gathered crowd the Queen's coronation speech, broadcast around the world via radio. He also gave a silver spoon to each child born on that day.

Massey welcomed the Queen and her consort, the Duke of Edinburgh, to Ottawa on three occasions from 1957 on; when the royal couple were engaged in a cross-country tour, Massey invited them to stay at his private estate, Batterwood, near Port Hope, Ontario. He also hosted a number of foreign heads of state, including United States president Dwight D. Eisenhower on November 13, 1953. As a return gesture, Massey was invited by Eisenhower to Washington, D.C., where, on May 4, 1954, he addressed a joint session of the United States Congress.

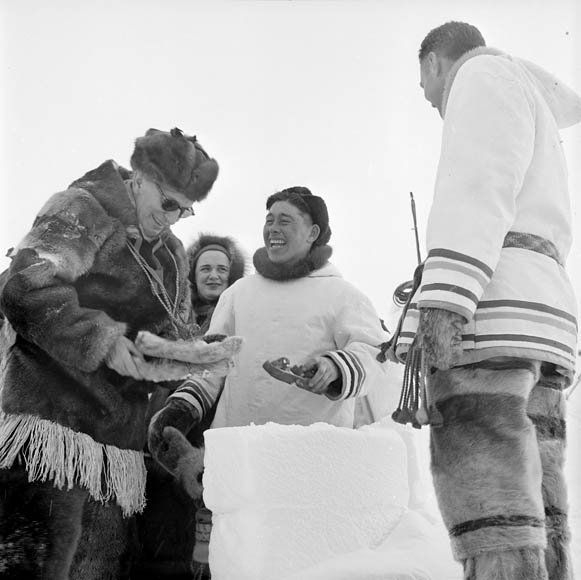
Massey (left) shares a laugh with an Inuk inhabitant of Frobisher Bay

It was Massey's intent as governor general to work to unite Canada's diverse cultures. He travelled across the country, using any and all available transportation, including canoe and dog sled, and delivered speeches promoting bilingualism, some 20 years before it became an official national policy. Some of his notable ceremonial duties included opening in 1955 the new home of the Royal Saskatchewan Museum and, with his 1958 Dominion Day speech, inaugurating the Canadian Broadcasting Corporation's first national televised broadcast. Massey also toured the Canadian arctic extensively, journeying to such places as Frobisher Bay and Hall Beach in the Northwest Territories, meeting with local Inuit residents, participating in their activities, and watching their performances. During his governor generalship, Massey also became actively involved with Upper Canada College, donating funds and his time to the school and seeing a number of spaces there named in his honour in return. As part of his effort to unify Canadians, it was Massey's desire to see established an entirely Canadian honours system. Though such a thing was never realised during his viceregal tenure, he helped lay the groundwork for the system that would be implemented by his successor, and in 1967, just months before his death, Massey was inducted as one of the first companions of the Order of Canada.

=== Promoting culture ===
Biographer Claude Bissell believed that Massey's most influential years were between 1949 and 1959, when Massey "made his major contribution. More than any other Canadian, he was responsible for the first major movement of the arts and letters from the periphery of national concern towards the centre. It was a notable achievement." In this vein, Massey created awards for artistic endeavours, such as the Governor General's Medals in Architecture, and promoted the concept of an annual, national arts festival, which eventually led to the founding of the National Arts Centre. Further, Massey initiated in 1954 the Governor General's gold medal for the Institute of Chartered Accountants, as well as in 1959 the Massey Medal, for excellence in geographic endeavours for the Royal Canadian Geographical Society.

== Post-viceregal life and death ==
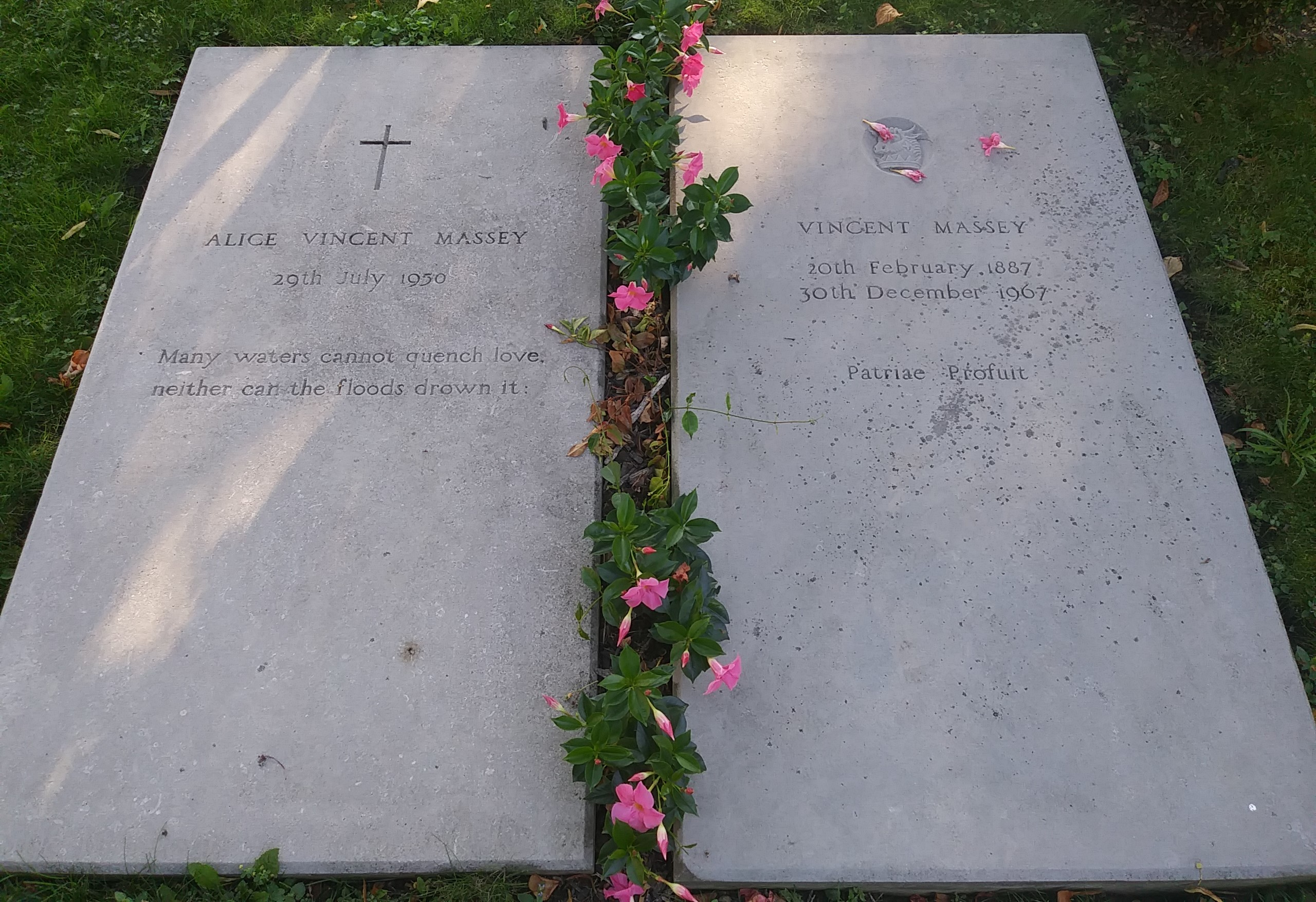
Massey's grave site

Upon his final departure from Rideau Hall as governor general, Massey retired to Batterwood House, in the village of Canton, near Port Hope, Ontario. For his service to the Crown, he was awarded from the Queen the Royal Victorian Chain, making him the second commoner or non-head of state, the first Canadian, and one of the only two Canadians to have ever received the honour. Just prior to the end of his time as governor general, the Queen wrote to Massey: "I wish to send you my congratulations and my sincere thanks for the manner in which you have discharged [your] duties. I know that as my personal representative you have always sought to maintain the right relationship between the Crown and the people of Canada. I am grateful to you for this because I regard it as the most important function among the many duties of the appointment which you have held with such distinction." The Queen had wanted to appoint Massey as a Knight of the Order of the Garter, but Prime Minister John Diefenbaker, after consulting the rest of Cabinet, advised the Queen against conferring the honour.

Massey continued his philanthropic work, dedicating his time to the stewardship of the Massey Foundation, and its endowment to the University of Toronto, in particular. His donation of Hart House to the University of Toronto stipulated that the building be restricted to men only, and it was not until after his death that the deed of gift was altered to allow for women becoming full members in 1972. While Hart House continued as one of the recipients of Massey's attention and funds, Massey also expanded the scope of his donations to U of T with the establishment in 1963 of Massey College, to which Massey's protégé, Robertson Davies, was appointed as the college's first master. In 1961, the Massey Lectures were also initiated, conceived as a focus on important contemporary issues by leading thinkers, and they remain considered as the most important public lecture series in Canada.

At the end of 1967, on December 30, Massey died while on holiday in the United Kingdom. His remains were returned to Canada and he was, as is customary for former governors general, given a state funeral, in early January 1968. He was buried alongside his wife at historic St. Mark's Church in Port Hope; his was among the last burials permitted in the small cemetery (Farley Mowat was interred in 2014).

== Honours ==
Appointments

- 1946 – December 30, 1967: Member of the Order of the Companions of Honour (CH)
- September 16, 1925 – December 30, 1967: Member of the King's Privy Council for Canada (PC)
- June 6, 1941 – December 30, 1967: Member of His Majesty's Most Honourable Privy Council
- February 28, 1952 – 1955: Knight of Justice, Prior, and Chief Officer in Canada of the Most Venerable Order of the Hospital of Saint John of Jerusalem
  - July 1, 1955 – September 15, 1959: Bailiff Grand Cross, Prior, and Chief Officer in Canada of the Most Venerable Order of the Hospital of Saint John of Jerusalem
  - September 15, 1959 – December 30, 1967: Bailiff Grand Cross of the Venerable Order of Saint John
- February 28, 1952 – September 15, 1959: Chief Scout of Canada
- 1952 – December 30, 1967: Honorary Member of the Royal Military College of Canada Club
- July 9, 1967 – December 30, 1967: Companion of the Order of Canada (CC)
- Honorary Fellow of the Royal Society of Canada (FRSC(hon))

Medals

- (Canada) 1935: King George V Silver Jubilee Medal
- (Canada) 1937: King George VI Coronation Medal
- (Canada) February 28, 1952: Canadian Forces' Decoration (CD)
- (Canada) 1953: Queen Elizabeth II Coronation Medal
- (Canada) 1967: Canadian Centennial Medal

Awards

- July 22, 1960: Royal Victorian Chain
- December 11, 1963: Augmentation of honour

=== Honorary military appointments ===
- (Canada) February 28, 1952 – September 15, 1959: Colonel of the Governor General's Horse Guards
- (Canada) February 28, 1952 – September 15, 1959: Colonel of the Governor General's Foot Guards
- (Canada) February 28, 1952 – September 15, 1959: Colonel of the Canadian Grenadier Guards

=== Honorary degrees ===
- (Canada) 1951: Queen's University, Doctor of Laws (LLD)
- (Canada) May 13, 1955: University of Saskatchewan, Doctor of Laws (LLD)
- (Canada) May 18, 1954: University of British Columbia, Doctor of Laws (LLD)

=== Honorific eponyms ===
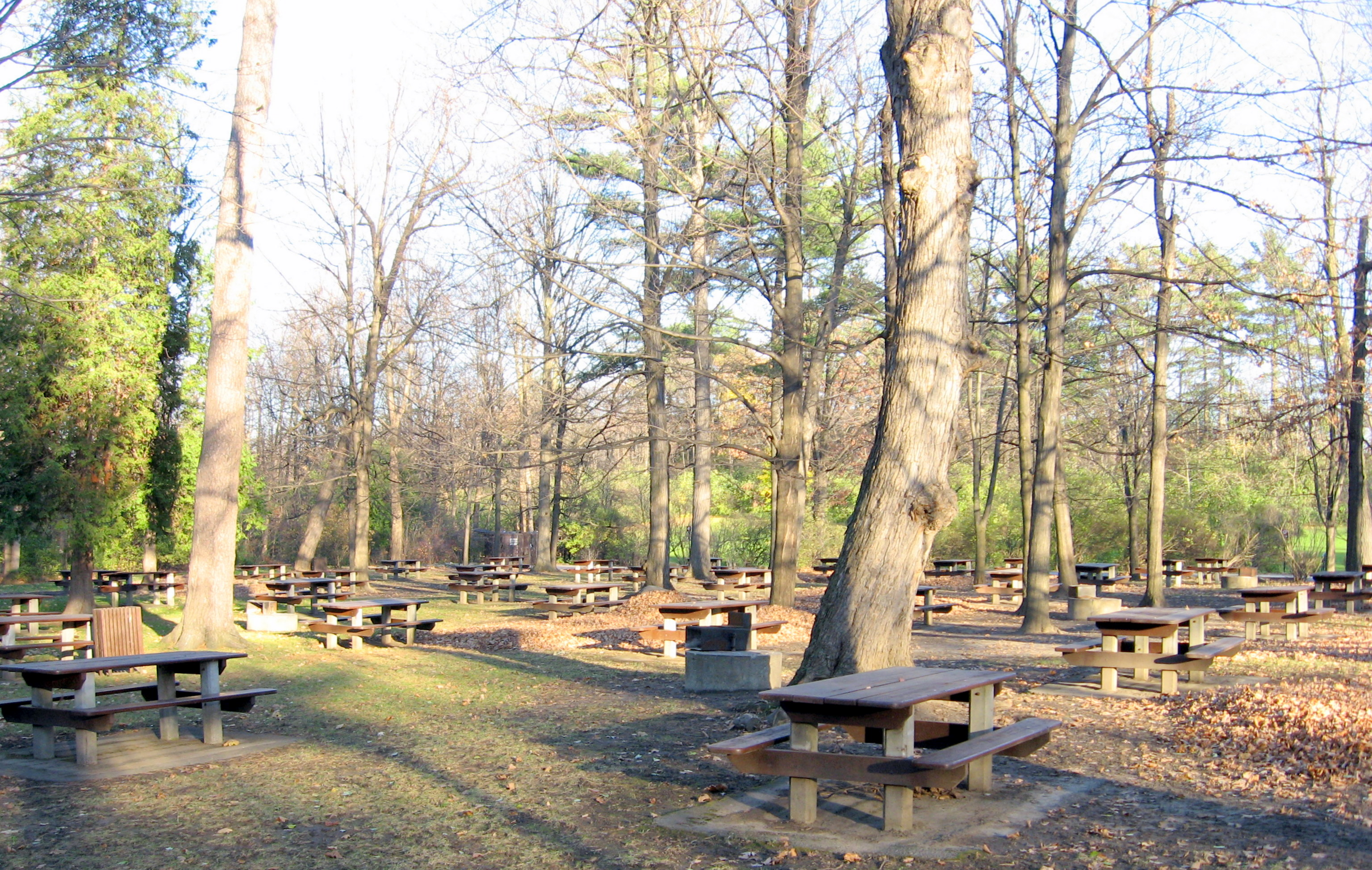
Vincent Massey Park in Ottawa

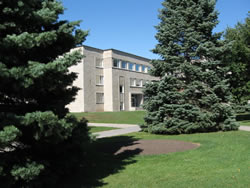
Vincent Massey library at Royal Military College of Canada in Kingston, Ontario

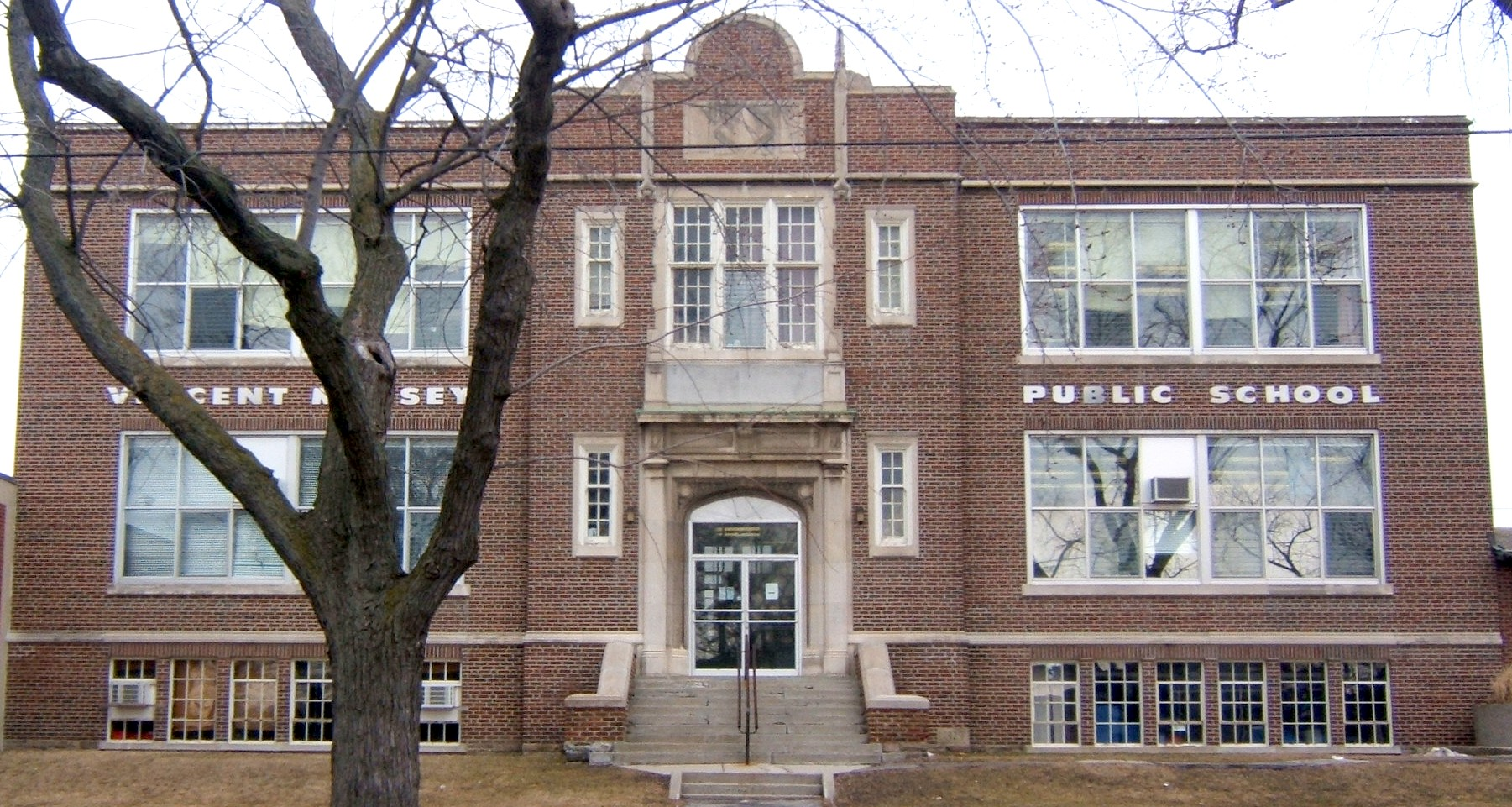
Vincent Massey Public School in Toronto

Events

- (Canada) : Massey Lectures

Geographic locations

- Alberta: Mount Massey
- Newfoundland and Labrador: Massey Drive
- Ontario: Massey, Ontario
- Ontario: Vincent Massey Park, Ottawa
- Saskatchewan: Massey Place, Saskatoon
- Saskatchewan: Massey Park, Saskatoon

Buildings

- British Columbia: Vincent Massey Theatre (later Massey Theatre), New Westminster
- Ontario: Massey Building, Royal Military College of Canada, Kingston
  - Massey Library, within the Massey Building
- Ontario: Massey Quadrangle, Upper Canada College, Toronto
- Ontario: Vincent Massey Memorial Centre, Bewdley
- Ontario: Massey House, Trinity College, Toronto
- Quebec: Place Vincent Massey, Gatineau
- Quebec: Massey Building, Collège militaire royal de Saint-Jean, Saint-Jean-sur-Richelieu

Schools

- Alberta: Vincent Massey Junior High School, Calgary
- Alberta: Vincent Massey School, Medicine Hat
- Manitoba: Vincent Massey High School, Brandon
- Manitoba: Vincent Massey Collegiate, Winnipeg
- New Brunswick: Vincent Massey Elementary School, St. Andrews
- Ontario: Vincent Massey Public School, Bowmanville
- Ontario: Vincent Massey Public School, Cornwall (closed)
- Ontario: Vincent Massey Collegiate Institute, Etobicoke (closed)
- Ontario: Vincent Massey Public School, Etobicoke
- Ontario: Vincent Massey Public School, Etobicoke (closed)
- Ontario: Vincent Massey School, Hamilton
- Ontario: Vincent Massey Public School, North Bay
- Ontario: Vincent Massey Public School, Oshawa
- Ontario: Vincent Massey Public School, Ottawa
- Ontario: Vincent Massey School, Ottawa
- Ontario: Massey College, University of Toronto, Toronto
- Ontario: Vincent Massey Secondary School, Windsor
- Quebec: Vincent Massey Collegiate, Montreal
- Quebec: Vincent Massey Elementary School, Saint-Hubert
- Quebec: Massey-Vanier High School, Cowansville
- Saskatchewan: Vincent Massey Community School, Prince Albert
- Saskatchewan: Ecole Massey School, Regina
- Saskatchewan: Vincent Massey School, Saskatoon
- Saskatchewan: Vincent Massey Public School, Saskatoon

Ships

- (Canada) CCGS Vincent Massey (acquired on October 17, 2022)

Civic structures

- Ontario: Massey Road, Canton

=== Arms ===
Coat of arms of Vincent Massey
Notes By the time he was serving as the Canadian Minister to the United States, Massey was granted a coat of arms by the College of Arms, in London, United Kingdom. These were reworked by Alan Beddoe, and after the end of Massey's viceregal service, he was granted an augmentation of honour by Queen Elizabeth II. Adopted December 18, 1927; December 11, 1963 (augmentation) Crest Out of an Antique Crown Or, a Bull's Head Sable, armed Gold, charged on the neck with a Lozenge Argent, thereon a Fleur de Lis also Sable. Escutcheon Argent, on a Chevron Sable between three Lozenges of the last, each charged with a Fleur de Lis of the first, three Stags' Heads erased Or. Motto DUM TERAR PROSUM ('Though I am trodden down, I am of service') Other elements On the escutcheon a Canton Azure, a representation of the Crest of Canada as an honourable augmentation.

== List of works ==
- The making of a nation. Boston; New York: Houghton Mifflin company. 1928. p. 44.
- Good neighbourhood: and other addresses in the United States. Toronto: The Macmillan of Canada. 1930. p. 362.
- Canada in the world. Toronto: J.M. Dent & Sons. 1935. p. 229.
- The sword of Lionheart & other wartime speeches. Toronto: The Ryerson Press. 1942. p. 117.
- On being Canadian. Toronto: J.M. Dent. 1948. p. 198.
- Things that remain. Toronto: author's lecture notes. 1952. p. 16.
- On books & reading. Toronto: Ryerson. 1954. p. 12.
- The Canadian Club of Montreal 1905–1955. Montreal: Canadian Club of Montreal. 1955. p. 16.
- Uncertain sounds. Sackville, N.B.: Mount Allison University. 1957. p. 38.
- Speaking of Canada: addresses. London: Macmillan. 1959. p. 244.
- Canadians and their Commonwealth. Oxford: Clarendon Press. 1961. p. 20.
- What's past is prologue: the memoirs of the Right Honourable Vincent Massey, C.H. Toronto: Macmillan. 1963. p. 540.
- Confederation on the march: views on major Canadian issues during the sixties. Toronto: Macmillan. 1965. p. 101.

== Electoral record ==
1925 Canadian federal election: Durham
Party	Candidate	Votes	%	±%}
Conservative	Fred Wellington Bowen	7,020	53.61	+12.71
Liberal	Charles Vincent Massey	6,074	46.39	+5.48

== Medals ==

Ribbon	Description	Notes
	Order of the Companions of Honour (CH)	Officer of the Order in 1967
	Order of Canada	Companion of the Order in 1967
	Royal Victorian Chain	Awarded in 1960
	Order of St John of Jerusalem	Knight of Justice, Prior, and Chief Officer in Canada of the Order in 1955
	King George V Silver Jubilee Medal	
	King George VI Coronation Medal	
	Queen Elizabeth II Coronation Medal	
	Canadian Centennial Medal	
	Canadian Forces' Decoration (CD)	

== See also ==
- Diplomatic corps
- Massey Foundation

== Sources ==
- Aster, Sidney (1973). 1939: The Making of the Second World War. New York: Simon & Schuster. ISBN 978-0-233-96369-3.
- Beloff, Max (1989). Imperial Sunset. Volume 2: Dream of Commonwealth, 1921–42. London: Macmillan. ISBN 978-1-349-08356-5.
- Bissell, Claude Thomas (1986). The Imperial Canadian: Vincent Massey in Office. Toronto: University of Toronto Press. ISBN 978-0-8020-5656-6.
- Graham Fry, Michael (1999). "Agents and Structures: The Dominions and the Czechoslovak Crisis, September 1938". In Igor Lukes; Erik Goldstein (eds.). The Munich Crisis, 1938: Prelude to World War II. London: Frank Cass. pp. 293–341. ISBN 978-0-7146-8056-9.
- Morton, Desmond (1999). A Military History of Canada. McClelland & Stewart. ISBN 978-0-7710-6514-9.
- Stewart, Andrew (2008). Empire Lost: Britain, the Dominions and the Second World War. London: A&C Black. ISBN 978-1-84725-244-9.
- Weinberg, Gerhard L. (1980). The Foreign Policy of Hitler's Germany: Starting World War II, 1937–1939. Chicago: University of Chicago Press. ISBN 978-0-226-88511-7.
- White, Randall (1993). Too Good to Be True: Toronto in the 1920s. Toronto: Dundurn Press. ISBN 978-1-55002-197-4.

Government offices
Preceded by The Viscount Alexander of Tunis	Governor General of Canada; 1952–1959	Succeeded by Georges Vanier
Political offices
12th Canadian Ministry (1921–1926) – First cabinet of William Lyon Mackenzie King
Cabinet post (1)
Predecessor	Office	Successor
n/a	Minister without portfolio September 16, 1925 – November 12, 1925	n/a
Diplomatic posts
Preceded by Howard Ferguson	Canadian High Commissioner to the United Kingdom; November 8, 1935 – September 1, 1946	Succeeded by Norman Robertson
Preceded by New title	Canadian Envoy Extraordinary and Minister Plenipotentiary to the United States; November 25, 1926 – July 23, 1930	Succeeded by William Duncan Herridge
Party political offices
Preceded by none	President of the National Liberal Federation; 1932–1935	Succeeded by Norman Platt Lambert
Academic offices
Preceded by Henry John Cody	Chancellor of the University of Toronto; 1947–1953	Succeeded by Samuel Beatty
