= Canton, Ontario =

Canton
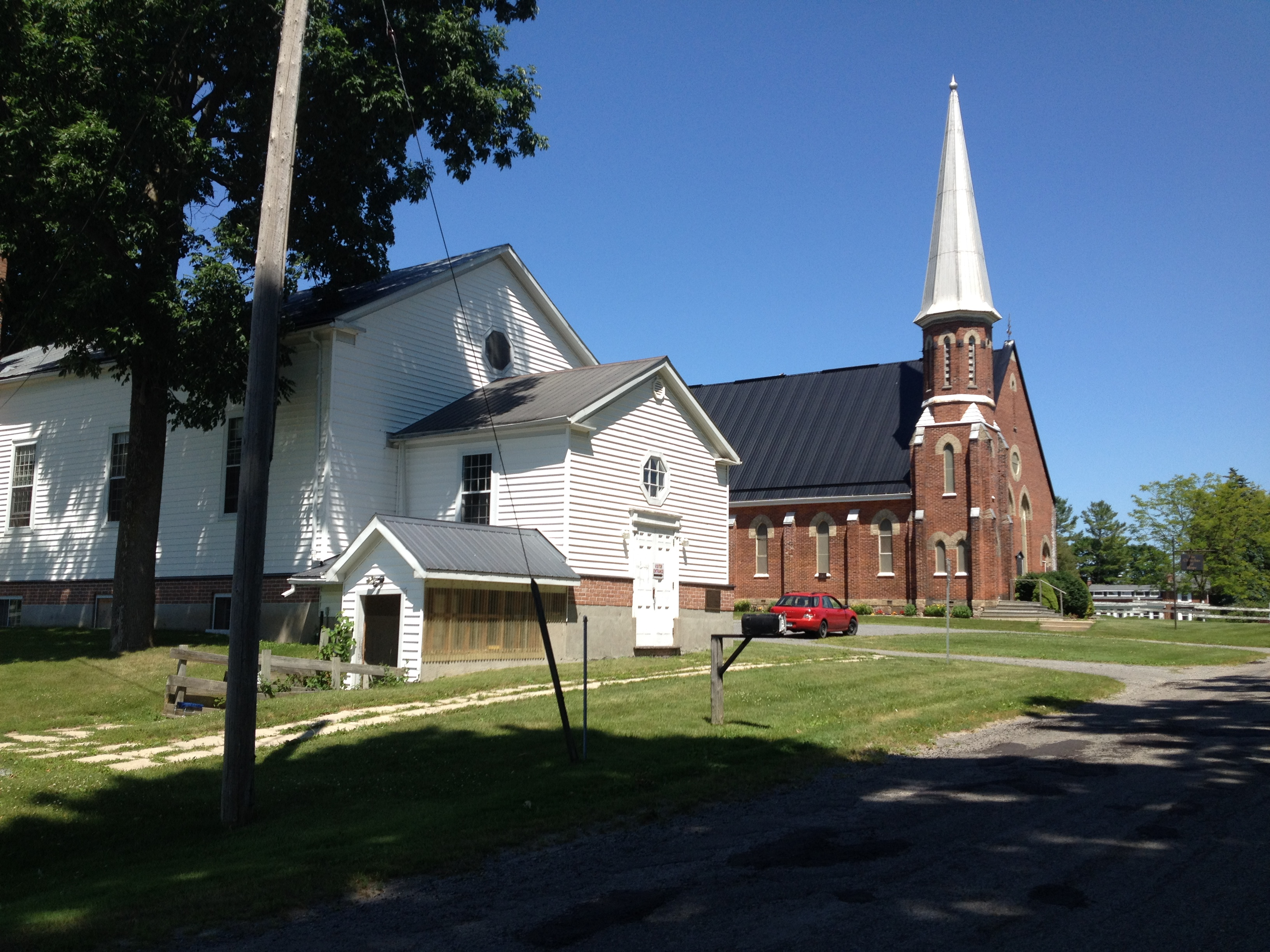
- 1832 chapel (foreground) and 1876 church

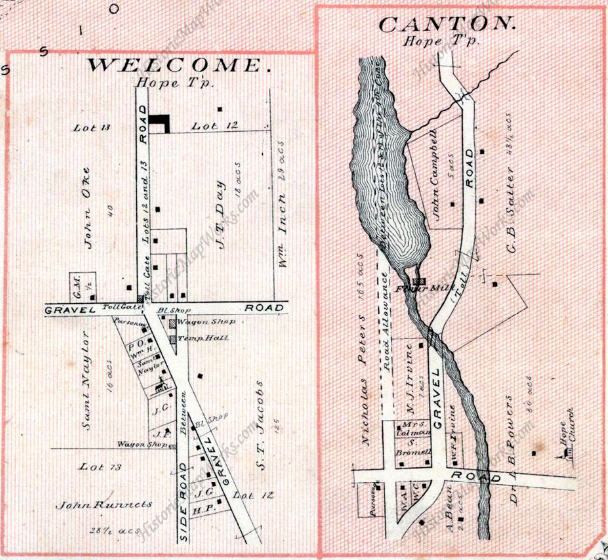
- Plan of Welcome and Canton in 1878

- Location in Ontario
- Coordinates: 43.9976°N 78.35097°W
- Country: Canada
- Province: Ontario
- County: Northumberland
- Municipality: Port Hope
- Elevation: 122 m (400 ft)
- Time zone: UTC-5 (EST)
  - Summer (DST): UTC-4 (EDT)

Canton is a hamlet in southeastern Ontario, a few kilometers (a few miles) north of Port Hope. It has a small wooden chapel built in 1832, one of the oldest in the region. Canton was once the home of Vincent Massey, the lawyer, diplomat and Governor General of Canada.

== Location ==
Canton is on County Road 10 where it crosses the Ganaraska River, at an elevation of about 122 m (400 feet) above sea level. It is about 8 km (5 miles) inland from Port Hope. Canton Airport lies about 0.5 km (0.31 miles) to the northwest of Canton at an elevation of 160 m (520 feet). It has an asphalt runway 597 by 12 m (1,958 by 40 feet) that is not maintained in winter.

== Foundation ==
The Hawkins family came from Port Hope to settle in Canton before 1820. A log building on the property of James Hawkins was used as a school and chapel by 1820. The wooden "Hope Chapel" was built by the people of Canton in 1832. The small wooden Methodist chapel was one of the first churches in the area. The chapel and graveyard lie on the fourth line, just east of County Road 10. The oldest grave is that of a member of the Hawkins family.

== 19th century ==
An 1869 gazetteer of Ontario described Canton as a village on Smith's Creek, (Note: The Ganaraska – and Port Hope – were called "Smith's Creek" after the early settler (and Sergeant with the Butler’s Rangers) Peter Smith (c 1751-1826), a fur trader who had a house near the mouth of the creek in 1788. The settlement was renamed "Port Hope" in 1818, despite a move to call it "Toronto". The Mississaugas called the creek "Pemitiscutiank". It took its present name from the Cayuga village of Ganaraske, which stood on the creek.) in the township of Hope, County Durham. The average price of land was CDN$50 per acre, and the population was 100 in twenty-eight households. Most of the people were farmers, but there was a justice of the peace, a doctor, a Wesleyan minister, a postmaster and general merchant, a lumber dealer, a miller, a dressmaker, two coopers, two carpenters and Thomas Martin, proprietor of the Canton Hotel. A new church building was erected beside the Hope Chapel by local craftsmen in 1876.

By 1880 the post village of Canton had a population of 200. The Canton Mill on the Ganaraska River has a date stone that says "W.H.Kinsman, Canton, 1886". The Advertisers Handbook of 1912 reported that the mill was still operated by W.H.Kinsman. The mill was water-powered, used for grinding flour. Fred Currelley, secretary of the Perrytown cheese factory, lived in Canton in 1891.

Sergeant Edward Edwin Dodd(s) (1845–1901) was born nearby. During the American Civil War (1861–65) he served as a volunteer and was awarded a Medal of Honor for bravery in rescuing his wounded captain in the face of enemy fire. He is buried in the Canton cemetery, which has a commemorative plaque in his honor.

== 20th century ==
The village was once the home of Vincent Massey (1887–1967). The Masseys purchased an old farmhouse and surrounding property in 1918, and converted it into Batterwood House in 1927, the Masseys' main residence. The Batterwood property was next to the property of George MacKinnon Wrong, a longtime friend of Massey who was Professor of Modern History at the University of Toronto. Eugene Forsey, who had been hired to teach the two Massey boys wrote, "The place is beautiful – rolling country, lightly wooded here and there with a stream ending in a mill pond almost below the hill window."

In 1927 the Massey Foundation and the Canton United Church provided funding to move the Hope Chapel from its original location on the northwest corner of the property to its present site. The building was placed on cement foundations, was lengthened to include a stage, and had a kitchen and dining room added. The Hope Chapel is now the Canton Hall. As of 2014 the church was in good repair, with a new steel roof, but attendance was low. The Canton Mill still stands, but is privately owned and is not open to the public.

The Canton Municipal Office, at 5325 County Road 10, is just to the north of the village. In 2007 a consultant reviewed the use and condition of properties owned by the municipality of Port Hope. One of the recommendations was to relocate parks, recreation and culture staff from the Canton Municipal Office to the Town Hall. The Canton Municipal Office could be used as a community meeting space.

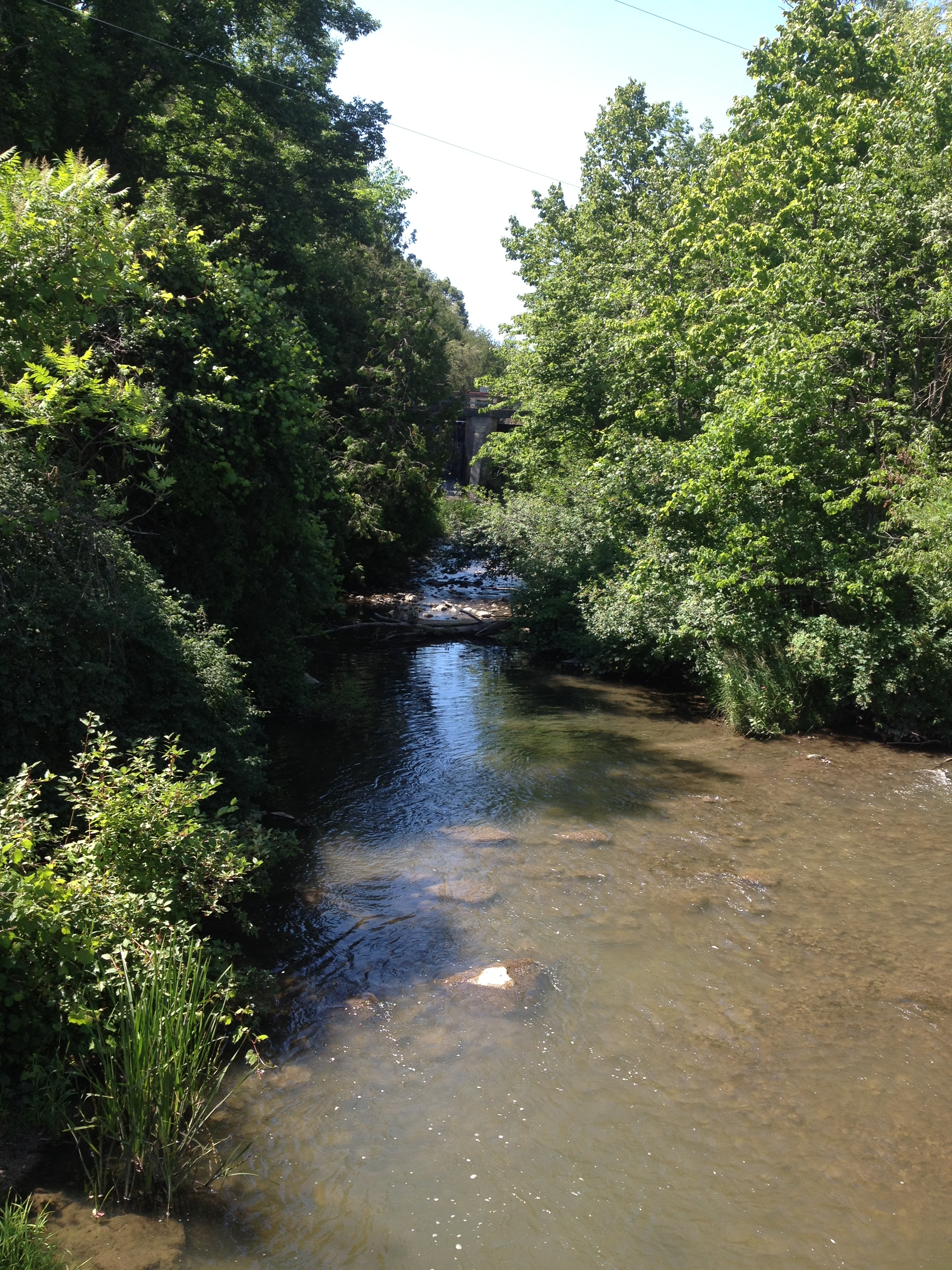
Mill creek west from County Road 10

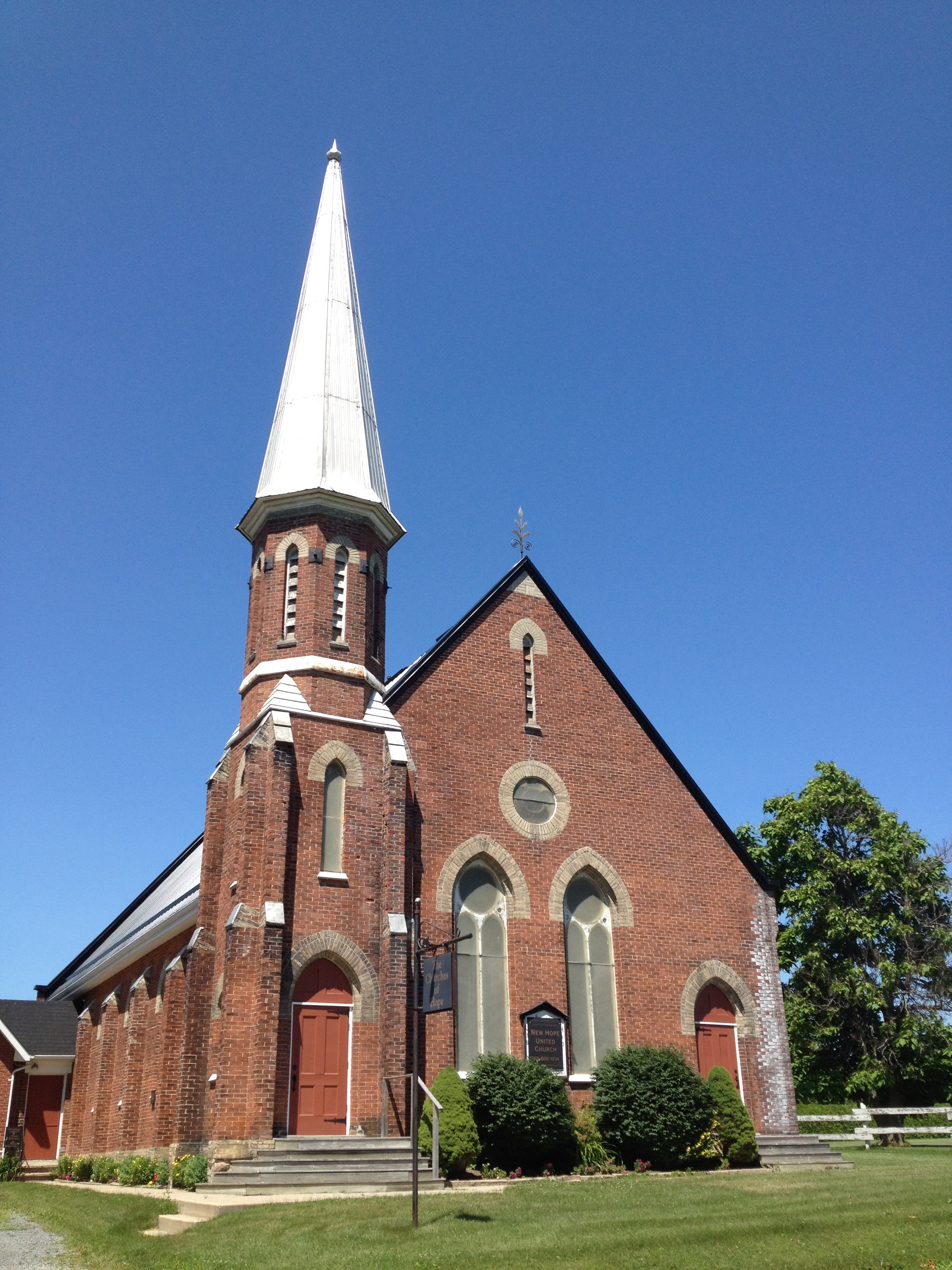
Canton United Church

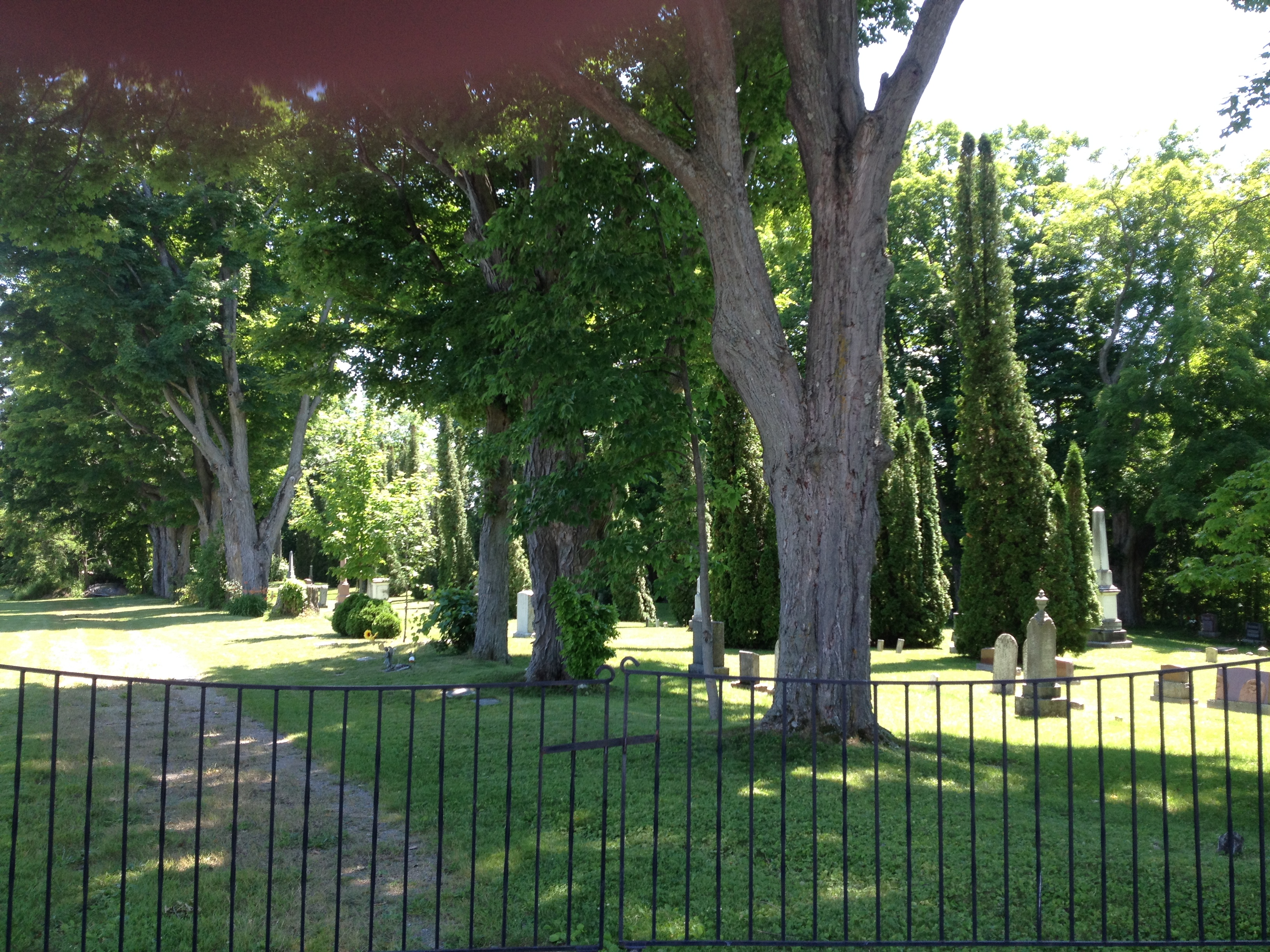
Graveyard

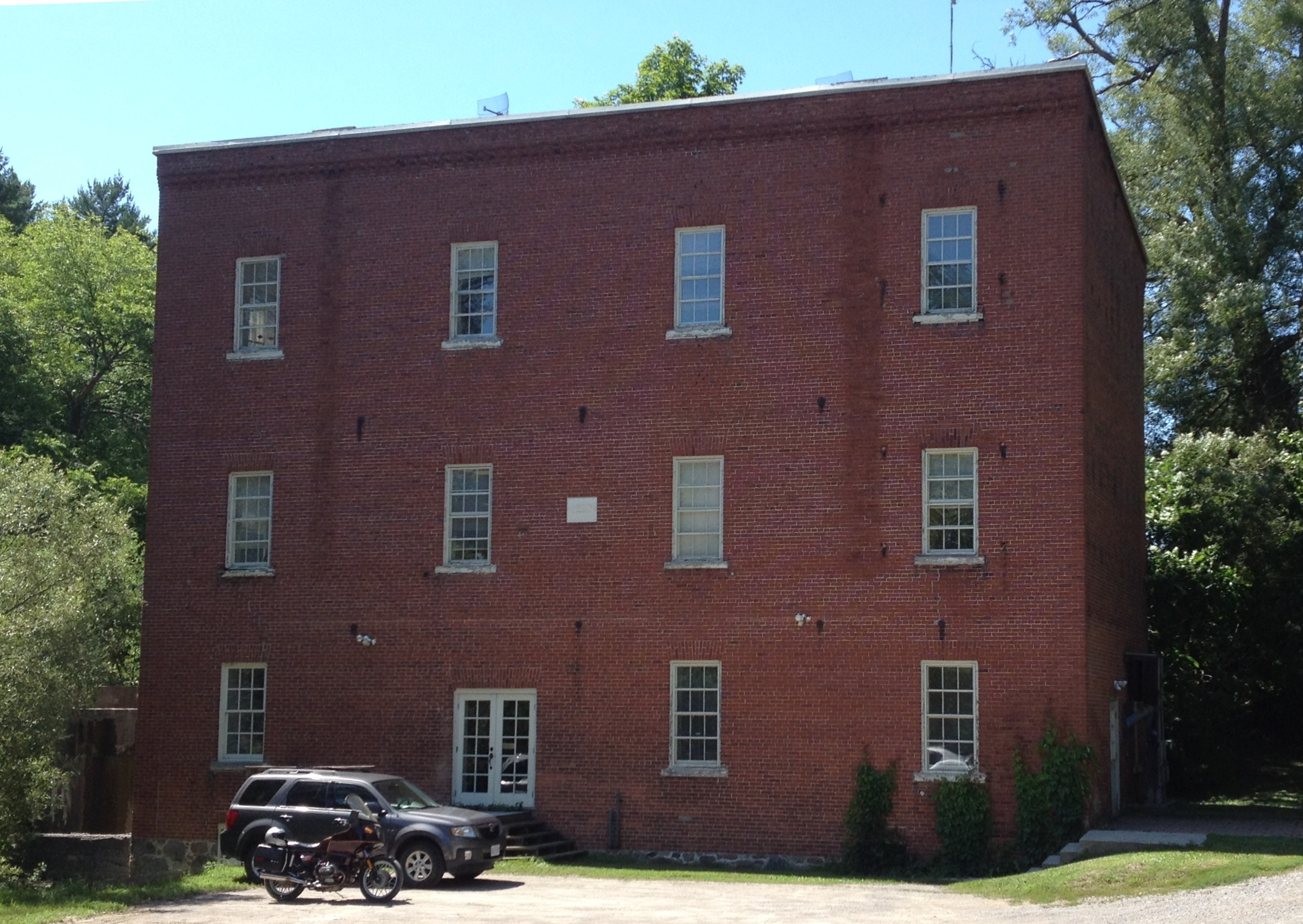
Former flour mill

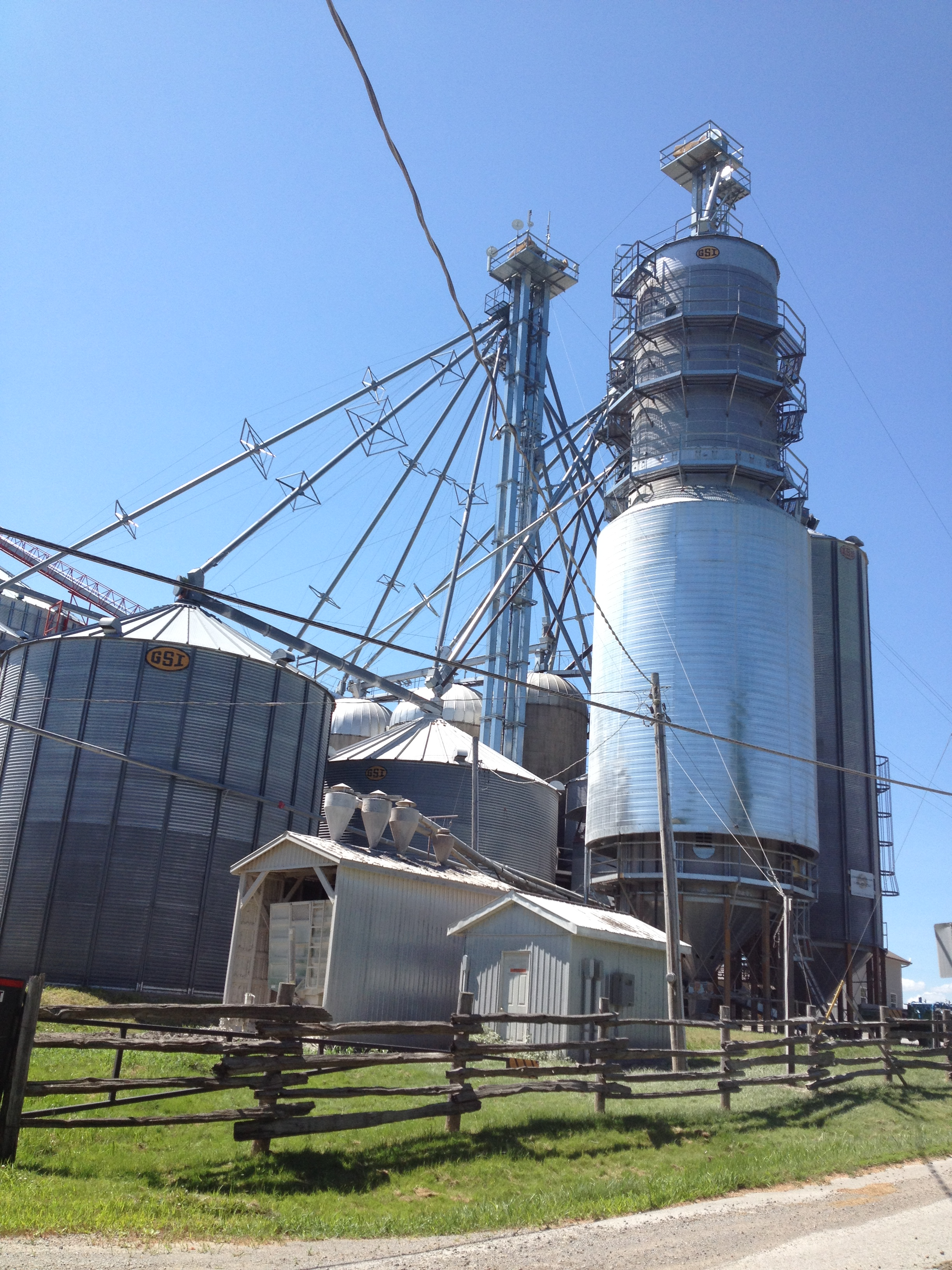
Grain storage on Kellogg Road to the west

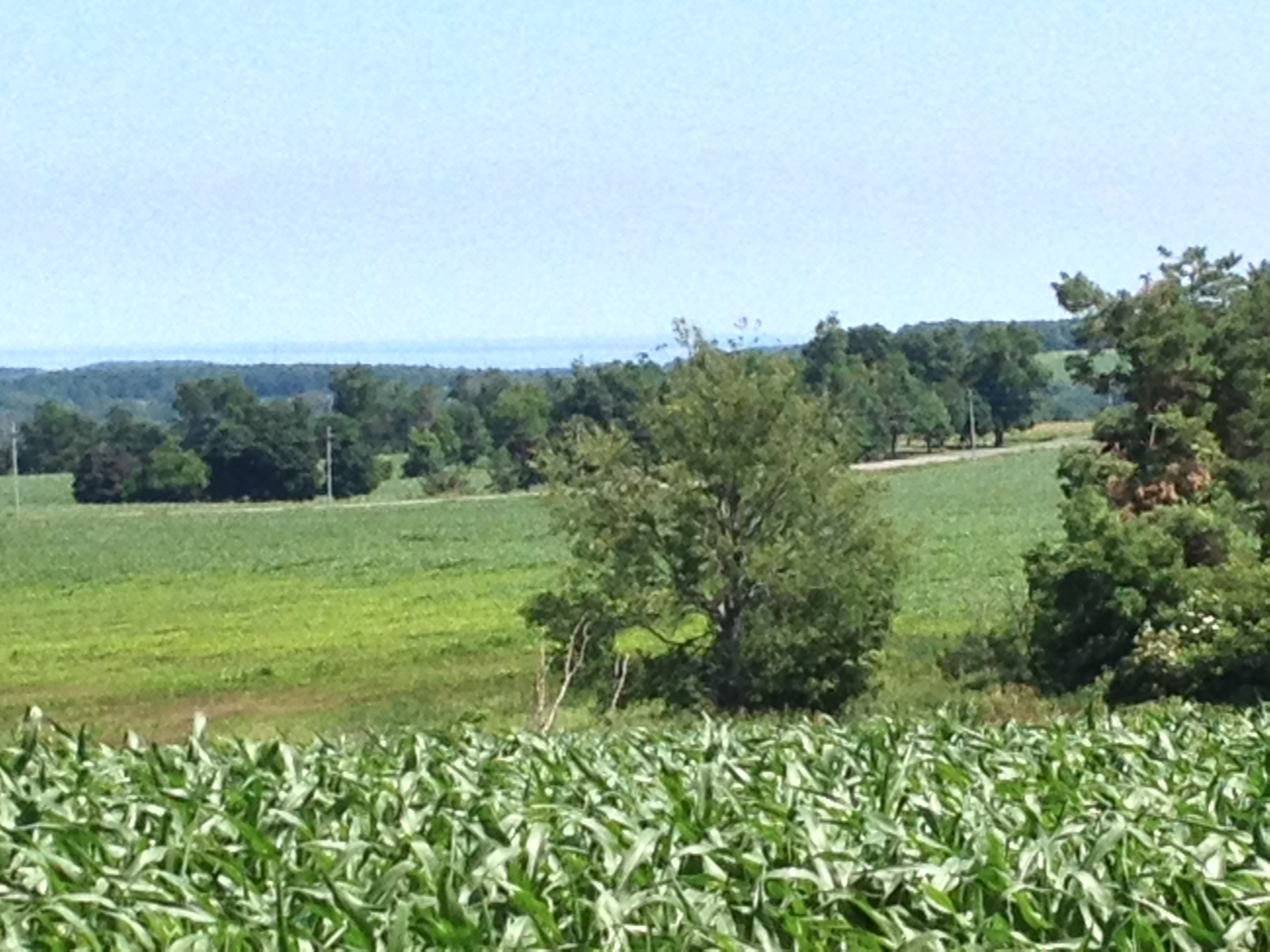
Looking south from St. Paul's Anglican Church in Perrytown towards Canton and Lake Ontario
