= Viceregal consort of Canada =

Spouse of the Governor General of Canada

- Current vacant since June 8, 2026
- Style: His/Her Excellency
- Residence: Rideau Hall (main); La Citadelle (secondary)
- Term length: While married to the governor general of Canada
- Website: Official website of the most recent viceregal consort at the Wayback Machine (archived May 21, 2026)

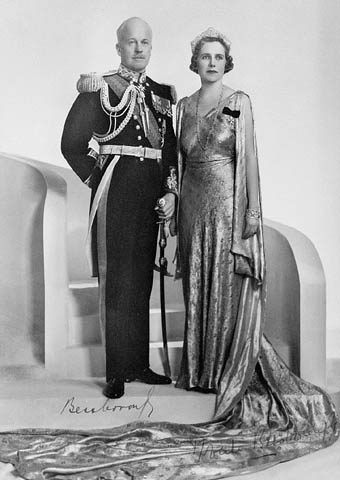
The Countess of Bessborough (right), viceregal consort of Canada, with her husband, the 9th Earl of Bessborough, in their official photograph as governor general and viceregal consort of Canada, 1933

The viceregal consort of Canada is the spouse of the serving governor general of Canada, assisting the viceroy with ceremonial and charitable work, accompanying him or her to official state occasions, and occasionally undertaking philanthropic work of their own. As the host/hostess of the royal and viceroyal residence in Ottawa, the consort, if female, is also known as the chatelaine of Rideau Hall. This individual, who ranks third in the Canadian order of precedence, after the Canadian monarch and the governor general, is addressed as His or Her Excellency while their spouse is in office, and is made ex officio an Extraordinary Companion (French: Compagnon Extraordinaire) of the Order of Canada and a Knight or Dame of Justice of the Most Venerable Order of the Hospital of Saint John of Jerusalem.

== Role ==
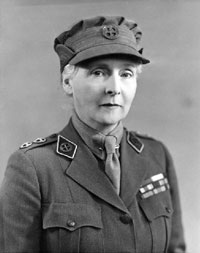
Princess Alice, Countess of Athlone, c. 1942

The position of the viceregal consort carries no official duties and receives no salary. However, consorts have held and do hold a prominent and visible position in the Canadian affairs of state, taking part in official occasions, such as the speech from the throne and Order of Canada investitures, and national celebrations, such as Canada Day events on Parliament Hill, as well as both welcoming foreign dignitaries to Canada and accompanying the governor general on state visits abroad. These practices evolved from the original role as the hostess of the royal and viceroyal residences in Ottawa (Rideau Hall) and Quebec City (La Citadelle), a tradition maintained only by female viceregal consorts, who oversee the planning of ceremonies and functions of state that take place at either of the official residences.

Over the course of the 20th century, it became increasingly common for viceregal consorts to select and pursue on their own initiative various charitable projects. Princess Alice, Countess of Athlone, whose husband served as governor general during the Second World War, volunteered her time to the war effort in Canada, especially women's organisations such as the Royal Canadian Air Force Women's Division. The activities chosen are typically apolitical and non-divisive. However, some consorts have stirred controversy through their work; Jean-Daniel Lafond, who promoted Canadian art—film in particular—and involved himself in the Francophone community, made a documentary while viceregal consort that attracted criticism from the National Post that Lafond had shown strong anti-Americanism and had been sympathetic to an admitted assassin.

Only once has the title of Chatelaine of Rideau Hall been held by someone who was not the spouse of the governor general—as Vincent Massey was a widower, his daughter-in-law, Lilias Massey, held the title and performed the official duties of the chatelaine. Unlike a viceregal consort, however, Lilias Massey was not addressed as Her Excellency.

== List of viceregal consorts ==
=== Viceregal consorts of New France, 1627–1760 ===
#	Name	Dates	Spouse
1	Hélène de Champlain (née Boullé)	1627–1635	Samuel de Champlain
	None	1635–1648	Charles de Montmagny
2	Marie-Barbe d'Ailleboust (née de Boullongne)	1648–1651	Louis d'Ailleboust de Coulonge
	None (Note: Lauson's wife, Mariede Lauson (née Gaudar), died in France prior to the former's appointment as governor.)	1651–1657	Jean de Lauson
	None	1658–1661	Le vicomte de Mouzay
	None	1661–1663	Le baron d'Avaugour
	None	1663–1665	Augustin de Saffray de Mésy
	None	1665–1672	Daniel de Rémy de Courcelle
3	La comtesse de Frontenac et de Palluau (née Anne de la Grange-Trianon) (Note: The couple was separated during the governor's tenure.)	1672–1682	Le comte de Frontenac et de Palluau
4	Marie Mandat (Note: The governor's wife did not accompany him.)	1682–1685	Joseph-Antoine de La Barre
5	La marquise de Denonville (née Catherine Courtin)	1685–1689	Le marquis de Denonville
	None	1689–1698	Le comte de Frontenac et de Palluau
	None	1698–1703	Louis-Hector de Callière
6	La marquise de Vaudreuil (née Louise-Élisabeth de Joybert)	1703–1725	Le marquis de Vaudreuil
7	La marquise de Beauharnois (née Renée Pays)	1725–1747	Le marquis de Beauharnois
8	La marquise de La Galissonnière (née Marie-Catherine-Antoinette de Lauson)	1747–1749	Le marquis de La Galissonnière
9	La marquise de la Jonquière (née Marie-Angélique de La Valette)	1749–1752	Le marquis de la Jonquière
	None	1752–1755	Le marquis du Quesne
	None	1755–1760	Le marquis de Vaudreuil-Cavagnal

=== Viceregal consorts of British North America, 1760–1867 ===
#	Name	Dates	Spouse
10	Lady Jane Amherst (née Dalison)	1760–1763	Sir Jeffrey Amherst
11	Cordelia Murray (née Collier)	1764–1768	James Murray
12	Lady Maria Carleton (née Howard)	1768–1778	Sir Guy Carleton
	None	1778–1786	Sir Frederick Haldimand
12	The Lady Dorchester (previously Lady Maria Carleton)	1786–1796	The Lord Dorchester
13	Unknown	1796–1799	Robert Prescott
14	Lady Charlotte Frances Milnes (née Bentinck)	1799–1805	Sir Robert Shore Milnes
15	Lady Henriette Dunn (née Guichaud)	1805–1807	Sir Thomas Dunn
	None	1807–1811	Sir James Henry Craig
16	Lady Catherine Anne Prevost (née Phipps)	1811–1815	Sir George Prevost
17	Lady Margaret Drummond (née Russell)	1815–1816	Sir Gordon Drummond
18	Lady Katherine Sherbrooke (née Pyndar)	1816–1818	Sir John Coape Sherbrooke
19	The Duchess of Richmond (née Charlotte Gordon)	1818–1820	The Duke of Richmond
20	The Countess of Dalhousie (née Christina Broun)	1820–1828	The Earl of Dalhousie
	None	1828–1830	Sir James Kempt
21	The Lady Aylmer (née Louisa Anne Call)	1830–1835	The Lord Aylmer
22	The Countess of Gosford (née Mary Sparrow)	1835–1837	The Earl of Gosford
23	Lady Elizabeth Colborne (née Yonge)	1837–1838	Sir John Colborne
24	The Countess of Durham (née Louisa Elizabeth Grey)	1838–1839	The Earl of Durham
	None	1839–1941	The Lord Sydenham
25	Lady Mary Charlotte Anne Bagot (née Wellesley-Pole)	1842–1843	Sir Charles Bagot
	None	1843–1845	Sir Charles Metcalfe
26	The Countess Cathcart (née Henrietta Mather)	1846–1847	The Earl Cathcart
27	The Countess of Elgin and Kincardine (née Mary Lambton)	1847–1854	The Earl of Elgin and Kincardine
28	Lady Anna Maria Head (née Yorke)	1854–1861	Sir Edmund Walker Head
29	The Viscountess Monck (née Elizabeth Louise Mary Monck)	1861–1867	The Viscount Monck

=== Viceregal consorts of Canada, 1867–present ===
#	Name	Dates	Spouse
29	The Viscountess Monck (née Elizabeth Louise Mary Monck)	1867–1869	The Viscount Monck
30	The Lady Lisgar (née Adelaide Annabella Tuite Dalton)	1869–1872	The Lord Lisgar
31	The Marchioness of Dufferin and Ava (née Hariot Georgina Rowan-Hamilton)	1872–1878	The Marquess of Dufferin and Ava
32	The Princess Louise, Marchioness of Lorne (née The Princess Louise)	1878–1883	Marquess of Lorne
33	The Marchioness of Lansdowne (née Lady Maud Evelyn Hamilton)	1883–1888	The Marquess of Lansdowne
34	The Countess of Derby (née Lady Constance Villiers)	1888–1893	The Earl of Derby
35	The Marchioness of Aberdeen and Temair (née Ishbel Maria Marjoribanks)	1893–1898	The Marquess of Aberdeen and Temair
36	The Countess of Minto (née Mary Caroline Grey)	1898–1904	The Earl of Minto
37	The Countess Grey (née Alice Holford)	1904–1911	The Earl Grey
38	The Duchess of Connaught and Strathearn (née Princess Luise Margarete of Prussia)	1911–1916	The Duke of Connaught and Strathearn
39	The Duchess of Devonshire (née Lady Evelyn Emily Mary FitzMaurice)	1916–1921	The Duke of Devonshire
40	The Lady Byng of Vimy (née Marie Evelyn Moreton)	1921–1926	The Lord Byng of Vimy
41	The Marchioness of Willingdon (née Marie Adelaide Brassey)	1926–1931	The Marquess of Willingdon
42	The Countess of Bessborough (née Roberte de Neuflize)	1931–1935	The Earl of Bessborough
43	The Lady Tweedsmuir (née Susan Charlotte Grosvenor)	1935–1940	The Lord Tweedsmuir
44	Princess Alice, Countess of Athlone (née Princess Alice of Albany)	1940–1946	The Earl of Athlone
45	The Viscountess Alexander of Tunis (née Margaret Bingham)	1946–1952	The Viscount Alexander of Tunis
—	None (acting châtelaine: Lilias Massey) (Note: Massey's wife, Alice Massey (née Parkin), died prior to the former's appointment as governor general; his daughter-in-law, Lilias Massey, acted as Chatelaine of Rideau Hall.)	1952–1959	Vincent Massey
46	Pauline Vanier (née Archer)	1959–1967	Georges Vanier
47	Norah Michener (née Willis)	1967–1974	Roland Michener
48	Gabrielle Léger (née Carmel)	1974–1979	Jules Léger
49	Lily Schreyer (née Schulz)	1979–1984	Edward Schreyer
50	Maurice Sauvé	1984–1990	Jeanne Sauvé
51	Karen Gerda Nygaard Hnatyshyn (née Andreasen)	1990–1995	Ramon John Hnatyshyn
52	Diana Fowler LeBlanc	1995–1999	Roméo LeBlanc
53	John Ralston Saul	1999–2005	Adrienne Clarkson
54	Jean-Daniel Lafond	2005–2010	Michaëlle Jean
55	Sharon Johnston (née Downey)	2010–2017	David Lloyd Johnston
—	None (Note: Payette was divorced and had not remarried.)	2017–2021	Julie Payette
56	Whit Fraser	2021–2026	Mary Simon
—	None (Note: Arbour was previously in a common-law relationship.)	2026–present	Louise Arbour

== Canadian institutions established by viceregal consorts ==
- Lady Stanley Institute for Trained Nurses – The Countess of Derby
- Ottawa Maternity Hospital – The Marchioness of Aberdeen
- Victorian Order of Nurses – The Marchioness of Aberdeen
- Lady Minto Hospital – The Countess of Minto

== See also ==
- List of royal consorts of Canada
- King consort
- Queen consort
