= 1911 Coronation Honours =

National awards given by King George V

The Coronation Honours 1911 for the British Empire were announced on 19 June 1911, to celebrate the Coronation of George V which was held on 22 June 1911.

The honours were covered in the press at the time, including in The Times on 20 June 1911, listing the formal announcements in the London Gazette on the previous day.

The recipients of honours are displayed here as they were styled before their new honour, and arranged by honour, with classes (Knight, Knight Grand Cross, etc.) and then divisions (Military, Civil, etc.) as appropriate.

== The Order of the Crown of India ==
- Princess Victoria Elisabeth Augustine Charlotte, Hereditary Princess of Saxe-Meiningen
- Princess Victoria Patricia Helena Elizabeth of Connaught

== Order of the Garter ==
- Georges Adolphe-Frederic Auguste Victor Ernest Adalbert Gustave Guillaume Wellington, Grand Duke of Mecklenburgh-Strelitz
- John Douglas Sutherland, Duke of Argyll, KT, GCMG, GCVO
- Alexander William George, Duke of Fife, KT, GCVO

== Order of the Thistle ==
- Walter John Francis, Earl of Mar and Kellie
- Donald James, Baron Reay, GCSI, GCIE

== Order of St. Patrick ==
- Anthony, Earl of Shaftesbury, KCVO
- Field Marshal Horatio Herbert, Viscount Kitchener of Khartoum, GCB, OM, GCSI, GCIE

== Peerages ==
=== Marquess ===
- The Earl of Crewe, KG, created Marquess of Crewe

=== Earl ===
- The Lord Loreburn, created Earl Loreburn, GCMG, Lord Chancellor
- The Earl of Rosebery, KG, KT, created Earl of Midlothian
- The Lord Brassey, GCB, created Earl Brassey
- The Lord Curzon of Kedleston, GCSI, GCIE, created Earl Curzon of Kedleston

=== Viscount ===
- The Lord Elibank, created Viscount Elibank
- The Lord Knollys, GCB, GCVO, KCMG, ISO, created Viscount Knollys
- The Lord Allendale, created Viscount Allendale
- The Right Honourable Aretas Akers-Douglas, MP, created Viscount Chilston

=== Baron ===
- The Viscount Mountgarret, created Baron Mountgarret
- The Right Honourable Sir Charles Benjamin Bright McLaren, Bt., created Baron Aberconway
- The Right Honourable Sir Alexander Fuller-Acland-Hood, Bt., MP, created Baron St Audries
- Lieutenant-Colonel The Right Honourable Sir Arthur John Bigge, GCVO, KCB, KCSI, KCMG, ISO, created Baron Stamfordham
- Sir William Thomas Lewis, Bt., KCVO, created Baron Merthyr
- Sir James Lyle Mackay, GCMG, KCSI, KCIE, created Baron Inchcape
- Archibald Cameron Corbett, Esq., MP, created Baron Rowallan
- Thomas Gair Ashton, Esq., MP, created Baron Ashton of Hyde
- Godfrey Benson, Esq., created Baron Charnwood

== Knights Bachelor ==
Empire

- Charles Henry Major, Esq., Chief Justice of the Colony of Fiji, and Chief Judicial Commissioner of the Western Pacific
- Frederic Mackenzie Maxwell, Esq., Chief Justice of the Colony of British Honduras
- Edwin Arney Speed, Esq., Chief Justice of Northern Nigeria
- The Honourable Charles O′Grady Gubbins, Minister and Senator of the Union of South Africa
- The Honourable Lyman Melvin Jones, Senator of the Dominion of Canada
- The Honourable Arthur Robert Guinness, Speaker of the House of Representatives, New Zealand
- The Honourable James Tennant Molteno, KC, Speaker of the House of Assembly of the Union of South Africa
- The Honourable Frank Madden, Speaker of the Legislative Assembly, Victoria
- Thomas John Wadson, Esq., Speaker of the House of Assembly of the Bermuda Islands
- The Honourable Joshua Strange Williams, Pusine Judge of the Supreme Court, New Zealand
- The Honourable John McCall, MD, Agent-General in London for Tasmania
- The Right Honourable Allen Taylor, Lord Mayor of Sydney
- Adolphe-Basile Routhier, Esq., Judge of the Vice-Admiralty Court, Quebec
- William Whyte, Esq., Vice President of the Canadian Pacific Railway Company
- Hugh Fort, Esq., formerly Member of the Legislative Council of the Straits Settlements

== The Most Honourable Order of the Bath ==
=== Knight Grand Cross of the Order of the Bath (GCB) ===
Civil Division

- Major Prince Adolphus Charles Alexander Albert Edward George Philip Louis Ladislaus, Duke of Teck, GCVO, CMG
- Major Prince Alexander Augustus Frederick William Alfred George of Teck, GCVO, DSO
- Edward, Baron Macnaghten, GCMG
- Sir William Edward Goschen, GCMG, GCVO
- Sir Charles Inigo Thomas, KCB Permanent Secretary to the Board of Admiralty
- Sir Kenneth Augustus Muir Mackenzie, KCB, KC
- Sir Courtenay Peregrine Ilbert, KCB, KCSI, CIE

Military Division

- Admiral of the Fleet Sir Arthur Dalrymple Fanshawe, GCVO, KCB
- Admiral Sir Lewis Anthony Beaumont, KCB, KCMG
- Admiral Sir Arthur William Moore, KCB KCVO, CMG
- Admiral Sir Charles Carter Drury, GCVO, KCB, KCSI
- Admiral Sir Wilmot Hawksworth Fawkes, KCB KCVO
- Admiral Lord Charles William Delapoer Beresford, GCVO, KCB, MP
- Admiral Sir William Robert Kennedy, KCB
- Admiral Sir William Henry May, GCVO, KCB
- General Sir Archibald Hunter, KCB, DSO, Governor and Commander-in-Chief Gibraltar
- General Sir Henry John Thoroton Hildyard, KCB, Colonel, The Highland Light Infantry
- General Sir Robert MacGregor Stewart, KCB, Colonel Commandant, Royal Artillery
- General Sir Beauchamp Duff, KCB, KCSI, KCVO, CIE, Indian Army, Military Secretary, India Office
- General Sir Henry Macleod Leslie Rundle, KCB, KCMG, DSO, Colonel Commandant, Royal Artillery, Governor and Commander-in-Chief Malta
- General Sir Edward Stedman, KCB, KCIE, Unemployed Supernumerary List, Indian Army
- General Sir Charles Whittingham Horsley Douglas, KCB, General Officer Commanding-in-Chief, Southern Command

=== Knights Commander of the Order of the Bath (KCB) ===
Civil Division

- Vice-Admiral Arthur Mostyn Field, FRS
- James Alfred Ewing, CB, FRS
- James Brown Marshall, CB
- Hay Frederick Donaldson, CB, Chief Superintendent of the Royal Ordnance Factories
- Colonel Hugh, Earl Fortescue, ADC, His Majesty's Lieutenant for the County of Devonshire, President and Chairman Devonshire Territorial Force Association
- Honorary Colonel Sir George Jackson Hay, Knt, CB, CMG, late 3rd Battalion, The Prince of Wales's Own (West Yorkshire Regiment)
- Honorary Colonel Morgan George Lloyd, CB, late 3rd Battalion The Royal Irish Regiment
- Honorary Colonel William Alexander Hill, CB, late 3rd Battalion The Gloucestershire Regiment
- Colonel Edward Thomas Davenant Cotton-Jodrell, CB, Deputy Assistant Director, Territorial Force, War Office
- Colonel Thomas Sturmy Cave, CB, Brigade Commander, South Midland Infantry Brigade.
- Colonel Henry George Louis Crichton, ADC, late Brigade Commander, Hampshire Light Infantry
- Colonel Lancelot Rolleston, DSO, Brigade Commander, Notts and Derby Mounted Brigade
- Colonel Aldred Frederick George Beresford, Earl of Scarbrough, CB, ADC, Brigade Commander, Yorkshire Mounted Brigade, Chairman West Riding of Yorkshire Territorial Force Association
- Sir Frederic Fitzjames Cullinan, CB Principal Clerk of the Chief Secretary's Office, Dublin Castle
- James Stewart Davy, CB Chief Inspector, Poor Law Service
- James Miller Dodds, CB Permanent Under-Secretary, Scottish Office
- Sir Almeric William Fitzroy, KCVO
- Lieutenant-Colonel Sir Charles Arthur Andrew Frederick, GCVO
- Sir Francis Charles Gore, Solicitor to the Board of Inland Revenue
- William Graham Greene, CB assistant secretary of the Admiralty
- Frederick Arthur Hirtzel, CB
- Sir Robert Hunter, CB
- Lieutenant-Colonel Alexander Burness McHardy, CB, RE
- Sir Charles Willie Mathews
- John Paget Mellor, CB
- Horace Cecil Monro, CB Permanent Secretary, Local Government Board
- Charles Algernon Parsons, CB, LL.D
- Major Ronald Ross, CB, FRCS
- Edward Peirson Thesiger, CB Clerk to House of Lords
- Benjamin Arthur Whitelegge, CB, MD Chief Inspector of Factories

Military Division

- Admiral Henry Coey Cane, CB
- Vice-Admiral George Fowler King Hall, CVO
- Vice-Admiral Sir Alfred Wyndham Paget, KCMG
- Vice-Admiral (Acting) Sir John Rushworth Jellicoe, KCVO, CB
- Rear-Admiral Thomas Hounsom Butler Fellowes, CB
- General William Campbell, CB, RMA
- General Francis William Thomas, RMLI
- Inspector-General of Hospitals and Fleets Doyle Money Shaw, CB
- Inspector-General of Hospitals and Fleets Thomas Desmond Gimlette, CB
- Chief Inspector of Machinery James Roffey, CB
- Chief Inspector of Machinery John Harold Heffernan, CB
- Paymaster-in-Chief John Samuel Moore, CB
- Major-General Lord Ralph Drury Kerr, CB, Colonel 10th (Prince of Wales's Own Royal) Hussars
- General George Francis Beville, CB, Unemployed Supernumerary List, Indian Army
- Major-General Henry Hallam Parr, CB, CMG, Colonel, The Prince Albert's (Somersetshire Light Infantry)
- Colonel and Honorary Major-General John Palmer Brabazon, CVO, CB
- General Horace Moule Evans, CB, Unemployed Supernumerary List, Indian Army (Colonel 8th Gurkha Rifles)
- Veterinary Colonel Francis Duck, CB (Retired), late Director-General, Army Veterinary Department
- Colonel William Hugh Mortimer, CB, (Retired), late Army Pay Department
- Major-General Alfred William Lambart Bayly, CB, CSI, DSO, Indian Army (Colonel, 126th Baluchistan Infantry)
- Major-General John George Ramsay, CB, Indian Army (Colonel, 24th Punjabis), Commanding Bangalore Infantry Brigade
- Lieutenant-General John Eccles Nixon, CB, Indian Army, Commanding 1st (Pehsawar) Division
- Lieutenant-General John Plumptre Carr Glyn, Colonel Commandant, The Rifle Brigade (The Prince Consort's Own)
- Major-General George Mackworth Bullock, CB, Colonel, The Devonshire Regiment, Commanding West Riding Division, Northern Command
- Major-General Alexander Nelson Rochfort, CB, CMG, Lieutenant-Governor and Commanding the Troops, Jersey District
- Major-General Francis Lloyd, CVO, CB, DSO, Commanding Welsh Division, Western Command
- Lieutenant-General James Moncrieff Grierson, CVO, CB, CMG
- Colonel and Honorary Major-General Francis Edward Mulcahy, CB, (Retired), late Army Ordnance Department, Director of Equipment and Ordnance Stores, War Office
- Major-General Edward Owen Fisher Hamilton, CB, Lieutenant-Governor and Command the Troops, Guernsey and Alderney District
- General Sir Laurence James Oliphant, KCVO, CB, General Officer Commanding-in-Chief, Northern Command
- Lieutenant-General Frederick Walter Kitchener, CB, Governor and Commander-in-Chief, Bermuda
- Major-General John Spencer Ewart, CB, ADC General, Adjutant-General to the Forces (2nd Military Member, Army Council)
- Surgeon-General Adam Scott Reid, CB, Indian Medical Service (Retired)
- Major-General John Blaxell Woon, CB, Indian Army, Commanding 9th (Secunderabad) Division
- Lieutenant-General Charles Hamilton Des Voeux, CB, Indian Army
- Lieutenant-General Alfred Astley Pearson, CB, Indian Army, (Colonel 124th Duchess of Connaught's Own Baluchistan Infantry), Commanding 3rd (Lahore) Division
- Major-General Henry Montague Pakington Hawkes, CB, CSI, Indian Army
- Major-General Archibald James Murray, CVO, CB, DSO, Director of Military Training, War Office
- Surgeon-General William Launcelotte Gubbins, CB, MVO, KHS, Director-General, Army Medical Service
- Major-General George Barker, CB, Commanding Eastern Coast Defences, Eastern Command
- Major-General Herbert Napier Bunbury, CB

=== Companions of the Order of the Bath (CB) ===
Military division

- Rear-Admiral Arthur Henry Limpus
- Rear-Admiral Robert Hathorn Johnston Stewart, MVO
- Rear-Admiral William Lowther Grant
- Rear-Admiral David Beatty, MVO, DSO
- Rear-Admiral Ernest Charles Thomas Troubridge, CMG, MVO
- Captain Horace Lambert Alexander Hood, MVO, DSO, RN
- Captain William Osbert Boothby, MVO, RN
- Captain Roger John Brownlow Keyes, MVO
- Colonel James Henry Bor, CMG, ADC, RMA
- Lieutenant-Colonel Algernon St. Leger Burrows, RMLI
- Lieutenant-Colonel Godfrey Estcourt Matthews, RMLI
- Engineer Rear-Admiral John Stocker Sanders
- Inspector-General of Hospitals and Fleets Charles Cane Godding
- Inspector-General of Hospitals and Fleets Arthur William May
- Paymaster-in-Chief John Henry George Chapple, MVO
- Paymaster-in-Chief Francis Harrison Smith.
- Major-General Sir Charles Fergusson, Bt, MVO, DSO, Inspector of Infantry
- Surgeon-General James Gaussen MacNeece, Principal Medical Officer, 8th (Lucknow) Division, India
- Surgeon-General George Winsor Robinson, Principal Medical Officer Aldershot Command
- Colonel Robert Megaw Ireland, CMG, Army Pay Department, Chief Paymaster War Office
- Colonel (temporary Brigadier-General) Charles Rudyerd Simpson, Commanding 5th Infantry Brigade, Aldershot Command
- Colonel Samuel Charles Norton Grant, C.M.G., Director General of the Ordnance Survey.
- Colonel Anthony John Abdy, Commanding Royal Horse and Royal Field. Artillery, South Africa.
- Colonel (temporary Brigadier-General) Herman James Shelley Landon, Commanding 3rd Infantry Brigade, Aldershot Command.
- Colonel Edward John Granet, Military Attache, Rome and Berne.
- Colonel James Thomason Johnston, Half-pay.
- Colonel (temporary Brigadier-General) Francis Algernon Curteis, Commanding Western Coast Defences, Western Command.
- Colonel Charles Edward Hayries, Chief Engineer, Eastern Coast Defences, Eastern Command.
- Lieutenant-Colonel and Brevet-Colonel Hugh Pentland Shekleton, Commanding 1st Battalion, The Prince of Wales's Volunteers (South Lancashire Regiment).
- Colonel (temporary Brigadier-General) Edmund Donough John O'Brien, Commanding Potchefstroom District, South Africa.
- Colonel Arthur Dashwood Bulkeley Buckley, Assistant Adjutant General, War Office.
- Colonel Andrew Graham Thomson, Commandant(General Staff Officer, 1st grade), Royal Military Academy, Woolwich.
- Colonel Montagu Creighton Curry, D.S.O., Commanding No. 4 District, Western Command.
- Colonel (temporary Brigadier-General) Edmund John Phipps-Hornby, V.C., Commanding Royal Artillery, 4th Division, Eastern Command.
- Colonel Henry Huntly Leith Malcolm, D.S.O., Half-pay.
- Colonel John Edward Watson, Half-pay.
- Colonel Walter Norris Congreve, V.C., M.V.O., Commandant, School of Musketry, Hythe.
- Colonel (temporary Brigadier-General) William Riddell Birdwood, C.S.I., C.I.E., D.S.O., A.D.C., Indian Army, Brigade Commander, Kohat Brigade.
- Colonel Frederick Charles Almon Gilpin, Assistant Director, of Supplies and Transport, Southern Command.
- Colonel Kenneth Edward Lean, General Staff Officer, 1st grade, India.
- Lieutenant-Colonel and Brevet-Colonel the Honourable Charles Granville Fortescue, C.M.G., D.S.O., Commanding 1st Battalion, The Rifle Brigade (The Prince Consort's Own).
- Colonel (temporary Brigadier-General) George Arthur Cookson, Indian Army, Brigade Commander, Bangalore Cavalry Brigade.
- Colonel Robert Arundel Kerr Montgomery, D.S.O., General Staff Officer, 1st grade, 1st Division, Aldershot Command.
- Colonel John Fowle, Assistant Director of Remounts, War Office.
- Colonel Francis Alexander Fortescue, Brigade, Commander, Devon and Cornwall Infantry Brigade.
- Colonel Granville Roland Francis Smith, Assistant-Adjutant and Quartermaster-General, London District.
- Colonel Charles William Thompson, D.S.O., General Staff Officer, 1st grade, Western Command.
- Colonel George Mackintosh, Half-pay.
- Colonel (temporary Brigadier-General) Henry D'Urban Keary, D.S.O., A.D.C., Indian Army, Brigade Commander, Garhwal Brigade.
- Colonel (temporary Brigadier-General) Charles John Melliss, V.C., A.D.C., Indian Army, Brigade Commander, Fyzabad Brigade.
- Colonel (temporary Brigadier-General) Hugh O'Donnell, D.S.O., Indian Army, Brigade Commander, Bannu Brigade.
- Colonel (temporary Brigadier-General) Ernest Hunter Rodwell, Indian Army, Brigade Commander, Secunderabad 2nd (Infantry) Brigade.
- Colonel (temporary Brigadier-General) William Edwin Bunbury, Indian Army, General Staff, Northern Army, India.
- Colonel (temporary Brigadier-General) Philip Mainwaring Carnegy, Indian Army, Brigade Commander, Abbottabad Brigade.
- Colonel (temporary Brigadier-General) James Gibbon Turner, Indian Army, Brigade Commander, Risalpur Cavalry Brigade.
- Colonel (temporary Brigadier-General) Edmund Boteler Burton, Indian Army.
- Colonel Herbert James, Indian Army.
- Colonel St. George Loftus Steele, Indian Army, Assistant Quartermaster-General, India.
- Colonel Richard Boileau Gaisford, C.M.G., Assistant Quartermaster-General, Scottish Command.
- Colonel Richard Makdougall Brisbane Francis Kelly, D.S.O., Commanding Royal Artillery, Southern Coast Defences, Southern Command.
- Colonel Paul Rycaut Stanbury Churchward, Commanding Middlesex Infantry Brigade, Eastern Command.
- Colonel John Arthur Tanner, D.S.O., General Staff Officer, 1st grade, India.
- Colonel Claude Arthur Bray, C.M.G., Army Pay Department, Command Paymaster, Southern Command.
- Colonel (temporary Major-General) George Macaulay Kirkpatrick, Inspector-General, Military Forces, Commonwealth of Australia.
- Colonel Aylmer Gould Hunter-Weston, D.S.O., General Staff Officer, 1st grade, War Office.
- Colonel Henry Ernest Stanton, D.S.O., A.D.C., Royal Artillery.
- Colonel Hugh Gregory Fitton, D.S.O., A.D.C., Assistant Adjutant-General, Eastern Command.
- Colonel Charles Rutherford, C.M.G., Principal Veterinary Officer, India.
- Lieutenant-Colonel and Brevet Colonel George Ralph Collier Westropp, Indian Army.
- Colonel Ernest William Stewart King Maconchy, C.I.E., D.S.O., Indian Army, Deputy Secretary, Army Department, India.
- Colonel Michael Joseph Tighe, D.S.O., Indian Army.
- Colonel James Marshall Stewart, A.D.C., Indian Army.
- Colonel Robert Smeiton Maclagan, Superintending Engineer, 2nd grade, Public Works Department, India.
- Colonel Charles Fancourt Willis, Indian Medical Service, Principal-Medical Officer, 5th (Mhow) Division.
- Colonel Walter Pipon Braithwaite, Commandant (Brigadier-General, General Staff), Staff College, Quetta.
- Colonel William Cross Barratt, D.S.O., Indian Army.
- Colonel Vesey Thomas Bunbury, D.S.O., Half-pay.
- Colonel George Benjamin Hodson, D.S.O., Indian Army.
- Colonel Thomas Grainger, Indian Medical Service, Principal Medical Officer, Burma Division.
- Colonel Charles Massy Mathew, D.S.O., Assistant-Director of Ordnance Stores, Southern Command.

Civil division

- Inspector-General of Hospitals and Fleets Howard Todd
- Fleet Surgeon Percy William Bassett-Smith
- Engineer Rear-Admiral Robert Mayston
- Engineer Rear-Admiral Charles Lane
- Naval Instructor Arthur John Parish
- Robert Edmund Froude, FRS
- Arnold William Reinold, FRS
- Rear-Admiral Herbert Edward Purey-Cust
- Colonel Simeon Hardy Exham, RE
- Commander Frederick William Vibert, RNR
- Commander James Thomas Walter Charles, RNR
- Commander William Hazell, RNR
- Commander Rupert Edward Cecil Guinness, CMG, RNVR
- Commander James, Marquis of Graham, CVO, RNVR
- Commander Edward William Lloyd, RN
- Major-General John Steven Cowans, M.V.O., Director-General of the Territorial Force, War Office.
- Lieutenant-Colonel and Honorary Colonel Stephenson Robert Clarke, Commanding 3rd Battalion, The Royal Sussex Regiment.
- Colonel Robert Campbell Mackenzie, Brigade Commander, Highland Light Infantry Brigade.
- Colonel Herbert Hughes, C.M.G., Brigade Commander, 3rd West Riding Infantry Brigade.
- Colonel Peter Broome Giles, Administrative Medical Officer, 1st London Division.
- Frank Dudley Docker, Esq.
- Colonel Henry Streatfeild, M.V.O., Vice-Chairman, Kent Territorial Force Association.
- Lieutenant-Colonel James Clark, K.C., Commanding 9th (Highlanders) Battalion, The Royal Scots (Lothian Regiment), Member, City of Edinburgh Territorial Force Association.
- Colonel Sir Thomas Glen Glen-Coats, Bart., His Majesty's Lieutenant for the County of Renfrewshire, President, Renfrewshire Territorial Force Association.
- Frank Shoolbred, Esq.
- Tonman Mosley Esq., Chairman, Buckinghamshire Territorial Force Association.
- Robert Martin-Holland, Esq., Member, County of London Territorial Force Association
- Colonel Joseph Henry Russell, Baron Glanusk, D.S.O., His Majesty's Lieutenant for the County of Brecknockshire; President, Brecknockshire Territorial Force Association.
- Colonel James Edward Edmonds, General Staff Officer, 1st grade, 4th, Division, Woolwich.
- Major-General Charles Ernest Heath, C.V.O., Director of Transport and Remounts, War Office.
- Colonel Henry Capel Lofft Holden, F.R.S., Superintendent, Royal Gun and Carriage Factories, Woolwich Arsenal.
- Lieutenant-Colonel Herbert Ellison Rhodes James, F.R.C.S., Royal Army Medical Corps (Retired), attached General Staff, War Office.
- Major-General Cecil Frederick Nevil Macready, C.B. (Military), Director of Personal Services, War Office.
- Brigadier-General Frederick Rainsford-Hannay, Director of Fortifications and Works, War Office.
- Major-General Richard Matthews Ruck, Major-General in charge of Administration, Eastern Command.
- Colonel Henry Charles, Viscount Hardinge, A.D.C., Commanding 6th Battalion, The Rifle Brigade (The Prince Consort's Own).
- Lieutenant-Colonel and Honorary Colonel the Honourable William Charles Wordsworth Rollo (Master of Rollo), Commanding 3rd Battalion, The Black Watch (Royal Highlanders).
- Lieutenant-Colonel and Honorary Colonel Henry Crosbie, Commanding 3rd. Battalion, The Manchester Regiment.
- Lieutenant-Colonel and Honorary Colonel Morgan William O'Donovan (The O'Donovan), Commanding 4th Battalion, The Royal Munster Fusiliers.
- Lieutenant-Colonel and Honorary Colonel John William Merton Macartney, Commanding 2nd Battalion, The Royal Guernsey Militia.
- Lieutenant-Colonel and Honorary Colonel Reginald Barclay, Commanding 3rd Battalion, The Duke of Edinburgh's (Wiltshire Regiment).
- Lieutenant-Colonel and Honorary Colonel Charles Waring Darwin, Commanding 3rd Battalion, The Durham Light Infantry.
- Lieutenant-Colonel Henry Edzell Morgan Lindsay, Commanding Royal Monmouthshire Royal Engineers.
- Colonel George Sampson Elliston, Administrative Medical Officer, East Anglian Division.
- Lieutenant-Colonel and Honorary Colonel Robert Francis Dudgeon, late 5th Battalion, The King's Own Scottish Borderers.
- Lieutenant-Colonel and Honorary Colonel Joseph Alfred Bradney, Commanding 2nd Battalion, The Monmouthshire Regiment.
- Lieutenant-Colonel and Honorary Colonel Philip Hugh Dalbiac, Commanding 2nd London Divisional Transport and Supply Column.
- Lieutenant-Colonel and Honorary Colonel Charles Elton Longmore, Commanding 1st Battalion, The Hertfordshire Regiment.
- Lieutenant-Colonel and Honorary Colonel Edward James Moore, late 20th (County of London) Battalion, The London Regiment (Blackheath and Woolwich).
- Lieutenant-Colonel and Honorary Colonel the Honourable Henry Cubitt, Commanding Surrey (Queen Mary's Regiment) Yeomanry.
- Lieutenant-Colonel and Honorary Colonel George Milne, Commanding 1st Highland Brigade Royal Field Artillery.
- Lieutenant-Colonel and Honorary Colonel Walter Robert Ludlow, Commanding 8th Battalion, The Royal Warwickshire Regiment.
- Lieutenant-Colonel and Honorary Colonel Richard Beale Colvin, C.B. (Military), late Essex Yeomanry.
- Lieutenant-Colonel and Honorary Colonel Henry Adeane Erskine, Commanding Northumbrian Transport and Supply Column.
- Lieutenant-Colonel and Honorary Colonel James William Greig, M.P., late 14th (County of London) Battalion, The London Regiment (London Scottish).
- Lieutenant-Colonel and Honorary Colonel Thomas George Ewan, Commanding Lancashire and Cheshire Royal Garrison Artillery.
- Lieutenant-Colonel and Honorary Colonel Harry Langdon, Commanding Lancashire Fortress Royal Engineers.
- Lieutenant-Colonel and Honorary Colonel John Henry Woodward, late 4th Battalion, The Gloucestershire Regiment.
- Lieutenant-Colonel and Honorary Colonel Edward Frewen, Commanding Royal East Kent (The Duke of Connaught's Own) (Mounted Rifles) Yeomanry.
- Lieutenant-Colonel and Honorary Colonel Henry John Edwards, Cambridge University Officers Training Corps.
- Major and Honorary Lieutenant-Colonel Arthur Fanshawe Hoare, 1st Battalion, The Hertfordshire Regiment.
- Walter Edward Archer, Esq.
- Vincent Wilberforce Baddeley, Esq. Admiralty
- Rowland Bailey, Esq., M.V.O., I.S.O. Office of Works
- Ernley Robertson Hay Blackwell, Esq.
- Henry Farnham Burke, Esq., C.V.O.
- Herbert Simon Carey, Esq.
- Charles Archer Cook, Esq.
- Joseph Patrick Crowly, Esq.
- Bertram Blakiston Cubitt, Esq.
- Malcolm Delevingne, Esq.
- Alfred Hull Dennis, Esq.
- Lionel Earle, Esq., C.M.G.
- Edward George Harman, Esq.
- Charles Harris, Esq.
- Henry Frank Heath, Esq., PhD Board of Education
- Frederick George Kenyon, Esq., D.Litt.
- Stanley Leathes, Esq.
- Frederick Francis Liddell, Esq.
- Francis Herman Lucas, Esq. India Office
- Bernard Mallet, Esq.
- Charles Murray Marling, Esq., C.M.G.
- Roderick Sinclair Meiklejohn, Esq. Civil Service
- William Grenfell Max-Muller, Esq., M.V.O. Envoy to China
- Major Malcolm Donald Murray, C.V.O.
- Edward O'Farrell, Esq.
- Rear-Admiral Sir Charles Langdale Ottley, K.C.M.G.. M.V.O.
- Edward Rigg, Esq., I.S.O.
- Michael Ernest Sadler, Esq.
- William Rose Smith, Esq.
- Charles Henry Renn Stansfield, Esq. Director of Greenwich Hospital
- Sir Henry Tanner, I.S.O. Architect
- William James Dickson Walker, Esq.
- George Waller Willcocks, Esq. M.I.C.E.
- Joseph George Willis, Esq.

== Order of Merit (OM) ==
- Sir George Otto Trevelyan, Bart, LL.D, DCL
- Sir Edward Elgar, LL.D

== Order of the Star of India ==
=== Knight Grand Commander (GCSI) ===
- General Sir Dighton MacNaghten Probyn, VC, GCB, GCVO, KCSI, ISO

=== Knight Commander (KCSI) ===
- Krishna Govinda Gupta, CSI, Member of the Council of India

== Order of Saint Michael and Saint George ==
=== Knight Grand Cross (GCMG) ===
- Lord Denman, PC, KCVO, Governor-General and Commander-in-Chief designate of the Commonwealth of Australia
- Sir George Houston Reid, KCMG, High Commissioner in London for the Commonwealth of Australia
- Sir Charles Fitzpatrick, KCMG, Chief Justice of Canada
- Sir Richard Solomon, KCB, KCMG, KCVO, High Commissioner in London for the Union of South Africa
- Colonel Sir Frederick John Dealtry Lugard, KCMG, CB, DSO, Governor and Commander-in-Chief of the Colony of Hong Kong
- Sir Gerard Augustus Lowther, KCMG, CB, His Majesty's Ambassador Extraordinary and Plenipotentiary at Constantinople
- Sir Eldon Gorst, KCB, His Majesty's Agent and Consul-General in Egypt, Minister Plenipotentiary in His Majesty's Diplomatic Service

=== Knight Commander (KCMG) ===
- Sir John Michael Fleetwood Fuller, Bart, Governor of the State of Victoria
- James Carroll, Native Minister and Minister of Stamp Duties of the Dominion of New Zealand
- John George Findlay, KC, LL.D, Attorney-General of the Dominion of New Zealand
- Sir Perceval Maitland Laurence, LL.D, Puisne Judge of the Cape of Good Hope Provincial Division of the Supreme Court of South Africe, in recognition of services as Chairman of the Delimitation Commission under the South Africa Act, 1909
- Hartmann Wolfgang Just, CB, CMG, Assistant Under-Secretary of State, Colonial Office and Secretary to the Imperial Conference
- Rear-Admiral William Rooke Creswell, CMG, Director of Naval Forces of the Commonwealth of Australia
- John Pringle, MB, CMG, Member of the Privy and Legislative Councils of the Island of Jamaica
- Major-General John Charles Hoad, CMG, Chief of the General Staff of the Military Forces of the Commonwealth of Australia
- Colonel David Harris, CMG, Member of the House of Assembly of the Union of South Africa
- Herbert Cecil Sloley, CMG, Resident Commissioner, Basutoland
- Frederick James Clark, CMG, Member of the Executive Council and Speaker of the House of Assembly of the Island of Barbados
- John Rose Bradford, MD, D.Sc, a secretary to the Royal Society
- Reginald Thomas Tower, CVO, His Majesty's Envoy Extraordinary and Minister Plenipotentiary at Buenos Ayres
- Walter Beaupré Townley, His Majesty's Envoy Extraordinary and Minister Plenipotentiary at Bucharest
- Henry Bax-Ironside, His Majesty's Envoy Extraordinary and Minister Plenipotentiary at Sofia
- Reginald Lister, CVO. His Majesty's Envoy Extraordinary and Minister Plenipotentiary at Tangier

Honorary

- Abdul Hamid Halimshah ibni Adhmat Tajudin, Sultan of Kedah
- Zainul-ab-din ibni Marhum Ahmad, Sultan of Terengganu

=== Companion (CMG) ===
- Captain Cecil Hamilton Armitage, D.S.O., Chief Commissioner of the Northern Territories of the Gold Coast.
- Chewton Atchley, Esq., I.S.O., Librarian, Colonial Office.
- James William Barrett, Esq., M.D., Member of the Council and Lecturer of the University of Melbourne.
- Marcus Henry De la Poer Beresford, Esq., I.S.O., late Secretary to the Administration, Northern Nigeria.
- Arthur Winbolt Brewin, Esq., Registrar-General of the Colony of Hong Kong.
- Henry William Frederick Nottingham Brodhurst, Esq., Government Agent, Western Province of the Island of Ceylon.
- Robert Gervase Bushe, Esq., Auditor General of the Colony of Trinidad and Tobago.
- Lieutenant Herbert Alexander Child, R.N., Director of Marine, Southern Nigeria.
- Arthur Ernest Collins, Esq., Principal Clerk, Colonial Office.
- Colonel Robert Joseph Collins, I.S.O., Comptroller and Auditor-General, Dominion of New Zealand.
- William Sayer Comissiong, Esq., Member of the Executive and Legislative Councils of the Island of Grenada.
- Robert Thorne Coryndon, Esq., Resident Commissioner, Swaziland.
- Lieutenant-Colonel Wilfred Bennett Davidson-Houston, Commissioner of the Presidency of Montserrat.
- Robert Alexander Falconer, Esq., M.A.., LL.D., D.Litt., President of the University of Toronto.
- Frederick Fitchett, Esq., LL.D., M.A., Public Trustee, Dominion of New Zealand.
- Edward Thomas Grannum, Esq., Auditor-General of the Island of Barbados.
- Henry Eugene Walter Grant, Esq., Colonial Secretary of the Leeward Islands.
- Alfred Claud Hollis, Esq., Secretary for Native Affairs, East Africa Protectorate.
- Eyre Hutson, Esq., Colonial Secretary of the Colony of Fiji.
- Charles Canniff James, Esq., Deputy Minister of Agriculture for the Province of Ontario.
- Benjamin Howell Jones, Esq., Member of the Executive Council and Court of Policy of the Colony of British Guiana.
- Carlos Melhado, Esq., Member of the Executive Council of the Colony of British Honduras.
- Roland Lyons Nosworthy Michell, Esq., Commissioner of Limassol, Cyprus.
- Alan Hay Milne, Esq., Secretary to the Incorporated Liverpool School of Tropical Medicine.
- Joseph Armand Patron, Esq., Chairman of the Gibraltar Exchange Committee.
- Howard Lloyd Pryce, Esq., Travelling Commissioner in the Gambia.
- Robert Archibald Ranking, Esq., First Police Magistrate of the State of Queensland.
- Henry Nicholas Ridley, Esq., M.A., Director of Gardens and Forests, Straits Settlements.
- Lionel Henry Sholl, Esq., I.S.O., Under Secretary and Government Statist of the State of South Australia.
- Adam Shortt, Esq., M.A., Civil Service Commissioner, Dominion of Canada.
- Arthur French Sladen, Esq., Private Secretary to the Governor-General of the Dominion of Canada.
- George Smith, Esq., Colonial Secretary of the Colony of Mauritius.
- Henry Richard Wallis, Esq., Assistant Deputy-Governor, Nyasaland Protectorate.
- Reginald George Watson, Esq., British Resident, Selangor, Federated Malay States.
- The Honourable Frank Wilson, Premier and Colonial Treasurer of the State of Western Australia.
- Temistocle Zammit, Esq., M.D., Government Analyst, Public Health Department of the Island of Malta.
- Edward Thomas Frederick Crowe, Esq., Commercial attaché to His Majesty's Embassy at Tokio.
- Captain Edward Colpoys Midwinter, late R.E., D.S.O., Director of the Soudan Government Railways.
- Dugald Christie, Esq., F.R.C.P., L.R.C.S., Head of the Medical Missionaries in China.
- Commander Bertram Sackville Thesiger, of His Majesty's Navy.

== Royal Victorian Order ==
=== Knights Grand Cross (GCVO) ===
- Prince Alexander of Battenberg, KCVO
- The Earl of Chesterfield
- Earl Spencer
- Lord Revelstoke
- Sir Schomberg Kerr McDonnell, KCB, CVO
- Lieutenant-Colonel Sir William Carington, KCVO, CB
- Sir Edward Henry, KCB, KCVO, CSI
- Colonel Sir Douglas Dawson, KCVO, CMG

=== Knights Commander of the Royal Victorian Order (KCVO) ===
- Prince Leopold Arthur Louis of Battenberg
- Prince Maurice Victor Donald of Battenberg
- Captain William Charles Wentworth Fitzwilliam, CVO
- Commander Sir Charles Leopold Cust, Bart, CB, CMG, CIE, MVO, RN
- Sir Alfred Scott Scott-Gatty, CVO, (Garter Principal King of Arms)
- Sir Rufus Daniel Isaacs, KC, MP
- Sir John Allsebrook Simon, KC, MP
- Canon John Neale Dalton, CVO, CMG
- Henry David Erskine, CVO
- Major-General Alfred Edward Codrington, CVO, CB
- William Patrick Byrne, CB
- Major Edwin Frederick Wodehouse, CB
- Bertram Dawson, MD

=== Commanders of the Royal Victorian Order (CVO) ===
- The Rt Rev Herbert Edward Ryle, D.D., Dean of Westminster.
- Vaughan Nash, Esq., C.B.
- Captain Bryan Godfrey Godfrey-Faussett, C.M.G., M.V.O., R.N.
- Fleet Surgeon Arthur Reginald Bankart, M.V.O., R.N.
- Walter Reginald Baker, Esq.
- Charles Hubert Montgomery, Esq.
- Milsom Rees, Esq., F.R.C.S.Edin.
- Mayo Robson, Esq., D.Sc., F.R.C.S.
- Colonel Granville Ronald Francis Smith

=== Members of the Fourth Class of the Royal Victorian Order (MVO) ===
- Major the Lord Charles George Francis FitzMaurice
- Henry Peter Hansell, Esq., M.V.O. (5th Class)
- Charles Harold Athill, Esq. (Richmond Herald)
- Marcellus Purnell Castle, Esq..
- Arthur William Steuart Cochrane, Esq. (Rouge Croix).
- William Fairbank, Esq., M.R.C.S.
- The Rev Frederick Percival Farrar
- William Francis Fladgate, Esq.
- Capt Houston French
- Frederick Morris Fry, Esq.
- James Fetherstonhaugh Hamilton, Esq.
- Lieut-Col Herbert Alexander St. John Mildmay
- Colonel Arthur Allen Owen
- Walter Peacock, Esq.

=== Members of the Fifth Class of the Royal Victorian Order (MVO) ===
- Walter Alcock, Esq., Mus.Doc.
- Ernest Henry Bright, Esq.
- Clifford Longden, Esq.
- Campbell Gerald Hertslet MacGill, Esq.
- Thomas Moore, Esq.
- Francis John Sims, Esq.
- Herbert Arthur Previté Trendell, Esq.
- Creswell Wells, Esq.
- Tansley Witt, Esq.

== Imperial Service Order ==
- William Carver Gordon Arrowsmith, Esq., Chief Clerk, Audit Office, Island of Jamaica.
- Frederick Morewood Ashley, Esq., Chief Clerk in the Department of the Commissioners for the Reduction of the National Debt.
- William Nicholas Atkinson, Esq., Divisional Inspector of Mines, Home Office.
- Frederick Barley, Esq., Chief Staff Officer, Board of Trade.
- Richard Barton, Esq., Superintendent of Demands, Stationery Office.
- William Lewis Berrow, Esq., Registrar, Foreign Office.
- Horatio John Hooper Blow, Esq., Under Secretary for Public Works and Mines, Dominion of New Zealand.
- John Bould, Esq., Sub-Inspector of Schools, Board of Education.
- David Brown, Esq., Assistant Secretary, Local Government Board for Scotland.
- Jeffrey Browning, Esq., Assistant Secretary, Customs and Excise.
- Nigel Bruce Burnside, Esq., Auditor of Public Accounts, Bahama Islands.
- William Henry Aglionby Burrowes, Esq., Commissary of Taxation, Colony of British Guiana.
- Frank Stewart Checkley, Esq.; Chief of School Lands Branch, .Department of the Interior, Dominion of Canada.
- Narcisse Omer Cote, Esq., Chief of Land Patents Branch, Department of the Interior, Dominion of Canada.
- William Andrew Cuscaden, Esq., Inspector-General of Police, Straits Settlements.
- Eusebio Horiorato d'Aquino, Esq., First Clerk, Stamp Office, Colony of Hong Kong.
- William Davidson, Esq., Inspector General of Public' Works of the. State.. of Victoria.
- John Alfred Ernst Dickinson, Esq., Comptroller of Housing and Town Planning, Local Government Board.
- Edward David Dobbie, Esq., Solicitor-General and Crown Solicitor; State of Tasmania.
- John Macrae Ferguson, Esq., Collector of Customs and Excise, Edinburgh.
- Frederick George Fray ling, Esq., First Class Clerk in the Office of the Director of Public Prosecutions.
- Charles Thomas Griffin, Esq., lately Assistant Principal Civil Medical Officer and Inspector-General of Hospitals, Island of Ceylon.
- Charles Edgar Hewlett, Esq., Principal Clerk, Office of Woods.
- Thomas Fair Husband, Esq., Chief Clerk, Board of Agriculture and Fisheries.
- Edward Odium Johnson, Esq., Colonial Treasurer, Colony of Sierra Leone.
- James William Jones, Esq., Secretary, Office of the Commissioner of Public Works, and Chairman, Supply and Tender Board, State of South Australia.
- John Charles King., Esq., Assistant Colonial Secretary, Gibraltar.
- John Mackay, Esq., Portmaster, Harbour Master and Chairman of the Marine Board, State of Queensland.
- Clayton Turner Mason, Esq., late Collector of Customs (Western Australia), Department of Trade and Customs, Commonwealth of Australia.
- George Morgan, Esq., Controller of Stores, General Post Office.
- Alfred Young Nutt, Esq., M.V.O., Architect, Office of Works.
- Michael Pithie, Esq., Chief Clerk in the Law Department of the Inland Revenue Office, Edinburgh.
- William Henry Porter, Esq., Treasurer, Presidency of Dominica.
- William George Roff, Esq., Inspector of Dockyard Accounts, Admiralty.
- Francis Salisbury, Esq., ' Postmaster Surveyor, General Post Office, Liverpool.
- Sidney Smith, Esq., Controller of Postal Stores, Post Office Department, Dominion of Canada.
- William Smith, Esq., Secretary and Archivist, Post Office Department, Dominion of Canada.
- Thomas Talbot, Esq., late Chief Valuer, General Valuation and Boundary Survey of Ireland.
- Harry Travis, Esq., Superintending Engineer and Constructor of Shipping, Royal Arsenal.
- Edward Tregear, Esq., lately Secretary, Department of Labour, Dominion of New Zealand.
- Charles William Annesley Trollope, Esq., Principal Clerk, Exchequer and Audit Department.
- Edward Henry Silberstein Von Arnheim, Esq., Deputy Master of the Royal Mint, Sydney.

== Royal Red Cross ==
- Head Sister Miss Margaret Helen Keenan, Queen Alexandra's Royal Naval Nursing Service
- Head Sister Miss Katherine Mary Hickley, Queen Alexandra's Royal Naval Nursing Service
