= Secretary to the Governor General of Canada =

Head of the Office of the Secretary to the Governor General

Secretary to the Governor General
- Secrétaire du gouverneur général
- Incumbent; Ken MacKillop since November 27, 2023
- Office of the Secretary to the Governor General
- Seat: Rideau Hall, Ottawa, Ontario
- Appointer: Governor General of Canada
- Formation: 1867 (Confederation)
- First holder: Dennis Godley
- Website: Official website

In Canada, the secretary to the governor general (French: secrétaire du gouverneur général) is the administrative head of the Office of the Secretary to the Governor General of Canada (OSGG), the Canadian federal government office that supports the work of the governor general. The position is based at Rideau Hall in Ottawa, Ontario.

On November 20, 2023, Ken MacKillop was named to the position, effective November 27, 2023. He succeeded Ian McCowan, who was appointed in February 2021 and retired in November 2023.

== Overview ==
The coat of arms and batons of office of the secretary when executing their duties as Herald Chancellor of Canada

The position is one of the oldest public service appointments, the position initially supporting the governor-general of the Province of Canada. It holds the courtesy rank of deputy minister within the Public Service of Canada. Since Confederation, every office-holder has been appointed by order-in-council. The first post-Confederation incumbent, Dennis Godley, initially assumed his post in 1861 and continued into the post-Confederation period, departing in November 1868.

The Secretary to the Governor General holds a number of ex officio positions, as follows. Since the establishment of the Order of Canada in 1967, the office-holder has served as Secretary General of the Order of Canada. The office-holder also serves as Secretary General of the Order of Military Merit and the Order of Merit of the Police Forces. Following the creation of the Canadian Heraldic Authority in 1988, the office-holder became Herald Chancellor of Canada.

== Secretaries to the Governor General ==
=== Pre-Confederation ===
- 1841–1842: Thomas Willian Clinton Murdoch
- 1842–1844: Rawson W. Rawson
- 1842–1843: Henry Bagot (private secretary)
- 1843–1846: James Macaulay Higginson (private secretary)
- 1847–1849: Thomas Edmund Campbell
- 1851–1854: Robert Bruce
- 1854–1854: Laurence Oliphant
- 1854–1856: William Keppel, Viscount Bury
- 1856–1861: Richard T. Pennefather
- 1861–1861: Francis Retallack (acting secretary)
- 1861–1867: Dennis Godley

=== Post-Confederation ===
- 1867–1868: Dennis Godley
- 1868–1872: Francis Turville
- 1872–1875: Lt.-Col. Henry Charles Fletcher
- 1875 (March–October): Harry Moody
- 1875–1878: Edward George Percy Littleton
- 1878–1883: Francis W. de Winton
- 1883–1885: Viscount Melgund (later 4th Earl of Minto)
- 1885–1888: Henry Streatfeild
- 1888 (June–July): Josceline FitzRoy Bagot
- 1888–1892: C. R. W. Colville
- 1892–1893: J. T. St. Aubyn
- 1893–1899: Arthur John Lewis Gordon
- 1899–1926: Arthur French Sladen
- 1926–1927: Richard Osborne
- 1927–1931: Sir Eric Miéville
- 1931–1935: Sir Alan Lascelles
- 1935–1946: Sir Arthur Shuldham Redfern
- 1946–1952: Harry Letson
- 1952–1959: Lionel Massey
- 1959–1985: Esmond Unwin Butler
- 1985–1990: Léopold Henri Amyot
- 1990–2000: Judith A. LaRocque
- 2000–2006: Barbara Uteck
- 2006–2011: Sheila-Marie Cook
- 2011–2018: Stephen Wallace
- 2018–2021: Assunta di Lorenzo
- 2021–2023: Ian McCowan
- 2023–present: Ken MacKillop

== See also ==
- Canadian Secretary to the King
- Herald Chancellor of Canada
