= George Hodson =

George Hodson may refer to:

- George Hodson (baseball), baseball pitcher
- George Hodson (priest) (1788–1855), Archdeacon of Stafford 1829–1855
- George Stacey Hodson (1899–1976), English World War I flying ace
- George Benjamin Hodson (1863–1916), British Indian Army officer
- Sir George Frederick John Hodson, 3rd Baronet (1806–1888) of the Hodson baronets

== See also ==
- Hodson (disambiguation)
