= Alan Lascelles =

British Army officer and courtier (1887–1981)

The Right Honourable Sir Alan Lascelles GCB GCVO CMG MC PC
- Lascelles in 1943

Private Secretary to the Sovereign
- In office 1943–1953
- Monarchs: George VI; Elizabeth II
- Preceded by: Sir Alexander Hardinge
- Succeeded by: Sir Michael Adeane

Assistant Private Secretary to the Sovereign
- In office 1935–1943
- Monarchs: George V; Edward VIII; George VI

Secretary to the Governor General of Canada
- In office 1931–1935
- Governor General: The Earl of Bessborough
- Preceded by: Sir Eric Miéville
- Succeeded by: Shuldham Redfern

Personal details
- Born: 11 April 1887 Sutton Waldron, Dorset, England, UK
- Died: 10 August 1981 (aged 94) Kensington, London, England, UK
- Spouse: Joan Frances Vere Thesiger (m. 1920; died 1971)
- Children: 3
- Relatives: Henry Lascelles, 4th Earl of Harewood (grandfather); Sir Adolphus Liddell (grandfather)
- Education: Marlborough College
- Alma mater: Trinity College, Oxford (BA)

Military service
- Allegiance: United Kingdom
- Branch/service: British Army
- Years of service: 1913–1938
- Rank: Captain
- Unit: Bedfordshire Yeomanry
- Battles/wars: First World War: Western Front
- Awards: Military Cross

Sir Alan Frederick "Tommy" Lascelles (/ˈlæsəls/ LASS-əlss; 11 April 1887 – 10 August 1981) was a British soldier, courtier and civil servant who was Private Secretary to George VI and Elizabeth II from 1943 to 1953. In 1950, he wrote the Lascelles Principles in a letter to the editor of The Times, using the pen-name "Senex".

== Early life and education ==
Alan Frederick Lascelles was born on 11 April 1887 in the village of Sutton Waldron in Dorset, England, the sixth and youngest child and only surviving son of Commander Frederick Canning Lascelles and Frederica Maria Liddell, and the grandson of Henry Lascelles, 4th Earl of Harewood. He was thus a cousin of Henry Lascelles, 6th Earl of Harewood, who married Mary, Princess Royal, sister of his employers, Edward VIII and George VI. His mother was the daughter of Sir Adolphus Liddell, son of Thomas Liddell, 1st Baron Ravensworth.

After attending Marlborough College, he studied classics at Trinity College, Oxford, graduating with a second-class degree in 1908. In the First World War, Lascelles served in France with the Bedfordshire Yeomanry, where he rose to the rank of captain and was awarded the Military Cross, after which he became aide-de-camp to his brother-in-law Lord Lloyd, the Governor of Bombay from 1919 to 1920.

== Career ==
Lascelles returned to Britain and was appointed Assistant Private Secretary to Edward, Prince of Wales in 1920, serving in that role until resigning in 1929, citing differences with the prince. From 1931 to 1935, he was Secretary to the Governor General of Canada, Vere Ponsonby, 9th Earl of Bessborough.

Lascelles became the Assistant Private Secretary to George V in the latter months of 1935. When the Prince of Wales ascended the throne as Edward VIII on the death of George V in January 1936, Lascelles served briefly as the new King's Assistant Private Secretary, although he never saw the King during this phase. He soldiered on through Edward's short reign and the protracted crisis of the abdication in 1936. He was "deeply shocked" by the abdication, not dreaming until it was announced that it would happen, and the evening he heard of it "he was so stunned that he went out and walked 3 times round St James Park in the darkness, thinking of James II." Lascelles became Assistant Private Secretary to George VI, some time after the new king's accession.

Lascelles was made a Knight Commander of the Royal Victorian Order (KCVO) by George VI during the 1939 royal tour of Canada, which he had helped to arrange and manage. The title is an honour given as a personal gift by the sovereign and does not require political approval. He had been appointed a Companion of the Order of the Bath in 1937, was promoted to Knight Commander of the Order of the Bath in 1944, and to Knight Grand Cross on his retirement in 1953. He had been appointed a Member of the Royal Victorian Order in 1926, before his promotion to Knighthood in that Order in 1939. He was made a Companion of the Order of St Michael and St George in 1933. He was sworn of the Privy Council, entitling him to the prefix "Right Honourable", in 1943.

In 1943, Lascelles was promoted from Assistant Private Secretary to George VI to his Private Secretary, after effecting the forced resignation of Alec Hardinge, and served until the King died in 1952. In 1952, he became Private Secretary to Elizabeth II, a role he held until the end of 1953, overseeing the early days of her reign and the Coronation. Lascelles was also Keeper of the Royal Archives from 1943 to 1953.

He retired from his 27 years of royal service on the last day of 1953, at the age of 66. He had been asked by then Prime Minister Sir Winston Churchill twice and by the Queen once whether he would like to go to the House of Lords with a hereditary peerage, but he declined. He did, however, accept appointment as a Knight Grand Cross of the Order of the Bath, which, he said, "rated much higher than a peerage".

In 1955, Lascelles was very supportive of James Pope-Hennessy's commission to write an official biography of Queen Mary, although initially he wondered why and by whom this unknown young writer had been commissioned. Lascelles was a crucial witness for many key events (e.g., the abdication of Edward VIII). When the book passed the royal censors, Lascelles was livid that Pope-Hennessy phoned him with the news rather than coming round with the good news in person.

Lascelles's papers are now held in the Churchill Archives Centre at Churchill College, Cambridge.

== Personal life and death ==
On 16 March 1920, Lascelles married Joan Frances Vere Thesiger (1895–1971), daughter of Frederic Thesiger, 1st Viscount Chelmsford, a former Viceroy of India and First Lord of the Admiralty.

They had three children:

- John Frederick Lascelles, born 11 June 1922, died 11 September 1951.
- Lavinia Joan Lascelles, born 27 June 1923, died 3 November 2020; married to Major Edward Westland Renton, divorced 1960, then 1962–64 to the writer Gavin Maxwell, and to David Hankinson in 1969.
- Caroline Mary Lascelles, born 15 February 1928, died 12 June 2024; married 1949 to Antony Lyttelton, 2nd Viscount Chandos; then 1985 to David Erskine, son of Lord Erskine.

Lascelles died on 10 August 1981 at Kensington Palace at the age of 94.

== Honours and awards ==
Knight Grand Cross of the Order of the Bath (GCB)	
Knight Grand Cross of the Royal Victorian Order (GCVO)	
Companion of the Order of St Michael and St George (CMG)	
Military Cross (MC)	(1919)
1914–15 Star	
British War Medal	
Victory Medal	with palm for Mentioned in Dispatches
King George V Silver Jubilee Medal	(1935)
King George VI Coronation Medal	(1937)
Queen Elizabeth II Coronation Medal	(1953)
Grand Officer of the Legion of Honour	(France)

== In popular culture ==
Lascelles is portrayed by Paul Brooke in the 2002 film Bertie and Elizabeth and Pip Torrens in the 2016 Netflix series The Crown.

== Bibliography ==
- Lascelles, Alan (1986). Hart-Davis, Duff (ed.). End of an Era, 1887–1920. The Letters and Journals of Sir Alan Lascelles. Vol. 1. London: Hamish Hamilton. ISBN 978-0-241-11960-0.
- ——— (1989). Hart-Davis, Duff (ed.). In Royal Service, 1920–1936. The Letters and Journals of Sir Alan Lascelles. Vol. 2. London: Hamish Hamilton. ISBN 978-0-241-12562-5.
- ——— (2006). Hart-Davis, Duff (ed.). King's Counsellor: Abdication and War: The Diaries of Tommy Lascelles. London: Weidenfeld & Nicolson. ISBN 978-0-297-85155-4.
- James Pope-Hennessy, edited and with text by Hugo Vickers, The Quest for Queen Mary (Hodder & Stoughton, 2018) ISBN 978-1-529-33062-5.

== Sources ==
- Pope-Hennessy, James (2018). Vickers, Hugo (ed.). The Quest for Queen Mary.
- Prochaska, Frank (2004). "Lascelles, Sir Alan Frederick (1887-1981), Courtier". In Matthew, H. C. G.; Harrison, Brian; Goldman, Lawrence (eds.). Oxford Dictionary of National Biography. Oxford University Press. doi:10.1093/ref:odnb/31334. ISBN 978-0-19-861412-8.

Lascelles, Rt. Hon. Sir Alan Frederick, (11 April 1887–10 Aug. 1981), Past Director: The Midland Bank; Royal Academy of Music; Private Secretary to the Queen, 1952–53; Keeper of the Queen's Archives, 1952–53 (of the King's Archives, 1943–52), doi.org/10.1093/ww/9780199540884.013.U166201 Who's Who

Government offices
Preceded by Sir Eric Miéville	Secretary to the Governor General of Canada; 1931–1935	Succeeded by Shuldham Redfern
Court offices
Preceded by Sir Alexander Hardinge	Private Secretary to the Sovereign; 1943–1953	Succeeded by Michael Adeane
