= Charles Harris (civil servant) =

Civil servant in the British War Office

Sir Charles Harris GBE KCB

Joint Secretary to the War Office
- In office 1920–1924

Assistant Financial Secretary to the War Office
- In office 1908–1924

Personal details
- Born: 2 March 1864 Ivybridge, Devon, England
- Died: 10 June 1943 (aged 79)

Sir Charles Harris (2 March 1864 – 10 June 1943) was a senior civil servant in the British War Office.

Harris was born in Ivybridge, Devon, and was educated at Bradford Grammar School and Balliol College, Oxford. He joined the War Office in 1887, being promoted to Principal Clerk in 1900 and Assistant Financial Secretary, in charge of the Finance Department, in 1908. He held the latter position until his retirement in 1924, also being Joint Secretary to the War Office from 1920.

Harris was appointed Companion of the Order of the Bath (CB) in the 1911 Coronation Honours, Knight Commander of the Order of the Bath (KCB) in 1913, and Knight Grand Cross of the Order of the British Empire (GBE) in the 1920 civilian war honours.

Government offices
Preceded by First incumbent	Assistant Financial Secretary, War Office; 1908–1924	Succeeded by Unknown
Preceded by Sir Herbert Creedy	Joint Secretary to the War Office; With Sir Herbert Creedy; 1920–1924	Succeeded by Sir Herbert Creedy (Permanent Under-Secretary of State for War)
