= Stephen Wallace (public servant) =

Canadian retired civil servant

Stephen Wallace CVO is a Canadian retired civil servant. On 1 February 2011, he became Secretary to the Governor General of Canada and Herald Chancellor of Canada. On 1 November 2011, he received his commission as Deputy of the Governor General of Canada. He retired from public service in January 2018.

Wallace is a recipient of the 125th Anniversary of the Confederation of Canada Medal, and he was made a Commander of the Royal Victorian Order in the 2018 New Year Honours.

== Life and career ==
One of nine children from a naval family originating in the Atlantic provinces, Wallace grew up in Halifax and Ottawa, and his family is now centered near Wakefield, Quebec. He studied the arts and business administration at the University of Ottawa.

Wallace focused much of his career on international affairs and public administration. His early work as a teacher, volunteer, diplomat and aid worker concentrated mainly on Africa and Central America. Wallace spent many years with the Canadian International Development Agency, where he managed several reconstruction programs and served as the Vice-President of the Afghanistan Task Force.

His public policy assignments included the Special Joint Committee of Parliament Reviewing Canadian Foreign Policy, as well as work on civil society with the Organisation for Economic Co-operation and Development. As a senior public servant, Wallace served as Assistant Secretary of Government Operations at the Treasury Board Secretariat, and most recently as Associate Deputy Minister for the Department of Canadian Heritage prior to his appointment as Secretary to the Governor General.
