= Léopold Henri Amyot =

Canadian diplomat

Léopold Henri Amyot CVO FRHSC(hon)

Secretary to the Governor General of Canada
- In office 1988–1990
- Governor General: Jeanne Sauvé
- Preceded by: Esmond Unwin Butler
- Succeeded by: Judith A. LaRocque

Herald Chancellor of Canada
- In office 1988–1990

Canadian Ambassador to Morocco
- In office 13 October 1983 – 1985
- Monarch: Elizabeth II
- Prime Minister: Pierre Trudeau; John Turner; Brian Mulroney
- Preceded by: Gilles Horace J. Duguay
- Succeeded by: Esmond Unwin Butler

Canadian Ambassador Extraordinary and Plenipotentiary to Iraq
- In office 10 June 1974 – 1977
- Monarch: Elizabeth II
- Prime Minister: Pierre Trudeau
- Preceded by: Jacques Gilles Bruno Gignac
- Succeeded by: William Jones

Canadian Ambassador Extraordinary and Plenipotentiary to Jordan
- In office 10 June 1974 – 31 May 1977
- Monarch: Elizabeth II
- Prime Minister: Pierre Trudeau
- Preceded by: Jacques Gilles Bruno Gignac
- Succeeded by: Alan William Sullivan (As Chargé d'Affaires)

Canadian Ambassador Extraordinary and Plenipotentiary to Lebanon
- In office 10 June 1974 – 7 January 1976
- Monarch: Elizabeth II
- Prime Minister: Pierre Trudeau
- Preceded by: Jacques Gilles Bruno Gignac
- Succeeded by: Alan William Sullivan (As Chargé d'Affaires)

4th Canadian Ambassador Extraordinary and Plenipotentiary to Syria
- In office 10 June 1974 – 7 January 1976
- Monarch: Elizabeth II
- Prime Minister: Pierre Trudeau
- Preceded by: Jacques Gilles Bruno Gignac
- Succeeded by: Alan William Sullivan (As Chargé d'Affaires)

Personal details
- Occupation: Diplomat, Civil Servant

Léopold Henri Amyot is a former Canadian diplomat and civil servant. During his diplomatic his career, he served as the Canadian Ambassador Extraordinary and Plenipotentiary to Iraq, Jordan, Lebanon, Syria and Morocco. He served as Secretary to the Governor General of Canada and Herald Chancellor of Canada from 1988 to 1990.

== Coat of arms ==
Coat of arms of Léopold Henri Amyot
Notes Granted 28 March 1989. Crest A demi-lion rampant Or bearing in the dexter paw the Baton of Office of the Herald Chancellor of the Canadian Heraldic Authority and under the sinister paw an escutcheon charged with the Arms of Office of the Herald Chancellor. Escutcheon Per fess ogivy Or and Azure in chief semé of maple leaves Gules in base semé of fleurs-de-lys Or. Supporters Upon a compartment composed of waves of the sea ensigning a representation of the rose window of Chartres Cathedral Proper between on the dexter land bearing fir saplings Proper and on the sinister sand Proper charged from the dexter to the sinister of the star of Iraq the star of Morocco the star of Syria all Vert and of the star of Jordan Argent and bearing a cedar of Lebanon sapling Proper dexter a bison Argent accorné and unguled Gules gorged with a collar of maple leaves Gules sinister a bison Argent accorné and unguled Azure gorged with a representation of a traditional Moroccan charafa frieze Vert and Sable. Motto Labor Fidentia (Latin for 'Work Self-Confidence')
