= Judith A. LaRocque =

Canadian civil servant

Judith A. LaRocque CVO

Canadian Ambassador and Permanent Representative to the OECD
- In office 17 January 2011 – c. 2015
- Preceded by: Paul-Henri Lapointe
- Succeeded by: Michelle d'Auray

3rd Deputy Minister of Canadian Heritage
- In office May 13, 2002 – October 11, 2011
- Minister: Sheila Copps; Hélène Scherrer; Liza Frulla; Bev Oda; Josée Verner; James Moore
- Preceded by: Alex Himelfarb
- Succeeded by: Daniel Jean

Secretary to the Governor General of Canada
- In office 1990–2000
- Governors General: Ray Hnatyshyn; Roméo LeBlanc; Adrienne Clarkson
- Preceded by: Léopold Henri Amyot
- Succeeded by: Barbara Uteck

Personal details
- Born: 27 September 1956
- Died: 29 December 2021 (aged 65)
- Education: Carleton University
- Occupation: Civil servant

Judith Anne LaRocque CVO (born 27 September 1956 and died 29 December 2021) was a senior Canadian civil servant. Most notably, she served as Secretary to the Governor General of Canada and Herald Chancellor of Canada from 1990 until 2000. Since 2010, she has been Canada's Ambassador and Permanent Representative at the Organisation for Economic Co-operation and Development in Paris. She died on December 29, 2021.

== Education ==
LaRocque received an Honours Bachelor of Arts degree in political science from Carleton University in 1979. She received a Master of Arts degree in Public Administration from the same university in 1992.

== Career ==
In 1979, LaRocque began her career as an Administrative Assistant with the Public Service Commission of Canada. Shortly afterwards, she became a Writer and Researcher at the Prime Minister's Office. From 1980 until 1982, she was a Special Assistant at the Office of the Leader of the Opposition.

In 1982, she became a Procedural Officer and Committee Clerk at the House of Commons, a position she held until 1984. From 1984 until 1985, she served as Legislative Assistant to the Government House Leader. She then dealt with House Affairs at the Office of the President of the Queen's Privy Council for Canada until 1986.

From 1986 until 1989, she served as the Executive Assistant to the Minister of Justice and Attorney General for Canada. In 1989, she became Chief of Staff to the Leader of the Government in the Senate and Minister of State for Federal-Provincial Relations, a position she held until her appointment as Secretary to the Governor General of Canada and Herald Chancellor of Canada in 1990.

Upon the completion of her term as Secretary to the Governor General in 2000, LaRocque was appointed Associate Deputy Minister at the Department of Canadian Heritage. She was promoted to the position of Deputy Minister at the Department in 2002, a position she held until her diplomatic appointment to the OECD in 2010.
