= Shuldham Redfern =

British colonial administrator

Sir Shuldham Redfern KCVO CMG
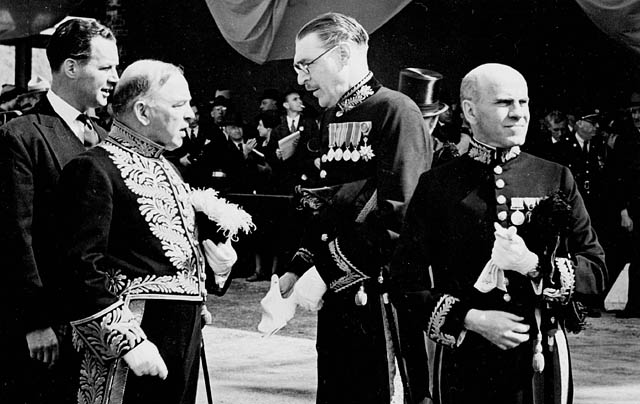
- Redfern, second right, in 1939.

Secretary to the Governor General of Canada
- In office 1935–1945
- Governors-General: The Lord Tweedsmuir; The Earl of Athlone
- Preceded by: Sir Alan Lascelles
- Succeeded by: Harry Letson

Personal details
- Born: 13 June 1895
- Died: 18 February 1985 (aged 89)
- Spouse: Ruth Marion Grimshaw (m. 1925; died 1972)
- Children: 1
- Education: Trinity College, Cambridge

Sir Arthur Shuldham Redfern, KCVO, CMG (13 June 1895 – 18 February 1985) was a British colonial administrator in the Sudan, and then Secretary to the Governor General of Canada from 1935 to 1945.

== Biography ==
The elder son of Dr J. J. Redfern, Shuldham Redfern was educated at Winchester College and Trinity College, Cambridge. During the First World War, he served in the Royal Flying Corps, then the Royal Air Force, reaching the rank of Major.

Joining the Sudan Political Service in 1920, Redfern successively served as Assistant District Commissioner in the Provinces of Khartoum, Darfur, and Blue Nile. He was Deputy Governor of Blue Nile Province from 1927, Assistant Civil Secretary (Personnel) in Khartoum from 1929, Commissioner, Port Sudan from 1932, and Governor of Kassala Province from 1934 to 1935.

In 1935, he was seconded to the Government of Canada and appointed Secretary to the Governor General of Canada, effective upon the assumption of office by Lord Tweedsmuir. He retired in 1945.

From 1947 to 1951 he served in the Commonwealth Division of the British Council. In retirement, he was Deputy Chairman of the Sudan Government British Pensioners Association from 1957 to 1977 and the first President of the English Chamber Orchestra and Music Society from 1982.

== Honours ==
Redfern was appointed an Officer of the Order of the Nile in 1925. He was knighted a Knight Commander of the Royal Victorian Order in 1939 and appointed Companion of the Order of St Michael and St George in 1945. He was also a Commander of the Order of Saint John.

== Family ==
Redfern married Ruth Marion Grimshaw in 1925; they had a son. Lady Redfern died in 1972.
