= Sheila-Marie Cook =

Canadian civil servant (1938–2020)

Sheila-Marie Suzanne Cook CVO (5 February 1938 - 10 December 2020) was a senior Canadian civil servant. She served as Secretary to the Governor General of Canada and Herald Chancellor of Canada from September 18, 2006 until January 31, 2011. In February 2007, she received her commission as Deputy of the Governor General of Canada. Originally from Granby, Quebec, she was a long-time resident of Calgary, Alberta.

In 2002, she was awarded a Queen Elizabeth II Golden Jubilee Medal, which recognized Canadians who have helped shape Canada. During the 2010 Royal Tour of Canada, Queen Elizabeth II presented Cook with the insignia of Commander of the Royal Victorian Order.

== Career ==
Cook received her undergraduate degree in History at Carleton University. Early in her career, she served as legislative assistant to the late Prime Minister Pierre Trudeau. Then-Mayor Ralph Klein appointed her as the City of Calgary's Chief of Protocol for the 1988 Winter Olympics.

Cook had extensive experience working in the federal public service and in para-public organizations, most specifically in strategic planning and management of Royal commissions, inquiries and public policy reviews. From 1994 - 1995, she served as Executive Director of the public inquiry into the Fraser River Salmon Crisis, and of the Minister's Monitoring Committee on Change in the Department of National Defense and Canadian Forces. She has been the director of Administration and Finance for the Royal Commission on Economic Union and Development Prospects for Canada; the Royal Commission on Electoral Reform and Party Financing; the National Transportation Act Review Commission; the Commission of Inquiry into Certain Events at the Prison for Women in Kingston, and the Citizens' Forum on Canada's Future. She was the senior advisor to the Royal Commission on Aboriginal Peoples; the Public Review Panel on Tanker Safety and Marine Spills Capability; the Commission to Review Allowances of Members of Parliament; the Pacific Fisheries Resource Conservation Council, and the Asia Pacific Economic Cooperation (APEC) Business Advisory Council. Cook was also the executive director and commission secretary for the commissions of Inquiry into the Investigation of the Bombing of Air India and the Sponsorship Program.

== Coat of Arms ==
Cook was granted arms by the Canadian Heraldic Authority on November 15, 2007.

Coat of arms of Sheila-Marie Cook

Crest
An elm tree Purpure leaved Or
Escutcheon
Or two square flaunches Purpure
Supporters
Two dragonflies Purpure winged and embellished Or
Motto
SERVIR ET CÉLÉBRER SON PAYS
