= Esmond Unwin Butler =

Canadian diplomat

Esmond Unwin Butler, OC, CVO (July 13, 1922 – December 18, 1989) was a Canadian diplomat. He was Ambassador Extraordinary and Plenipotentiary to Morocco. Previously, from 1959 to 1985, he was Secretary to the Governor General of Canada.

Born in Wawanesa, Manitoba, he was made an Officer of the Order of Canada in recognition for being "one of the key developers of the Canadian Honours System" in 1986.

Diplomatic posts
Preceded by Léopold Henri Amyot	Ambassador Extraordinary and Plenipotentiary to Morocco; 1985-	Succeeded by Wilfrid-Guy Licari
