= Herald Chancellor of Canada =

Herald Chancellor of the Canadian Heraldic Authority

Herald Chancellor
- Chancelier d'armes
- The coat of arms and batons of office of the Herald Chancellor of Canada
- Incumbent; Ken MacKillop since November 27, 2023
- Canadian Heraldic Authority
- Reports to: Governor General of Canada
- Seat: Rideau Hall, Ottawa
- Appointer: Governor General of Canada
- Term length: At the Governor General's pleasure
- Constituting instrument: Royal Letters Patent, 1988
- Formation: 1988
- First holder: Léopold Henri Amyot
- Deputy: Deputy Herald Chancellor
- Website: Official website

The Herald Chancellor (French: Chancelier d'armes) is an officer at the Canadian Heraldic Authority. The office is always filled by the Secretary to the Governor General. The Herald Chancellor is responsible for the administration of the entire vice-regal office. In some ways, the position is analogous to the Earl Marshal in England, as it is the Herald Chancellor who issues the warrants permitting the Chief Herald of Canada to make grants of arms. The Herald Chancellor also signs each completed grant document, along with the Chief Herald.

The position of Deputy Herald Chancellor (French: Vice-chancelier d'armes) is held by the Deputy Secretary to the Governor General, who is also the head of the Chancellery of Honours, responsible for the administration of the Canadian honours system. When the Herald Chancellor is unavailable, the Deputy Herald Chancellor will issue the proper warrants for the Chief Herald to grant arms.

== Coat of arms ==
Arms of a former Deputy Herald Chancellor, Emmanuelle Sajous

The Herald Chancellor has arms of office. The red shield features a gold maple tree with its roots visible. The maple tree represents the predominant species on the grounds of Rideau Hall, where the Canadian Heraldic Authority (CHA) is headquartered. The batons of office are red and gold, and they are decorated with shields of the arms of the CHA. The arms are impaled with the personal arms of the Herald Chancellor.

The Deputy Herald Chancellor uses similar arms: these are red with a white tree and an added white bordure. These are, likewise, impaled with the personal arms of the officeholder.

== Herald Chancellors ==
- 1988–1990: Léopold Henri Amyot, CVO, FRHSC(hon)
- 1990–2000: Judith A. LaRocque, CVO
- 2000–2006: Barbara Uteck, CVO
- 2006–2011: Sheila-Marie Cook, CVO
- 2011–2018: Stephen Wallace, CVO
- 2018–2021: Assunta Di Lorenzo
- 2021–2023: Ian McCowan
- 2023–present: Ken MacKillop

== Deputy Herald Chancellors ==
Coat of Arms and batons of office of the Deputy Herald Chancellor

- 1988–1992: LGen François Richard, CMM
- 1993–2004: LGen James C. Gervais, CMM
- 2005–2018: Emmanuelle Sajous,
- 2018–present: BGen Marc Thériault

== See also ==
- Chief Herald of Canada
