= Doyle Money Shaw =

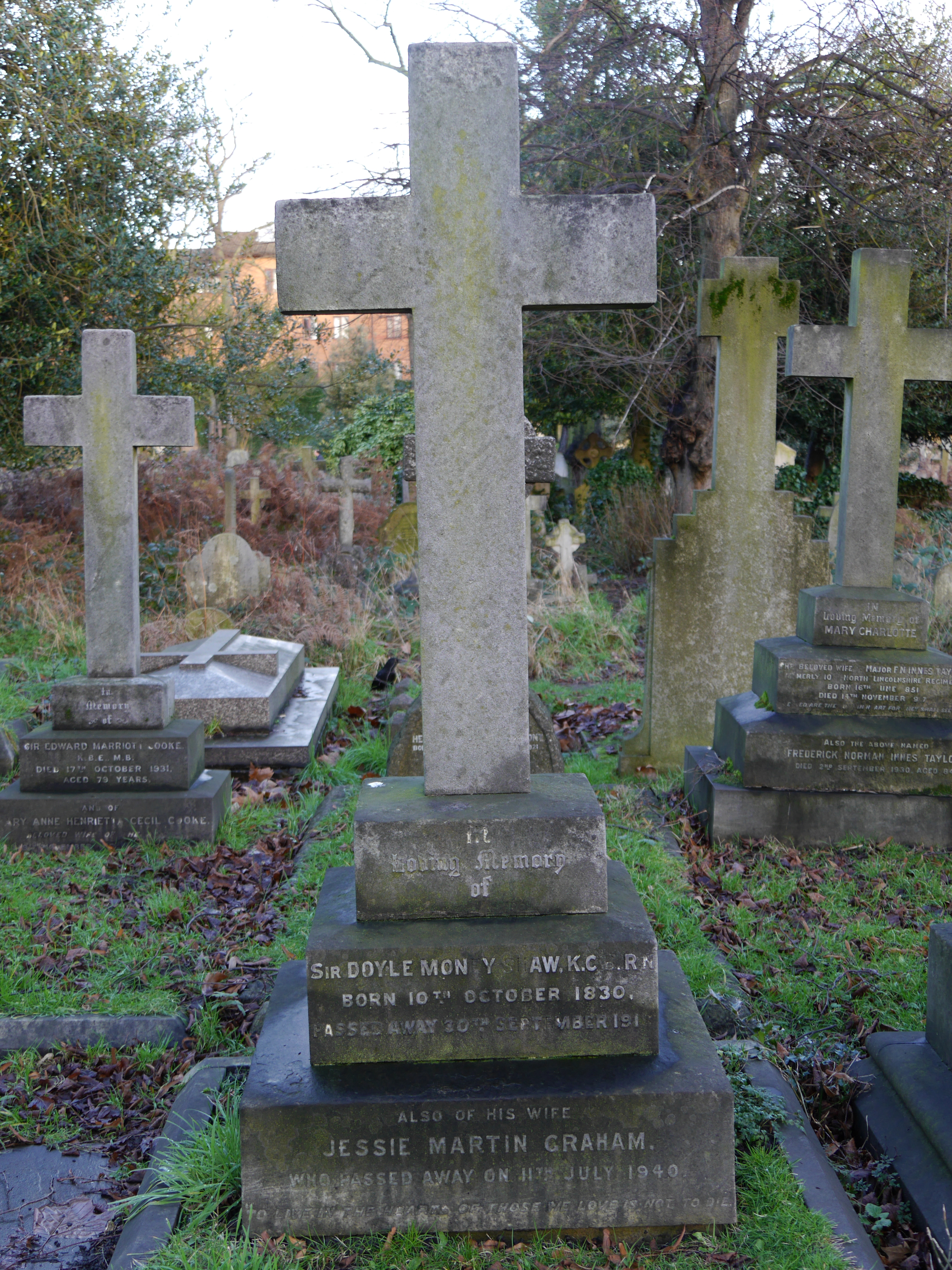
Funerary monument, Brompton Cemetery, London

Inspector-General of Hospitals and Fleets Sir Doyle Money Shaw KCB (10 October 1830 – 30 September 1918) was a Scottish physician and Royal Navy officer.

== Early life ==
Shaw was born in Bombay, British India, the fifth son of Christina and David Shaw HEICS, a surgeon. He was educated at Edinburgh Academy and the University of Edinburgh.

== Career ==
Shaw joined the Navy as an assistant surgeon in 1854, rising to Inspector-General of Hospitals and Fleets on 7 May 1888. He retired in 1892.

During the Crimean war he served aboard H.M.S.Spiteful at the capture of Sebastapol He then served with the marines in China from 1857 to 1861 he was present at the capture of Canton. In 1868 Shaw was senior medical officer aboard H.M.S. Octavia during the Abyssinian campaign. In 1882 during the Egyptian war Doyle Shaw served aboard H.M.S. Alexandra during the bombardment of Alexandria. Shaw became Deputy Inspector General at Plymouth Hospital 1884–1886. He also served as Deputy Inspector General 1886–1888. Doyle Shaw was also Deputy Inspector General at Hasler from 1888 to 1892. He retired in 1892.

He was made a Knight Commander of the Order of the Bath (KCB) in the 1911 Coronation Honours.

== Burial ==
Shaw is buried on the east side of the main entrance path of Brompton Cemetery.
