= Adolphus Liddell =

British civil servant and barrister (1818–1885)

The Honourable Sir Adolphus Liddell KCB QC
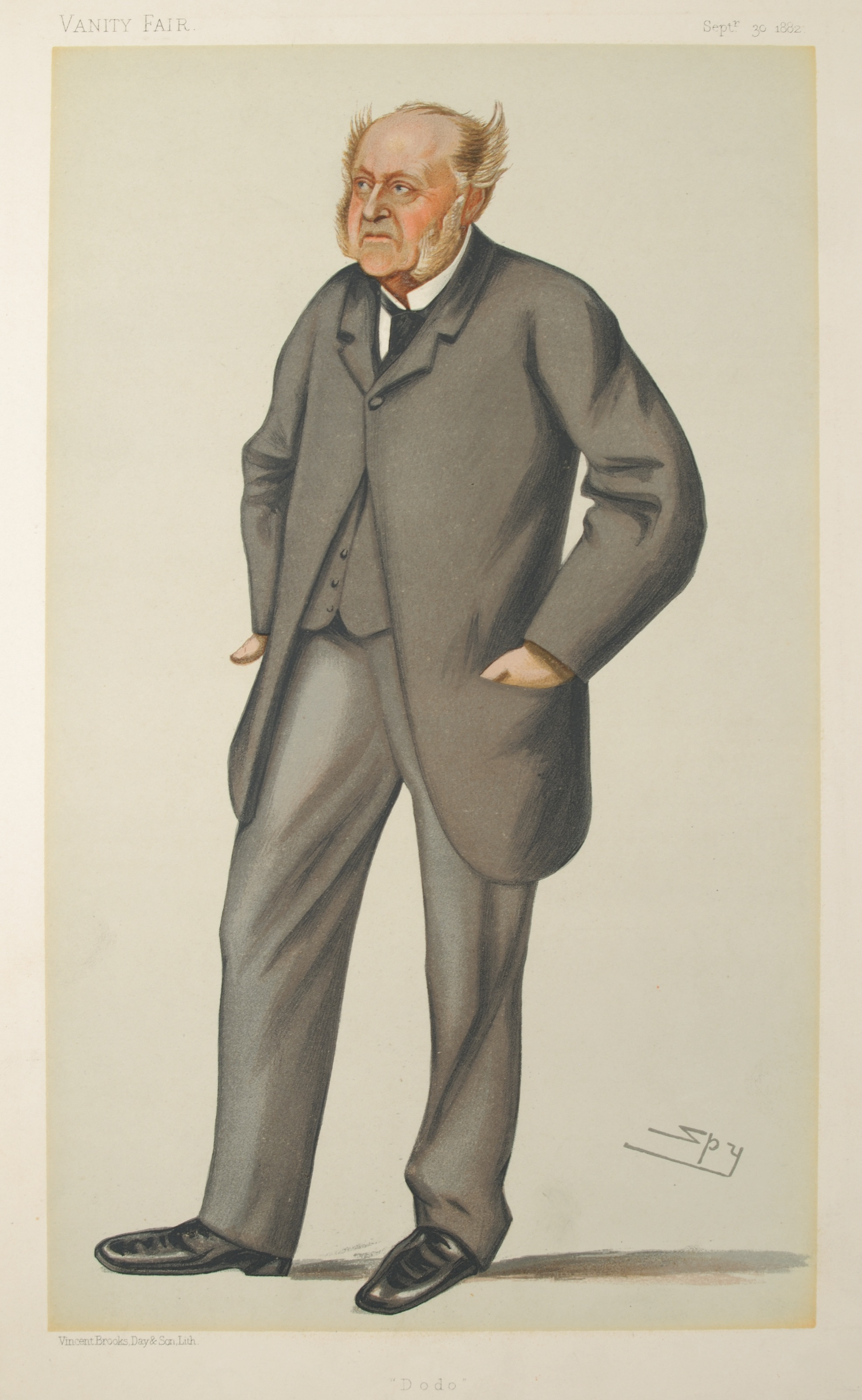
- Born: 15 January 1818
- Died: 27 June 1885 (aged 67)
- Education: Eton College
- Alma mater: Christ Church, Oxford; All Souls College, Oxford
- Occupations: Civil servant; barrister
- Father: Thomas Liddell, 1st Baron Ravensworth
- Relatives: Sir Alan Lascelles (grandson)

The Honourable Sir Adolphus Frederick Octavius Liddell KCB, QC (15 January 1818 – 27 June 1885) was a British civil servant who was Permanent Under-Secretary of State at the Home Office from 1867 until his death in 1885. The son of Thomas Liddell, 1st Baron Ravensworth, Liddell was educated at Eton College and Christ Church, Oxford, where he took third-class honours in Literae humaniores in 1838, before being elected a fellow of All Souls College, Oxford. He was called to the bar by the Inner Temple in 1844, took silk in 1861, and was created a KCB in 1880.

He was the father of the society figure and lawyer Adolphus George Charles Liddell and the maternal grandfather of Sir Alan Lascelles.

He was buried in Sheen Cemetery.
