= Herbert Ellison Rhodes James =

British Army medical officer and administrator

Lieutenant Colonel Herbert Ellison Rhodes James C.B, CMG, OBE, F.R.C.S (20 October 1857 – 9 August 1939) was a British Army medical officer and administrator known for his humanitarian efforts and organizational reforms in military medicine.

== Early life and education ==
James was born at Goodnestone, Kent, the second son of Reverend Herbert James, Rector of Livermere, and Mary Emily James (née Horton), daughter of Admiral Joshua Sydney Horton. His elder brother, Sydney James, served as headmaster of Malvern College and Archdeacon of Dudley, while his younger brother, Montague Rhodes James as a medieval scholar.

Educated at Aldeburgh School and Charing Cross Hospital, James joined the Army Medical School at Netley in 1882, receiving his commission on 4 February of that year.

== Military career ==
James's early postings included Aldershot and Cyprus (1883–1888). From 1892 to 1897, he served in China, where he was appointed to the permanent sanitary committee for British troops. During an 1894 bubonic plague outbreak in Hong Kong, his efforts earned commendation from the colonial government. He later accompanied Chinese forces during the First Sino-Japanese War (1894–1895), authoring reports on medical organization that influenced War Office policy. The Chinese government awarded him the Order of the Double Dragon for his service to the wounded.

After returning to Britain, James held roles as secretary to the Principal Medical Officer (Home District) and senior instructor at the Royal Army Medical Corps depot in Aldershot. During the Second Boer War, he served as commandant of the RAMC depot. Post-war, he contributed to reforms as secretary of a commission investigating medical shortcomings in South Africa, working alongside figures such as Secretary of State for War St John Broderick and Director-General Alfred Keogh.

James played a pivotal role in relocating the Army Medical School from Netley to London's Millbank site, establishing a modernized medical centre. He became its first commandant and director of studies, overseeing the hospital and school until his retirement in 1908. Post-retirement, he advised the War Office on training for medical units of the Officers' Training Corps.

During World War I, James returned to active service, commanding No. 11 General Hospital in Egypt (1915) and later supervising medical operations in Salonika (1916–1918). His service earned him the C.B, CMG and OBE, as well as mentions in dispatches. After the war, he resumed training duties at the War Office before retiring permanently. He was a lifelong friend of Sir Edward Ward, Permanent Under-Secretary of State for War, who supported his initiatives.

== Personal life ==
A man of diverse interests, James collected Chinese art, enjoyed fishing, carpentry, and shooting, and was known as a skilled storyteller. He never married and died in Gilston, Salisbury, Southern Rhodesia on 9 August 1939.
