= Herbert Creedy =

British civil servant (1878–1973)

Portrait by Walter Stoneman, 1918

Sir Herbert James Creedy, GCB, KCVO (3 May 1878 – 3 April 1973) was a British civil servant who spent his career at the War Office, where he served as Permanent Under-Secretary of State for War from 1924 to 1939.

== Biography ==
He received classical education at St. John's College, Oxford but after a brief period of work as a scholar there moved on to the War Office as a clerk in 1901 (he continued classical studies as a hobby later in life) and rose within ranks to become private secretary to the secretary of state in 1913. Creedy was Secretary of the War Office from 1920 to 1924 and Permanent Under-Secretary of State for War from 1924 to 1939. His uninterrupted service at one department was longer than Sir Maurice Hankey's.

After his retirement Creedy was the governor of Wellington College and the commissioner of the Royal Hospital, Chelsea. He disliked the RAF strategic bombing practices and argued against the creation of the Ministry of Defence.
