= Eric Miéville =

British civil servant (1896–1971)

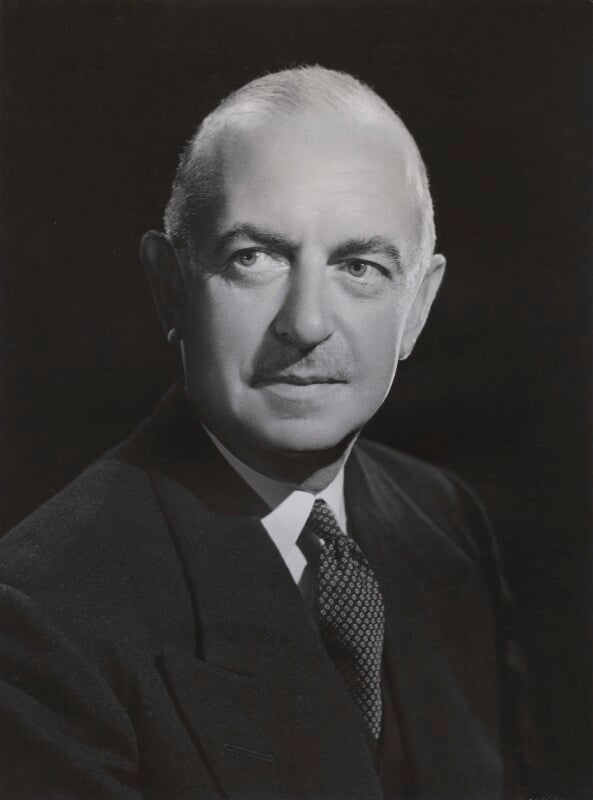
Miéville in 1948

Sir Eric Charles Miéville GCIE KCVO CSI CMG (31 January 1896 – 16 September 1971) was a senior British civil servant who served as Assistant Private Secretary to George VI from 1937 to 1945, and who also served as Private Secretary to several Governors-General of India and Canada.

== Early life and family ==
Eric Charles Miéville was born in Acton, London, England, the youngest son of Charles Ernest Miéville (1858–1940), a stockbroker and estate agent, and Alice Huleat Garcia Bampfield (1864–1934). The Miéville family is Swiss in origin, descending from Yverdon-les-Bains. His uncle was the author Sir Walter Miéville. He was educated at St Paul's School. In the First World War, he served with the Queen's Own Royal West Kent Regiment, rising to the rank of Second Lieutenant, but was honourably discharged with a Silver War Badge.

== Career ==
=== China ===
Miéville joined the Far Eastern Consular Service in 1919 as a student interpreter of Chinese. From 1920 to 1927, he served as a private secretary and local vice-consul to successive British Ministers in Peking.

=== Canada and India ===
In 1927, Miéville was appointed secretary to the Governor General of Canada, Freeman Freeman-Thomas, 1st Marquess of Willingdon, in which capacity he served until the end of Lord Willingdon's tenure in 1931. Subsequently, he accompanied Freeman-Thomas to India upon his appointment as Governor-General of India and continued to serve as his secretary until the latter's retirement in 1936. From 1935 to 1936, he concurrently served as secretary on the Viceroy's Executive Council, and for his service was appointed Knight Commander of the Order of the Indian Empire.

=== Assistant Private Secretary to George VI ===
On 20 July 1936, Miéville was appointed Assistant Private Secretary to the Duke of York, succeeding Harold Campbell. Following the abdication of Edward VIII, he continued his service to the now-George VI until 1945. He resigned his position that year in favour of the private sector. He was elected to serve in various directorships, including as director of Westminster Bank.

=== Return to India ===
In the spring of 1947, Lord Mountbatten requested Miéville return to India along with General Ismay to assist him during the crucial period leading up to the independence of India. Miéville reportedly did not hesitate, and left England in April 1947 to serve as private secretary to Mountbatten, the last Viceroy of India, and as such played a minor role in the preparations of the partition of India in August. He was promoted to a Knight Grand Commander of the Order of the Indian Empire (GCIE) in 1947, becoming one of the final recipients of the order.

Miéville's knowledge of the world and his experience of affairs made him a valuable member of a board of directors and this was recognized in many quarters. His understanding of people and his cheerful and sympathetic personality enabled him to contribute much to the handling of staff matters. He was a man of many and lasting friendships, which included conspicuously those with the distinguished personalities whom he had served so well and always so devotedly.

— Obituary of Sir Eric Miéville, The Times, 17 September 1971

== Personal and later life ==
While posted in China, he married Dorothy Haslock on 7 March 1922.

Following his return from India in August 1947, Miéville rejoined the private sector. He was appointed director of numerous groups, including the Amalgamated Tin Mines of Nigeria in 1956 and the London Tin Corporation in 1957. In 1949, he was appointed to a Royal Commission on lotteries.

He died in Midhurst, aged 75.

== Honours ==
- Companion of the Order of St Michael and St George (CMG), 1930
- Companion of the Order of the Star of India (CSI), 1933
- Knight Commander of the Order of the Indian Empire (KCIE), 1936
- Knights Grand Commander of the Order of the Indian Empire (GCIE), 1948
- Knight Commander of the Royal Victorian Order (KCVO), 1943
