= Arthur French Sladen =

British-Canadian civil servant (1866–1944)

Arthur French Sladen, CMG, CVO (30 April 1866 – 6 March 1944) was a British-Canadian civil servant who served as secretary to five governors general of Canada, from 1899 until 1926.

Born in Woolwich, England, Sladen was a son of Lieutenant-Colonel Joseph Sladen of Ripple Court, Kent and the former Caroline Mary French, of Queenstown, Ireland. He was educated at Haileybury and the Royal Naval College. He joined the Royal Marine Artillery in 1884, and came to Canada in 1887 and farmed there and in the United States.

He joined the Governor General's office in 1891 as a clerk and was appointed private secretary to Lord Minto in 1899. He continued in office under Lord Grey, the Duke of Connaught, the Duke of Devonshire, and Lord Byng of Vimy. He was appointed CMG in 1911 and CVO in 1916.

He was allegedly dismissed by William Lyon Mackenzie King on account of his suspected Conservative sympathies. He died in Ottawa in 1944.
