= George Benjamin Hodson =

British Indian Army officer killed during the First World War's Gallipoli campaign

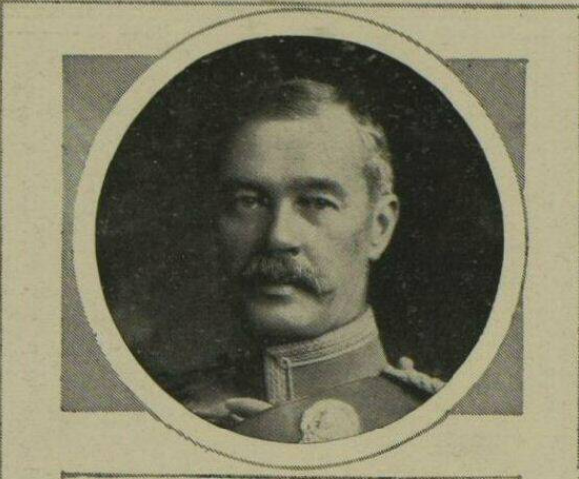

Brigadier General George Benjamin Hodson, CB, DSO (October 1863 – 25 January 1916) was a British Indian Army officer. He died of wounds sustained at Suvla during the Gallipoli campaign, while in command of the 33rd Indian Brigade.

He was commissioned as a subaltern, with the rank of lieutenant, into the South Staffordshire Regiment of the British Army in May 1882, after graduating from the Royal Military College, Sandhurst.

He was promoted to the temporary rank of brigadier general in October 1915.
