= List of officers of the Royal Victorian Order =

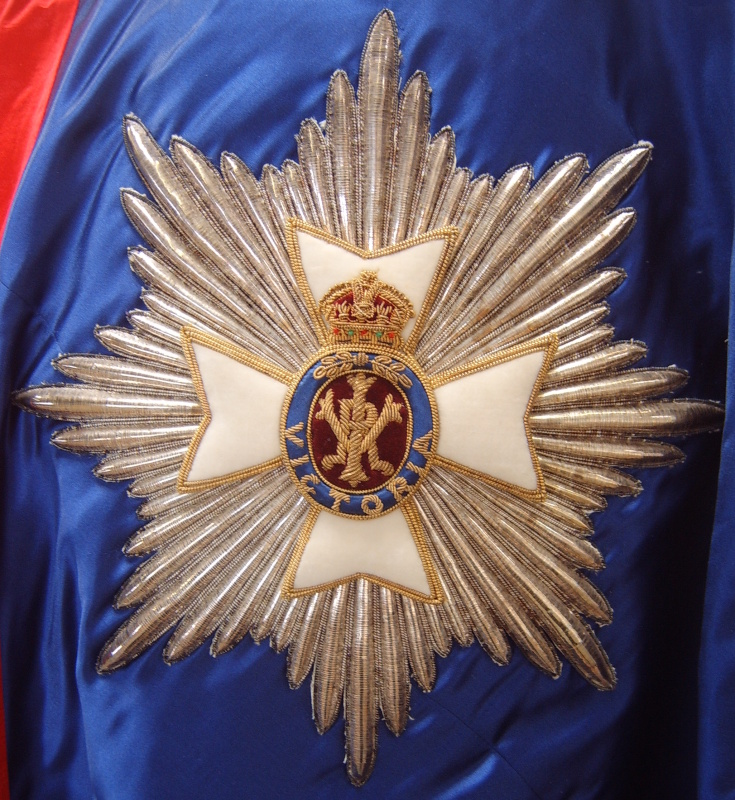
The star of a Knight or Dame Grand Cross of the Royal Victorian Order

The Royal Victorian Order is an order of knighthood awarded by the sovereign of the United Kingdom and several Commonwealth realms. It is granted personally by the monarch and recognises personal service to the monarchy, the Royal Household, royal family members, and the organisation of important royal events. The order was officially created and instituted on 23 April 1896 by letters patent under the Great Seal of the Realm by Queen Victoria. The order has had five grades since its institution, the two highest of which confer the status of knighthood on holders (apart from foreigners, who typically received honorary awards not entitling them to the style of a knight). Women were not admitted until Edward VIII altered the statutes of the order in 1936. The order has five statutory officers—Grand Master, Chancellor, Secretary, Registrar and Chaplain—as well as a non-statutory Honorary Genealogist.

The order has had a chancellor and a secretary since it was founded; the former office is held ex officio by the Lord Chamberlain of the Royal Household, while the office of secretary has been held ex officio by the Keeper of the Privy Purse (except for the years 1936 to 1943 when the King's Private Secretary was also the order's secretary). The order has had a registrar since 1916; the first appointee was the Secretary of the Private Secretary's Office, Sir Francis Morgan Bryant, while his two successors were Secretaries to the Privy Purse; since 1936, the Registrar has always been the Secretary of the Central Chancery of the Orders of Knighthood. On 1 February 1937, King George VI appointed his Queen, Elizabeth (later the Queen Mother) as the order's inaugural Grand Master; after her death in 2002, the office fell vacant until Elizabeth II appointed her daughter, Anne, Princess Royal, Grand Master. The Savoy Chapel was made the order's chapel in 1938 and its chaplain has also been ex officio the order's chaplain ever since. Since 1938, the order has also had an Honorary Genealogist, who has also been an Officer of Arms, although appointees are not technically officers of the order, there being no provision for it in the statutes.

== Grand Masters ==
Name	Dates	Ref.
Queen Elizabeth the Queen Mother, LG, LT, CI, GCVO, GBE, GCStJ, RRC, ONZ, CC, CD	1937–2002	
The Princess Anne, Princess Royal, KG, KT, GCVO, GCStJ, ADC(P), QSO, CMM, CD, GCL	2007–present	

== Chancellors ==
Name	Dates	Ref.
The 1st Earl of Lathom, GCB, PC	1896–1898	
The 7th Earl of Hopetoun, KT, GCVO, GCMG, PC (Later Marquess of Linlithgow)	1898–1900	
The 5th Earl of Clarendon, GCB, GCVO, PC, DL	1900–1905	
Colonel The 6th Earl Spencer, KG, GCVO, VD, PC	1905–1912	
The 1st Viscount Sandhurst, GCB, GCSI, GCIE, GCVO, PC	1912–1921	
Brigadier General The 8th Duke of Atholl, KT, GCVO, CB, DSO, PC, ADC	1921–1922	
The 2nd Earl of Cromer, GCB, GCIE, GCVO, PC, ADC	1922–1938	
The 6th Earl of Clarendon, KG, GCMG, GCVO, PC, DL	1938–1952	
Major General The 11th Earl of Scarbrough, KG, GCSI, GCIE, GCVO, TD, PC, DL	1952–1963	
The 1st Lord Cobbold, KG, GCVO, PC, DL	1963–1971	
The Lord Maclean, KT, GCVO, KBE, PC	1971–1984	
Captain The 13th Earl of Airlie, KT, GCVO, PC, JP	1984–1997	
The 7th Lord Camoys, GCVO, PC, DL	1998–2000	
The Lord Luce, KG, GCVO, PC, DL	2000–2006	
The 3rd Earl Peel, GCVO, PC, DL	2006–2021	
The Lord Parker of Minsmere, GCVO, KCB, PC	2021–2024	
The Lord Benyon, GCVO, PC	2024–present	

== Secretaries ==
Name	Dates	Ref.
Lieutenant Colonel Sir Fleetwood Edwards, GCVO, KCB, ISO	1896–1901	
General Sir Dighton Probyn, VC, GCB, GCSI, GCVO, ISO, PC	1901–1910	
Lieutenant Colonel Sir William Carington, GCVO, KCB, PC, JP	1910–1914	
Lieutenant Colonel Sir Frederick Ponsonby, GCB, GCVO, PC (later The Lord Sysonby)	1914–1935	
Colonel The 1st Lord Wigram, GCB, GCVO, CSI, PC	1935–1936	
Major Sir Alexander Hardinge, GCB, GCVO, MC, PC (later The 2nd Lord Hardinge of Penshurst)	1936–1943	
Sir Ulick Alexander, GCB, GCVO, CMG, OBE	1943–1952	
Brigadier The 2nd Lord Tyron, GCVO, KCB, DSO, DL	1952–1971	
Major Sir Rennie Maudslay, GCVO, KCB, MBE	1971–1987	
Sir Peter Miles, KCVO	1981–1987	
Major Sir Shane Blewitt, GCVO	1988–1996	
Sir Michael Peat, GCVO	1996–2002	
Sir Philip Alan Reid, GCVO	2002–2017	
Sir Michael Stevens, KCVO	2017–2025	
James Chalmers	2025–present	

== Registrars ==
Name	Dates	Ref.
Sir Francis Morgan Bryant, CB, CVO, CBE, ISO	1916–1931	
Rear Admiral Philip John Hawkins Lander Row, CB, CVO	1931–1932	
Commander Dudley Colles, KCB, KCVO, OBE	1932–1936	
Major Sir Henry Hudson Fraser Stockley, KCVO, OBE	1936–1946	
Brigadier Sir Ivan de la Bere, KCVO, CB, CBE	1946–1960	
Major General Sir Cyril Harry Colquhoun, KCVO, CB, OBE	1960–1968	
Major General Sir Peter Bernard Gillett, KCVO, CB, CBE	1968–1979	
Major General Sir Desmond Hind Garrett Rice, KCVO, CBE	1980–1991	
Lieutenant Colonel Walter Ross, GCVO, OBE, GCStJ, DL	1989–1991	
Lieutenant Colonel Anthony Charles McClure Mather, CBE	1991–1999	
Lieutenant Colonel Robert Guy Cartwright	1999–2005	
Lieutenant Colonel Sir Alexander Fergus Matheson, Bt.	2005–2014	
Lieutenant Colonel James Vernon	2014–2019	
Lieutenant Colonel Stephen Segrave	2019–present	

== Chaplains ==
Name	Dates	Ref.
The Rev. Cyril Leonard Cresswell, KCVO	1938–1961	
The Rev. Roger Lewis Roberts, CVO	1961–1973	
The Rev. Cecil Edwin Young	1973–1983	
The Rev. John Herbert Williams, LVO	1983–1989	
The Rev. John Phillips Robson, LVO	1989–2002	
The Rev. Prebendary William Sievwright Scott, CVO	2002–2007	
The Rev. Prof. Peter John Galloway, LVO, OBE, KStJ, JP, FSA	2008–2019	
The Rev. Thomas Woodhouse	2019–present	

== Honorary Genealogists ==
Name	Dates	Ref.
Captain Alfred Butler, MVO, MC	1938–1946	
Squadron Leader Sir George Bellew, KCB, KCVO, KStJ	1946–1960	
Major The 17th Lord Sinclair, LVO, DL	1960–1968	
Sir Walter Verco, KCVO	1968–1987	
Hubert Chesshyre, FSA, FHS (formerly CVO)	1987–2010	
Sir David White, KCVO, OStJ	2010–present	
