= Kanga =

Kanga may refer to:

- Kanga people, an ethnic minority in Sudan
  - Kanga language, the language spoken by the Kanga people
- Kanga (garment), a sheet of fabric worn by women in East Africa
- Kanga (comics), a fictional species of kangaroos in DC Comics
- "Kanga" (song), a 2018 song by 6ix9ine from the album Dummy Boy
- Kanga (Winnie-the-Pooh), a character in the children's book Winnie the Pooh
- Kanga Cricket League, Indian cricket league named after Hormasji Kanga
- Kanga Loaders, an Australian brand of compact utility loaders
- Kanga, Tanzania, a ward of Chunya District
- Kanga, nickname of Dale Tryon, Baroness Tryon (1948–1997), and the name of her clothing line
- KANGA, the callsign for V Australia Airlines

== People with the surname or nickname ==
- Guélor Kanga, Gabonese footballer
- Hormasji Kanga (1880–1945), Indian cricketer
- Wilfried Kanga, French footballer
- John Kennedy Sr. or "Kanga" (1928–2020), Australian rules footballer
- Dale Tryon, Baroness Tryon or "Kanga" (1948–1997), British businesswoman

== See also ==
- Canga (disambiguation)
- Kenga (disambiguation)
- Kangaroo, the Australian animal and icon
- KangaROOS, an American brand of sneaker
- Kangas (surname)
- Kangavar, a city in Kermanshah Province, Iran
- Kangha, a small wooden comb that is supposed to be kept with the hair at all times
