= 5th Regiment of Horse =

5th Regiment of Horse or 5th Horse may refer to:

- Princess Anne of Denmark's Regiment of Horse, ranked as 5th Horse from 1685 to 1690
- 4th Royal Irish Dragoon Guards, ranked as 5th Horse from 1690 to 1746
- 5th Horse, cavalry regiment of the Pakistan Army
