= Baron Tryon =

Barony in the Peerage of the United Kingdom

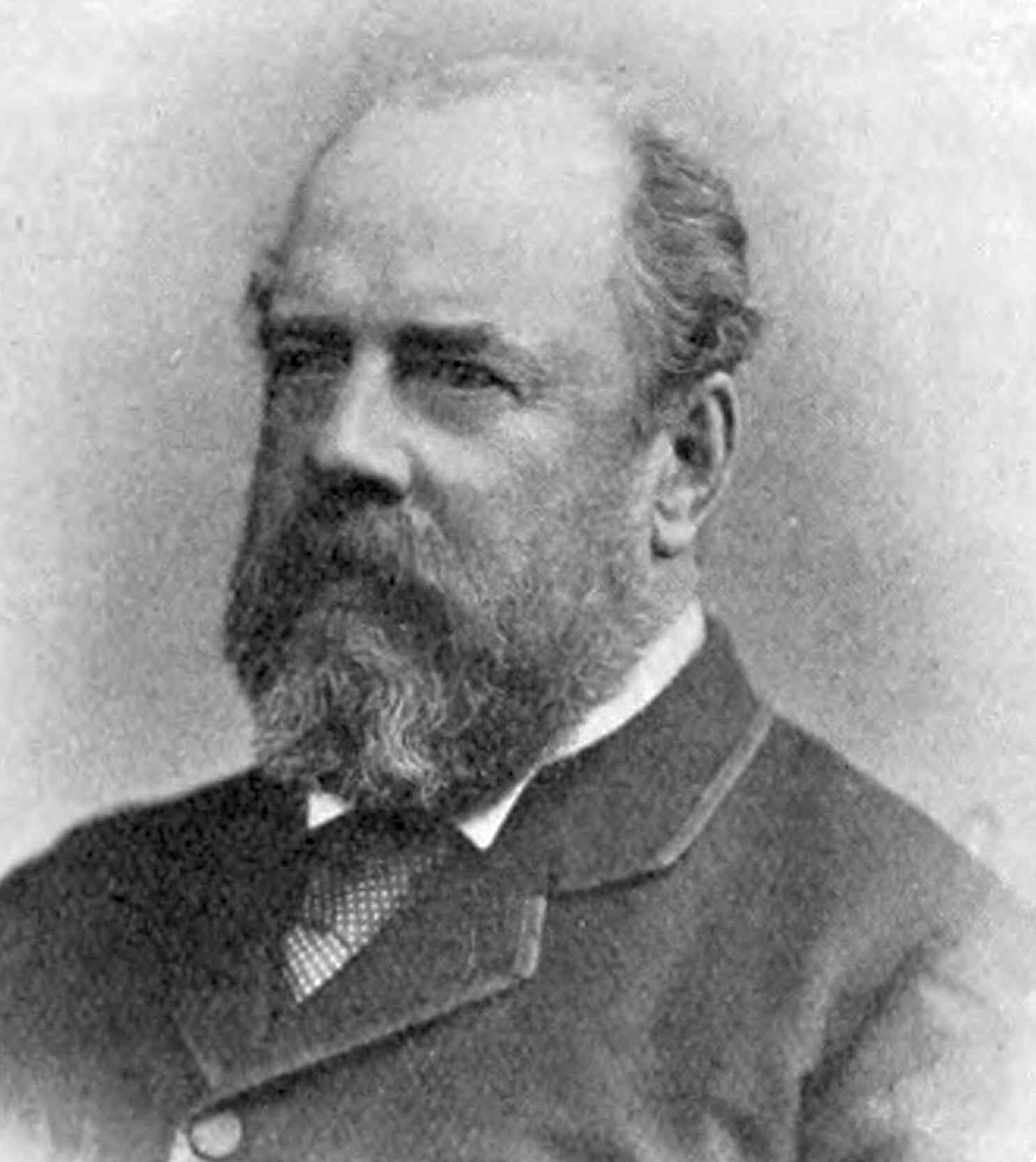
Vice-Admiral Sir George Tryon, ancestor of the Barons Tryon

Baron Tryon, of Durnford in the County of Wiltshire, is a title in the Peerage of the United Kingdom. It was created in 1940 for the Conservative politician George Tryon. He was the son of the naval commander Vice-Admiral Sir George Tryon. As of 2018 the title is held by the first Baron's great-grandson, the fourth Baron, who succeeded his father in 2018.

The family seat is The Manor House, near Great Durnford, Wiltshire.

== Barons Tryon (1940) ==
- George Clement Tryon, 1st Baron Tryon (1871–1940)
- Charles George Vivian Tryon, 2nd Baron Tryon (1906–1976)
- Anthony George Merrik Tryon, 3rd Baron Tryon (1940–2018)
- Charles George Barrington Tryon, 4th Baron Tryon (b. 1976)

The heir apparent is the present holder's son, the Hon. Guy Aylmer George Tryon (b. 2015)

== Arms ==
Coat of arms of Baron Tryon
Crest Issuant from a coronet composed of four roses set upon a rim Or a bear's head Sable charged with seven stars in the form of the Constellation Ursa Major Gold Escutcheon Azure a fess embattled between in chief three estoiles and in base a portcullis chained Or. Supporters Dexter an army pensioner in hospital uniform sinister a postman holding with the exterior hand a letter sack over his shoulder Proper. Motto Do Right And Fear Not
