= Cangas =

Cangas may refer to:

== Places ==
- Cangas, Pontevedra, a town and municipality in Galicia, Spain
- Cangas de Onís, a municipality in Asturias, Spain
- Cangas del Narcea, a municipality in Asturias, Spain
  - Cangas del Narcea (parish), capital of the municipality

== Other uses ==
- Cangas (Vino de la Tierra), a Spanish appellation for Vino de Calidad wines from Asturias
- Canga's bead symptom, the irregular appearance of uterus and nodular structures in tuba uterina observed in patients with genital tuberculosis
- CB Cangas, a handball club based in Cangas, Pontevedra
- Johan de Cangas (fl. 13th century), Spanish troubadour

== See also ==
- Canga (disambiguation)
