= Anthony Tryon, 3rd Baron Tryon =

British peer (1940–2018)

The Right Honourable The Lord Tryon OBE DL
- Born: Anthony George Merrik Tryon; 26 May 1940
- Died: 22 December 2018 (aged 78); Great Durnford, Wiltshire, England
- Burial place: St Andrew's Church, Great Durnford
- Education: Eton College
- Spouse: Dale Harper (m. 1973; div. 1997)
- Children: 4; including Zoë Tryon
- Parents: Charles Tryon, 2nd Baron Tryon (father); Etheldreda Burrell (mother)

Anthony George Merrik Tryon, 3rd Baron Tryon (26 May 1940 – 22 December 2018) was a British peer, businessman, and courtier who was a close confidant of Charles, Prince of Wales (later Charles III).

== Early life ==
Anthony George Merrik Tryon was born on 26 May 1940 to the Hon. Charles George Vivian Tryon and his wife, Etheldreda Josephine Burrell (1909–2002), daughter of Sir Merrik Burrell, 7th Baronet. One month before his birth, his paternal grandfather, George Tryon, 1st Baron Tryon, had been created Baron Tryon. He died in November 1940, and the title passed to Tryon's father.

Tryon was educated at Eton College. At the coronation of Elizabeth II in June 1953, he served as page to his father, who was Keeper of the Privy Purse. He later served as a page of honour to the Queen, carrying her train at ceremonial occasions including the State Opening of Parliament and Garter Day.

== Career ==
After leaving Eton, Tryon moved to Australia, where he worked as a jackaroo for 18 months. On his return to the United Kingdom, he joined Lazard. In 1969, he was appointed to the board of James Purdey & Sons. He eventually became a director of Lazard in 1976. That same year, he succeeded to the Tryon barony on the death of his father. As a hereditary peer, he sat in the House of Lords as a Crossbench peer. He was introduced on 2 February 1977 and lost his seat following the passage of the House of Lords Act 1999 in November 1999.

In 1972, Tryon was made a captain in the recently established Wessex Yeomanry. He was appointed a deputy lieutenant of Wiltshire in 1992. He was made an Officer of the Order of the British Empire (OBE) in the 2001 Birthday Honours for his work with the Salisbury Cathedral Spire Trust.

== Personal life ==
Tryon married Australian socialite Dale Harper on 13 April 1973 at the Chapel Royal, St James's Palace, in a ceremony attended by Princess Margaret and Prince Michael of Kent. They had four children:

- The Honourable Zoë Elizabeth Tryon (born 1 May 1974)
- Charles George Barrington Tryon (born 15 May 1976); a godson of Charles III, succeeded his father as 4th Baron Tryon in 2018
- The Honourable Edward Henry Tryon (born 18 December 1979)
- The Honourable Victoria Clementine Tryon (born 18 December 1979)

Tryon and his wife were among the closest friends of Charles, Prince of Wales. A regular guest at the Prince's residences, Tryon belonged to his inner social circle, while Lady Tryon was one of the Prince's closest confidantes during the 1970s and 1980s. Their friendship with the Prince endured for decades, and the couple frequently accompanied him on social engagements and private holidays.

In June 1997, Tryon informed his wife that he wished to end their marriage. Shortly afterwards, she was detained under the Mental Health Act 1983, and the couple's decree nisi was announced on 1 September 1997. Dale, Lady Tryon, died from septicaemia on 15 November 1997, aged 49. He never remarried.

Tryon died at his home in Great Durnford on 22 December 2018, aged 78. He was buried in the churchyard of St Andrew's Church, Great Durnford. He was succeeded in the barony by his eldest son, Charles.

Peerage of the United Kingdom
Preceded by Charles Tryon	Baron Tryon; 1976–2018	Succeeded by Charles Tryon
