= Canga =

Canga may refer to:

- Canga's bead symptom, the irregular appearance of uterus and nodular structures in tuba uterina observed in patients with genital tuberculosis
- Cap. FAP Pedro Canga Rodríguez Airport (IATA: TBP, ICAO: SPME), airport serving Tumbes, Peru
- Pseudopaludicola canga, species of frog in the family Leptodactylidae
- Canga (harvestman), a genus in family Neogoveidae

== People with the surname ==
- José Canga-Argüelles (1770–1843), Spanish statesman
- María Cangá (born 1962), female judoka from Ecuador

== See also ==
- Cangas (disambiguation)
- Kanga (disambiguation)
