= Digga Machinery Attachments =

Australian brand of construction machinery attachments

- Type: Private
- Industry: Construction Machinery Attachments
- Founded: Tingalpa, Queensland, Australia (1981)
- Founder: Stewart Wright
- Headquarters: Yatala, Queensland, Australia
- Products: Trenchers, Augers, Auger Drives, Anchor Drives, 3 Point Linkage Augers
- Website: www.digga.com

Digga is an Australian brand of machinery attachments to suit heavy construction equipment, including excavators, skid steer loaders, telehandlers, truck cranes, tractors and mini loaders. The company's head office is based in Yatala, Queensland with two other facilities across Australia (Victoria and New South Wales) and a network of dealers across the country.

Digga also has company-owned facilities in England and in Iowa, USA. The UK facility is central to the European market while the Iowa facility looks after the North American customers and dealers. Digga attachments are also sold in over 60 countries around the globe through a network of over 450 dealers.

Digga was founded in Brisbane, Australia in 1981 as a supplier of earthmoving wearparts to local machinery operators. After a need for repairs and the supply of drilling augers arose, a small factory in Tingalpa, Brisbane was established. This led to requests for more attachments, and Digga soon became an advanced manufacturer. It then acquired Kanga Loaders, which it amalgamated with Digga's service divisions to form MASR.

As of present, Digga Machinery Attachments manufactures over 70 different attachments in addition to the earthmoving wearparts the company originally began with.

== History ==
=== The 1980s ===
Established in 1981 by Stewart Wright, as a supplier of earth moving wear parts to local operators, Digga was originally a one-man operation using a telephone box at an Eight Mile Plains Caravan Park to take phone orders and call customers. A need for repairs and supply of Drilling Augers arose and a small factory in Tingalpa was established in 1982 the beginning of Digga Manufacturing.

=== The 1990s ===
Digga introduced robotic welding and computerised machining in 1989 before advanced steel cutting was achieved a few years later. 1997 saw Digga exporting to Europe and New Zealand growing into exporting to US in 1999.

=== The 2000s ===
In 2000 Digga established a dedicated research and development department headed up by Stewart Wright, the founder of Digga. This department was responsible for designing the Swing Control System a new safety device in 2002, leading to several design awards. In 2004 a new era was started with the appointment of Suzie Wright as CEO. As the company continued to grow the overseas branch in Hungerford (Berkshire, UK) became company owned and in 2005 Digga moved into a new head office and manufacturing plant. The 8000sqm facility is situated in Yatala, Queensland was filled with machines and workers. Mid 2007 saw the facility grow further with a 4500spm extension added with new material handling machines required.

A major announcement in 2009 was the acquisition of Kanga Loaders which was followed later that year by the launch of Machinery Attachment Service and Repairs or MASR. In 2010 Digga purchased Universal Augers to expand into the specialist drilling market with rock augers, core barrels, clean-out buckets and custom drilling solutions.

=== The 2010s ===
In 2013 Digga constructed a dedicated facility in Dyersville, Iowa after growing demand for its products in North America. The US operation concentrates on distributing the company's flagship products including Auger Drives, Anchor Drives, Augers, Sweeper Brooms, Pallet Forks, Soil Conditioners and stick Rakes. In 2016, an electrical spark in the main manufacturing facility in Brisbane Australia caused a fire to break out and destroy the entire factory and head office in Australia. After only 4 days of lost work Project Phoenix was created and the team were up and running in temporary facilities and offices. 18 months later Digga moved back into their new 12,000sqm facility. In 2018, Digga lost their CEO, Suzie Wright, to Ovarian Cancer. Alan Wade took over as CEO shortly after.

=== The 2020s ===
In 2020, Digga's research and development team released the HALO Auger Alignment System. The HALO Auger Alignment system uses a set of red and green lights to guide the machine operator back to drilling plumb holes. Digga sees HALO as the future of drilling. 2021 brought the release of the Digga HALO Auger Alignment System to all sizes as well as a limited release of retrofit kits. The system was also released to the European market, to even more success. Digga has plans to release the system into the US market in 2022.
