= Kenga =

Kenga may refer to:

- David Kenga (born 1982), Kenyan soccer player who plays for Indiana Invaders in the USL Premier Development League
- Tongla Kenga, town in Mongar District in southeastern-central Bhutan
- Kenga language, spoken in Chad
- Kenga Khachmas, a village and municipality in the Khachmaz District of Azerbaijan
- Kënga Magjike, annual music competition organised by Albanian television broadcaster Televizioni Klan

== See also ==
- Kanga (disambiguation)
