= Peter Galloway =

British Anglican priest and historian

The Reverend Canon Peter Galloway LVO OBE JP FSA
- Canon Emeritus of the Chapels Royal
- Church: Church of England
- Diocese: Royal Peculiar
- In office: 2008 – 2019
- Predecessor: Revd Prebendary Bill Scott
- Successor: Revd Canon Thomas Woodhouse

Orders
- Ordination: 1983 (deacon); 1984 (priest)

Personal details
- Born: Peter John Galloway; 19 July 1954 (age 72)
- Denomination: Anglicanism
- Residence: London
- Education: Goldsmiths' College, London; St Stephen's House, Oxford; King's College, London

Peter John Galloway, LVO, OBE, JP, FSA (born 19 July 1954), is an Anglican priest and writer about British orders of chivalry as well as ecclesiastical and architectural history.

Galloway served as Chaplain of the Queen's Chapel of the Savoy ex officio of the Royal Victorian Order from 2008 to 2019, and is a Visiting Professor of Brunel University London.

== Early life and education ==
Of Scottish descent, born on 19 July 1954, Galloway was educated at Westminster City School, an all-boys grammar school in London. He then went up to read history at Goldsmiths' College, University of London, graduating with a Bachelor of Arts (BA) degree in 1976. Matriculating in 1980 at the Anglo-Catholic theological college, St Stephen's House, Oxford, he trained for Holy Orders, before being ordained in 1983 in the Church of England. Galloway then pursued further studies in divinity at King's College, London, taking a doctorate of Philosophy (PhD) in 1987.

== Career ==
=== Ordained ministry ===
Galloway was ordained in the Church of England as a deacon in 1983 and as a priest in 1984. From 1983 to 1986, he served his curacy at St John's Wood Church in the diocese of London, serving a further curacy at St Giles in the Fields between 1986 and 1990. In 1990, he joined Emmanuel Church, West Hampstead as Priest-in-Charge, being appointed its Vicar in 1995. From 2002 to 2007, he served as Area Dean of North Camden (Hampstead).

In February 2008, Galloway left parish ministry upon appointment as Chaplain of the Queen's Chapel of the Savoy and the Royal Victorian Order. The Secretary for Church Livings of the Duchy of Lancaster, in June 2017, he was appointed a Canon of the Chapels Royal.

Galloway subsequently serves as an Honorary Assistant Priest at St Mary Abbot's Church in Kensington, London.

=== Academic career ===
During his curacies, Galloway taught religious studies at Arnold House School, an all-boys preparatory school in the City of Westminster and since 2008, he has been an honorary professor in politics and history at Brunel University London. He has also held leadership positions including as a Member of the Council of Goldsmiths' College from 1993 to 1999, and on the Council of the University of London from 1999 to 2008.

Galloway was Chairman of Governors of St. Olave's Grammar School in Orpington for seven years, working alongside the controversial head Aydin Önaç. He resigned in September 2017, stating "the role of chairman requires far more time and attention than I am presently able to give." A subsequent enquiry for Bromley Borough Council highlighted many irregularities during Önaç's tenure, including illegal exclusion of students between years 12 and 13.

== Personal life ==
In 2008, Galloway entered into a civil partnership with Michael Russell Stewart Turner.

He lives in London and is a member of the Athenaeum Club.

== Honours and awards ==
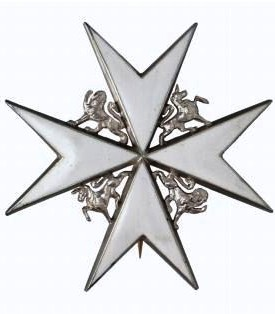

Appointed an Officer of the Order of St John (OStJ) in 1986, Galloway was promoted Chaplain of the Order of St John (ChStJ) in 1992, then Knight of the Order of St John (KStJ) in 1997.

Appointed an Officer of the Order of the British Empire (OBE) "for services to the Order of the British Empire" in the 1996 Queen's Birthday Honours, he became a Lieutenant of the Royal Victorian Order (LVO) in 2019.

On 11 May 2000, Galloway was elected a Fellow of the Society of Antiquaries of London (FSA).

== Selected works ==
- Galloway, Peter (1992). The Cathedrals of Ireland. Belfast: Institute of Irish Studies, Queen's University Belfast. ISBN 978-0853894520.
- Galloway, Peter (1999). The Cathedrals of Scotland. Scottish Cultural Press. ISBN 978-1840170269.
- Galloway, Peter (1999). The Most Illustrious Order: The Order of St Patrick and its Knights. London: Unicorn. ISBN 0-906290-23-6.
- Galloway, Peter (2002). Companions of Honour. London: Chancery Publications. ISBN 0-9543381-0-3.
- Galloway, Peter (2006). The Order of the Bath. London: Phillimore & Co Ltd. ISBN 978-1-86077-399-0.
- Galloway, Peter (2009). The Order of the Thistle. London: Spink & Son Ltd. ISBN 978-1-902040-92-9.
- Galloway, Peter (2014). Exalted, Eminent & Imperial: Honours of the British Raj. London: Spink & Son Ltd. ISBN 978-1907427336.
- Galloway, Peter (2016). The Royal Victorian Order. London: Spink & Son Ltd. ISBN 978-1907427763.
- Galloway, Peter (2017). The Most Excellent Order of the British Empire. Bromsgrove: Worcestershire Medal Service. ISBN 978-0-9955531-3-2.
- Galloway, Peter (2018). The Most Distinguished Order of St. Michael and St. George. London: Spink & Son Ltd. ISBN 978-1912667000.
