= Zoë Tryon =

British aristocrat and environmental activist

The Honourable Zoë Tryon
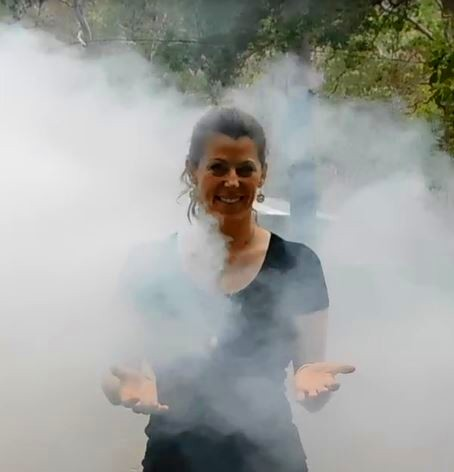
- Born: Zoë Elizabeth Tryon; 1 May 1974 (age 52); London, England
- Education: University of Sydney (BA Anthropology)
- Occupations: Ambassador for Amazon Watch, for the Achuar People and other Amazonian indigenous Peoples in Ecuador
- Years active: 2006–present
- Organisation: One of the Tribe
- Known for: Eldest child of Lord and Lady Tryon; eco-aristocrat promoting and arranging "Toxic Tours" into Ecuadorian Amazon
- Notable work: Arranged and featured in Australian Channel 7 Sunday Night Ecuadorian Amazon 'Bad Oil' (9 October 2011) exposé
- Parent(s): Anthony Tryon, 3rd Baron Tryon; Dale Harper
- Website: www.zoetryon.com

Zoë Elizabeth Tryon (born 1 May 1974) is the eldest child and daughter of Anthony Tryon, 3rd Baron Tryon, and Dale Tryon, Baroness Tryon. She is most notable for her work as an "eco-aristocratic" ambassador for Amazon Watch, the Achuar and the other indigenous peoples of Ecuadorian Amazon, particularly fundraising, she has also promoted and arranged 'big name' tours for celebrities, journalists, and others to support the cause of locally indigenous peoples, needing to clean up, or resist the toxic waste being left and ecological damage being done by "Big Oil" companies drilling and seeking to continue to drill the Amazon rainforests of Ecuador.

== Aristocrat ==
Tryon was born in 1974 to former banker the 3rd Baron Tryon (1940–2018) and Dale 'Kanga' Tryon (1948–1997), the eldest of four siblings, with a brother, Charles, born in 1976, and twins, Victoria and Edward, born in 1980. Lord Tryon was a part of the inner circle of the future King Charles III, then the Prince of Wales.

As the eldest child, Tryon has, over the years, appeared a number of times in magazines and media such as The Australian Women's Weekly in the 1970 and 1980s; British Harpers, Queen Magazine and Tatler in the early 1990s; Hello! and Business of Everything; and newspapers such as The Sydney Morning Herald and the Daily Mail.

== Eco-aristocrat ==
Tryon's eco-activism with the Achuar and indigenous peoples of Ecuadorian Amazon begins in 2006 when Tryon joined the co-founders of the Pachamama Alliance on a trip into the Ecuadorian Amazon to visit the Achuar; subsequently joining the Pachamama Alliance to facilitate and assist fund raise US$1.352 million.

Working with the Pachamama Alliance, Tryon had been introduced to—and invited by their president, Kistupa Paesto—to live among the Achuar. In 2007, Tryon moved to live within the Ecuadorian Amazon, working from the Kapawi Eco-Lodge to prepare for Achuar people to take ownership and manage the remote eco-lodge inside their territories. She next spent a brief period of time living and directly experiencing life amongst the Achuar; learning from the Achuar before becoming a guide. She guided David Mayer de Rothschild and his Mission Toxico team on a visit to Achuar territory, witnessing the accumulative and continuing ecological damage and long-term health effects of toxic waste being left behind by internationally sponsored drilling for oil in the Ecuadorian Amazon.

From 2008, Tryon had a full-time role joining Amazon Watch. raising funds and working principally from the Pachamama Alliance office in Ecuador's capital Quito, running eco-tourism trips and raising awareness of the international oil industry's continuing ecological damage, and general exploitation of Ecuadorian Amazon indigenous territories and peoples.

== Eco-activism ==
Tryon runs "Toxic Tours", leading groups of film makers, journalists, and environmentally-aware celebrities including the likes of Daryl Hannah, James Cameron and others, revealing the extent of Big Oil devastation, visiting some of more than 950 open toxic pits left by the Big Oil companies, visiting lawyers including Ecuadorian lawyer Pablo Fajardo running legal class actions against the likes of Chevron Corporation, striving to promote the cause of the Achuar and others seeking to repair, restore, save the Ecuadorian Amazon "one Toxic Tour at a time".

In 2011, Tryon approached and invited ex-60 Minutes journalist Mike Munro, an old friend of the family, to take on a toxic tour and, from that tour, produce a hard hitting piece on "Big Oil" in the Ecuadorian Amazon for Australian Channel 7's Sunday Night, which was ultimately produced and aired the 9 October 2011, titled "Bad Oil", portraying Tryon and "Big Oil" company Chevron in a "David and Goliath" US$8 billion battle to repair, restore, and save Ecuadorian Amazon from environmental catastrophe.

Tryon has also become a Champion for a "Clearwater" project for which she has been fundraising to assist pay the costs of people making Ecuadorian Amazon "Big Oil" contaminated waters drinkable.

After an 18-year lawsuit the indigenous people and the colonists won against the oil giant, but Chevron are refusing to pay to clear the more than 950 unlined pits full of oil and waste products which have been leaching into waterways for decades. Now the people are taking matters into their own hands and have created Clearwater.

— Zoë Tryon

By 2017, Tryon had formed her own international not-for-profit-organisation, called One of the Tribe, dedicated to promoting the rights of the Achuar and other indigenous peoples of Ecuador Amazon and still spending up to six months a year leading tours and immersing in the Ecuadorian Amazon pursuing her passion and life's work
