= Emmanuel Church, West Hampstead =

Emmanuel Church
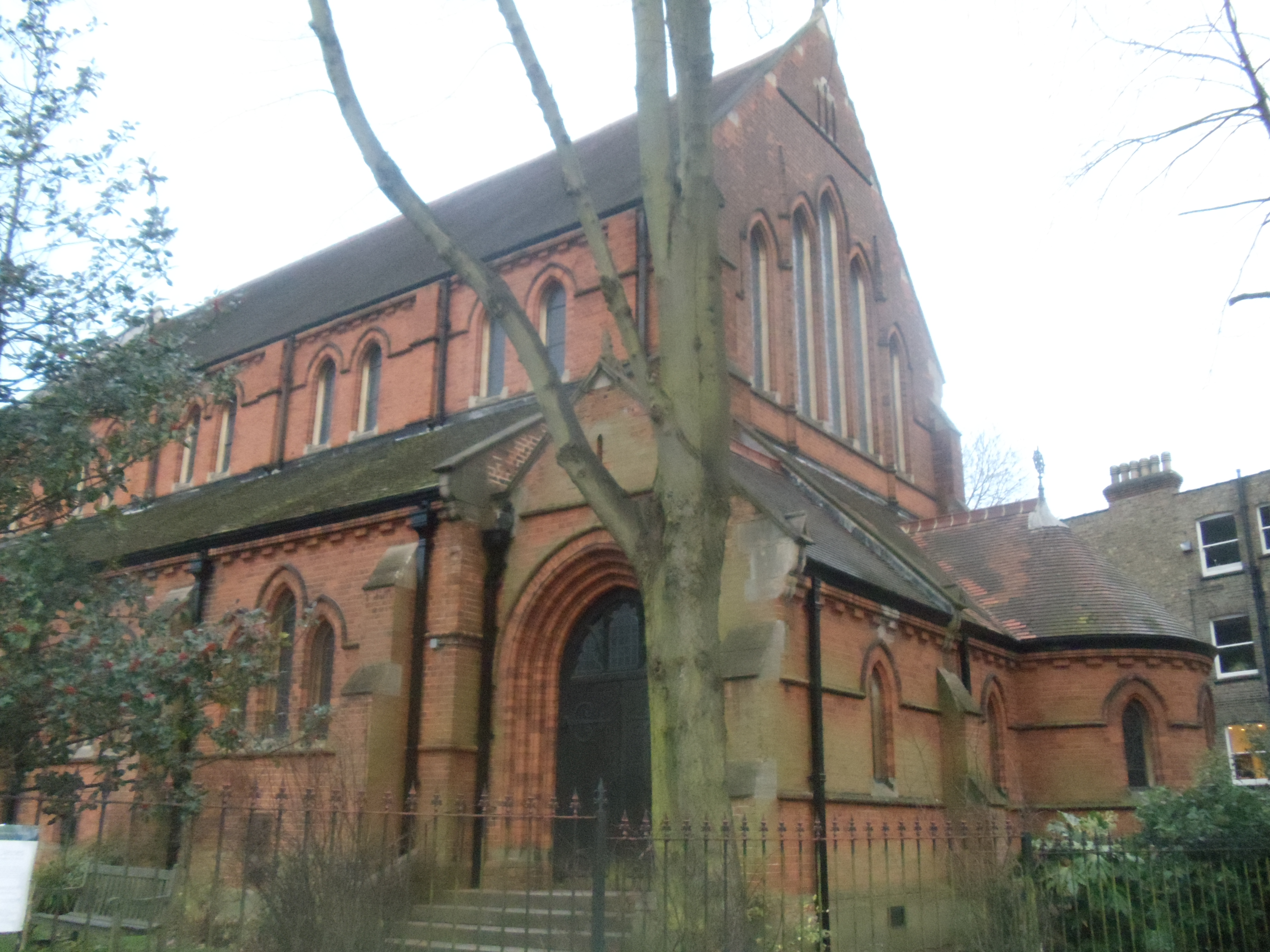
- Emmanuel Church
- 51.5527°N 0.1925°W
- Location: Lyncroft Gardens, West Hampstead, London NW6 1JU
- Country: England
- Denomination: Church of England
- Churchmanship: Inclusive Anglican-Catholic
- Website: emmanuelnw6.com/

Architecture
- Heritage designation: Grade II
- Designated: 11 January 1999
- Architect: J. A. Thomas
- Architectural type: Gothic Revival architecture
- Completed: 29 June 1903

Administration
- Diocese: London

Emmanuel Church is a historic Grade II church in West Hampstead, a suburb of London, England.

== Location ==
The church is located on the corner of Lyncroft Gardens and Fortune Green Road, just off West End Green.

== History ==
Services started in a schoolroom at West End Green in 1846. However, the church was formally founded in 1875.

The current building was designed by architect John Alick Thomas in the Gothic Revival architectural style. Construction began on 19 June 1897 and was completed on 29 June 1903. It was built with red bricks. The south chapel inside the church has a painting by Frank O. Salisbury.

The previous church building was on Mill Lane, with only its front wall onto the road remaining today, replaced by Cholmley Gardens (flats). Its original church hall facing West Hampstead Primary School is now the Dornfell Road Community Centre.

The church is still active. Services are conducted every weekday and eucharists every Sunday.

== Heritage significance ==
The church building has been listed as Grade II by English Heritage since 11 January 1999.

== Notable people ==
- Several noteworthy musicians have served as organist at Emmanuel Church:
  - Martin Shaw (1894–1902)
  - Henry Cope Colles (1903–06)
  - Harold Darke (1906–1911)
- Peter Galloway, served as Priest-in-Charge (1990–1995) and Vicar (1995–2008)
