= Fleetwood Edwards =

English cricketer and British Army officer (1842–1910)

Lieutenant-Colonel The Right Honourable Sir Fleetwood Isham Edwards GCVO KCB ISO
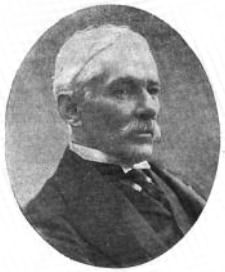
- In The Sketch, 6 March 1901

Keeper of the Privy Purse
- In office 1895–1901
- Monarch: Queen Victoria
- Preceded by: Sir Henry Ponsonby
- Succeeded by: Sir Dighton Probyn

Personal details
- Born: 21 April 1842 Thames Ditton, Surrey
- Died: 14 August 1910 (aged 68) The Manor House, Lindfield, Sussex
- Spouse(s): Edith Smith-Masters (18??-1873; her death); Mary Routledge Majendie (m. 1880)
- Education: Royal Military Academy Sandhurst

Lieutenant-Colonel Sir Fleetwood Isham Edwards GCVO KCB ISO (21 April 1842 – 14 August 1910) was Keeper of the Privy Purse to Queen Victoria from 1895 to 1901.

== Early life and personal life ==
After attending Harrow School, Edwards entered Royal Military Academy Sandhurst in 1861. He received a commission in the Royal Engineers in 1863. Edwards was married to Edith Smith-Masters, who died 9 March 1873. He remarried in 1880 to Mary Routledge Majendie.

== Royal service ==
Edwards served as Aide-de-camp to the Governor of Bermuda between 1867 and 1869, an Assistant Inspector of Works at the Royal Arsenal from 1870 to 1873, then as aide-de-camp to the Inspector General of Fortifications from 1873 to 1878, and later was attached to the special embassy at the Congress of Berlin in 1878.

Edwards served as a Groom-in-Waiting to Queen Victoria from 1880 and 1895, whereupon he became Keeper of the Privy Purse until her death in 1901. He was designated as an Extra Equerry to the Queen from 1888 until her death. He served as an executor of Queen Victoria's will in 1901.

During his time as a member of Queen Victoria's court, a zebra died under the care of Edwards, which was said to greatly annoy the Queen. Edwards was blamed for not contacting London Zoo, and the animal had to be buried at Windsor Castle.

Between 1901 and 1910, he served as a Serjeant-at-Arms in the House of Lords to King Edward VII. He was appointed Paymaster of the Household in 1910 to King George V, which duty he performed until his death later that year.

== Honours ==
- Order of the Bath
  - Companion of the Order of the Bath (CB) – 28 April 1882
  - Knight Commander of the Order of the Bath (KCB)
- Knight Grand Cross of the Royal Victorian Order (GCVO) – 2 February 1901
- Prussian Order of the Red Eagle, 2nd Class, with Star
- Trustee of Queen Victoria's Jubilee Institute for Nurses

== Cricket career ==
Edwards narrowly failed to get into the first XI during his time at Harrow School. He played a number of matches for the Royal Engineers, and for the Knickerbockers.

In 1866, he made his only first-class cricket appearance, playing for I Zingari, a club he likely joined due to his close links with the Ponsonby family; many of whom he worked alongside at court. During this match, against a Gentlemen of the South including W. G. Grace and two of his brothers, Edwards top-scored for I Zingari in the first-innings, remaining 27 not out at the close of the innings. He only managed to score 12 runs in the second-innings, and his side lost by 121 runs to the Gentlemen.

In 1870, he became a member of the Marylebone Cricket Club (MCC) and he continued to play amateur cricket for I Zingari and other sides until 1872.

Court offices
Preceded by Sir Henry Ponsonby	Keeper of the Privy Purse; 1895–1901	Succeeded by Sir Dighton Probyn
