= Arnold House School =

Location
- 1-3 Loudoun Road; London, NW8 0LH; England

Information
- Type: Preparatory day school
- Motto: "Conquer we shall"
- Religious affiliation: Church of England
- Established: 1905
- Local authority: City of Westminster
- Department for Education URN: 101156 Tables
- Headmaster: Vivian W P Thomas
- Gender: Boys
- Age: 3 to 13
- Enrolment: 250~
- Colours: Red, Green
- Website: http://www.arnoldhouse.co.uk/

Arnold House School is a preparatory school for boys in the St John's Wood district of Westminster, Greater London, England, United Kingdom. It consists of a Junior School (Years 1–4) and Senior School (Years 5–8).

== History ==
Arnold House School was founded in 1905 by Miss Hanson with nine pupils. Hanson opened the school with the intention of showing that a headmistress was equally capable of preparing boys for public schools. By the time she stepped down as Headmistress, the school was flourishing. It became a charitable trust in 1969.

== Coat of arms ==
Coat of arms of Arnold House School
Notes Granted 18 May 2004. Crest On a wreath Argent and Gules, a stork Or beaked and legged Gules, resting the dexter foot on a propeller Vert. Escutcheon Per saltire Gules and Vert, a cross flory Argent between twelve bezants in saltire. Motto 'Conquer We Shall'

In celebration of the school's centenary in 2005, it applied for and was granted a coat of arms by the College of Arms. The school motto, "Conquer We Shall", is derived from a poem by Robert Herrick:

Conquer we shall, but first we must contend,
'Tis not the strife that crowns us, but the end.

— Robert Herrick

== Notable former pupils ==
- Jack Clayton, film director
- Giles Cooper, playwright and dramatist
- Freddie Fox, stage, film and television actor
- Roland Glasser, literary translator
- John Godley, 3rd Baron Kilbracken
- Hughie Green, television host
- Daniel Hahn, writer, editor and translator
- Lord Lucan
- Michael McIntyre, comedian
- Jonathan Miller, theatre and opera director
- Jon Moss, drummer
- Adam Raphael, journalist and author
- James Rhodes, pianist
- Jon Speelman, chess player
- David Say, former Bishop of Rochester
- David Watson, musician
- Max Fosh, English YouTuber and comedian

== Notable former staff ==
- Peter Galloway, former religious studies teacher
