= George Villiers, 6th Earl of Clarendon =

British politician (1877–1955)

The Right Honourable The Earl of Clarendon KG GCMG GCVO GCStJ PC DL
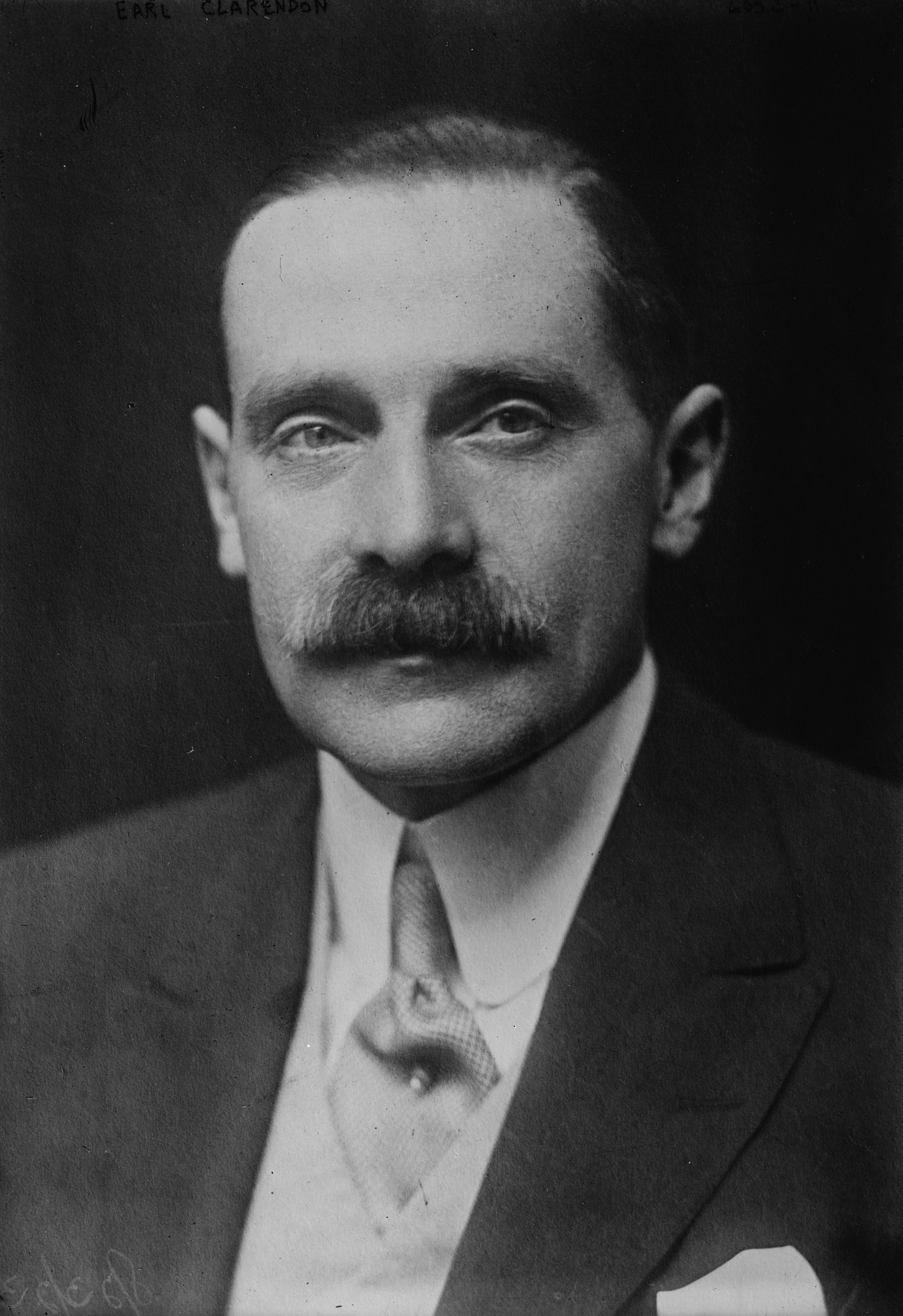

5th Governor-General of South Africa
- In office 26 January 1931 – 5 April 1937
- Monarchs: George V; Edward VIII; George VI
- Prime Minister: J. B. M. Hertzog
- Preceded by: The Earl of Athlone
- Succeeded by: Sir Patrick Duncan

Personal details
- Born: George Herbert Hyde Villiers; 7 June 1877 Dublin, Ireland
- Died: 13 December 1955 (aged 78) London, England
- Party: Conservative
- Spouse: Adeline Verena Isabel Cocks (m. 1905)
- Children: 3
- Parent(s): Edward Villiers, 5th Earl of Clarendon; Lady Caroline Agar
- Occupation: Politician, Colonial administrator

Garter-encircled shield of arms of George Villiers, 6th Earl of Clarendon, KG, as displayed on his Order of the Garter stall plate in St. George's Chapel, viz. Argent on a cross gules five escallops or.

George Herbert Hyde Villiers, 6th Earl of Clarendon (7 June 1877 – 13 December 1955), styled Lord Hyde from 1877 to 1914, was a British Conservative politician from the Villiers family. He served as Governor-General of the Union of South Africa from 1931 to 1937.

== Background ==
Clarendon was the only son of Edward Hyde Villiers, 5th Earl of Clarendon and his wife Lady Caroline Elizabeth Agar, daughter of James Agar, 3rd Earl of Normanton. George William Frederick Villiers, 4th Earl of Clarendon, three times Foreign Secretary, was his grandfather.

== Political career ==
Lord Hyde was in November 1902 appointed an extra aide-de-camp to the Earl of Dudley, Lord Lieutenant of Ireland.

Clarendon took his seat on the Conservative benches in the House of Lords on his father's death in 1914. When Bonar Law became Prime Minister in 1922 he appointed Clarendon Captain of the Honourable Corps of Gentlemen-at-Arms (government chief whip in the House of Lords), a position he also held under Stanley Baldwin until January 1924, and again from December 1924 to 1925. He then served as the first Under-Secretary of State for Dominion Affairs until 1927. In 1931 Clarendon was appointed Governor-General of South Africa, in which position he remained until 1937. During his tenure as Governor-General of South Africa, he also served as Chief Scout of South Africa. Clarendon High School for Girls and its associated schools, Clarendon Primary School and Clarendon Preparatory School in East London, South Africa are named after him.

Clarendon became Lord Chamberlain in 1938 and served until the death of King George VI in 1952. He was sworn of the Privy Council in 1931 and made a Knight Companion of the Garter in 1937.

== Family ==
Lord Clarendon married Adeline Verena Ishbel Cocks, daughter of Herbert Haldane Somers Cocks, in 1905.

They had three children:

- George Villiers, Lord Hyde, killed in a shooting accident in South Africa in 1935, leaving a son George Frederick Laurence and a posthumous daughter, Rosemary.
- (Nina) Joan Villiers, Lady Newman
- (William) Nicholas Villiers.

He died in December 1955, aged 78. His eldest son George Villiers, Lord Hyde, had been killed in a shooting accident in 1935; the earldom was inherited by George's son Laurence.

== Honours ==
- (England) He was awarded the Freedom of the Borough of Watford on 28 July 1924.
- He was made a Knight Grand Cross of the Order of St Michael and St George on 2 December 1930, which would normally allow him the style "Sir", but this was outranked by his peerage and so was not used. It gave him the post-nominal letters "GCMG" for life.
- He was sworn in as a member of His Majesty's Most Honourable Privy Council in 1931. This allowed him the style "The Right Honourable" and the post-nominal letters "PC" for life.
- He was made a Knight Companion of the Order of the Garter in 1937 by King George VI, which would normally allow him the style "Sir", but this was outranked by his peerage and so was not used. It gave him the post-nominal letters "KG" for life.
- He was made a Knight Grand Cross of the Royal Victorian Order on 8 June 1939 by King George VI, which would normally allow him the style "Sir", but this was outranked by his peerage and so was not used. It gave him the post-nominal letters "GCVO" for life. He also served as Chancellor of the Order from 1938 to 1952.
- He was made a Bailiff Grand Cross of the Order of St John on 18 June 1940. Within the Order, this allowed him the post-nominal letters "GCStJ" for life. He also served as Prior of the Order from 1943 to 1946.
- He was awarded the Royal Victorian Chain on 21 October 1952 by Queen Elizabeth II.
- (England) He was appointed a Deputy Lieutenant of Hertfordshire. This gave him the post-nominal letters "DL" for life.

Political offices
Preceded by The Lord Ranksborough	Lord-in-waiting; 1921 – 1922	New government
Preceded by The Lord Colebrooke	Captain of the Gentlemen-at-Arms; 1922 – 1924	Succeeded by The Earl of Dunmore
Preceded by The Lord Colebrooke and The Lord Hylton	Government Chief Whip in the House of Lords; 1922 – 1924	Succeeded by The Lord Muir-Mackenzie
Preceded by The Earl of Dunmore	Captain of the Gentlemen-at-Arms; 1924 – 1925	Succeeded by The Earl of Plymouth
Preceded by The Lord Muir-Mackenzie	Government Chief Whip in the House of Lords; 1924 – 1925	Succeeded by The Earl of Plymouth
New office	Under-Secretary of State for Dominion Affairs; 1925 – 1927	Succeeded by The Lord Lovat
Preceded by The Earl of Athlone	Governor-General of South Africa; 1931 – 1937	Succeeded by Sir Patrick Duncan
Court offices
Preceded by The Earl of Cromer	Lord Chamberlain; 1938 – 1952	Succeeded by The Earl of Scarbrough
Media offices
Preceded by Jack Pease	Chairman of the BBC Board of Governors; 1927–1930	Succeeded by John Henry Whitley
Peerage of Great Britain
Preceded by Edward Villiers	Earl of Clarendon; 1914 – 1955	Succeeded by George Villiers
