= John Parsons (accountant) =

British accountant and courtier

Sir John Christopher Parsons, KCVO (born 1946) is a British accountant and courtier.

== Early life ==
Born in 1946, Parsons was educated at Trinity College, Cambridge. He later qualified as an accountant and worked for Dowty Group from 1968 to 1972, when he joined the accountants Peat Marwick Mitchell.

== Royal household ==
Parsons was appointed Assistant Treasurer to the Queen in 1985 and in 1988 was promoted to Deputy Treasurer to the Queen and Deputy Keeper of the Privy Purse, serving in that office until 2002. He has since been Treasurer of Peterborough Cathedral (2004–14).

== Honours ==
For his service to the Queen, Parsons was appointed a Lieutenant of the Royal Victorian Order (LVO) in the 1992 New Year Honours and promoted twice, six years later to Commander (CVO) and then in 2002 to Knight Commander (KCVO).

== Marriage and children ==
Parsons married Hon Anne Constance Manningham-Buller (born 13 August 1951), daughter of Reginald Manningham-Buller, 1st Viscount Dilhorne, on 20 February 1982. They have three children:

- Michael Reginald Parsons (born 1983)
- David Guy Parsons (born 1985)
- Lilah Veronica Parsons (born 1988)
