= William Nye (official) =

British courtier and civil servant (born 1966)

William Nye LVO

Secretary General of the General Synod of the Church of England
- Incumbent
- Assumed office December 2015
- Preceded by: William Fittall

Principal Private Secretary to the Prince of Wales
- In office September 2011 – November 2015
- Preceded by: Sir Michael Peat
- Succeeded by: Clive Alderton

Personal details
- Born: 28 March 1966 (age 60) Amersham, Buckinghamshire, England
- Citizenship: United Kingdom
- Spouse: Katherine Bartlett (m. 2006)
- Children: One
- Education: Christ's Hospital
- Alma mater: Clare College, Cambridge

William James Nye, LVO (born 28 March 1966) is a British courtier and civil servant. Since December 2015, he has been Secretary-General of the Archbishops' Council and Secretary General of the General Synod of the Church of England. From 2011 to 2015, he served as Principal Private Secretary to Charles, Prince of Wales and Camilla, Duchess of Cornwall.

== Early life and education ==
Nye was born on 28 March 1966 in Amersham, Buckinghamshire, England. He was educated at Christ's Hospital, a private boarding school in Horsham, Sussex. He studied economics at Clare College, Cambridge, and graduated from the University of Cambridge with a Bachelor of Arts (BA) degree in 1987. He then studied economics at Yale University in the United States, and graduated with a Master of Arts (MA) degree in 1989.

== Career ==
After university, he joined the British Civil Service, and came to hold a number of senior appointments at the Home Office and the Treasury, his last being that of Director in the National Security Secretariat at the Cabinet Office.

Nye succeeded Sir Michael Peat as Principal Private Secretary to Charles, Prince of Wales and his wife Camilla, Duchess of Cornwall (Peat's resignation was announced on 24 January 2011). He took up the appointment on 12 September 2011. In November of that year, it was reported that Nye would not be given the use of the Kensington Palace apartment that Peat vacated, nor would Nye be provided grace-and-favour housing of any kind. He "has overall responsibility for the Prince’s household and also keeps an eye on the running of the Duchy of Cornwall, his private estate, and his residences at Highgrove and Birkhall." and served as a trustee of The Prince of Wales's Charitable Foundation. On 10 June 2015, it was announced that he would stand down from his role as Private Secretary at the end of November 2015.

=== Church of England ===
In June 2015, Nye was announced as the next Secretary-General of the Archbishops' Council and Secretary General of the General Synod of the Church of England. He took up the role on 1 December 2015. According to Private Eye in 2020, "Nye recently survived a complaint about the leadership of the church's safeguarding" following strong criticism in the report on the Church of England by the Independent Inquiry into Child Sexual Abuse. Private Eye also reported that "The Archbishop's Council ... is currently being investigated by the regulatory compliance division of the Charity Commission".

In June 2023, the Independent Safeguarding Board (ISB) was scrapped: it had been formed in 2021 to hold the Church of England to account for safeguarding issues. An independent review of the scrapping showed that "significant harm" had been caused to survivors of abuse and that it was Nye's decision to terminate the ISB.

In July 2026, Nye spoke ahead of a General Synod vote on a motion proposed by Reverend Valerie Plumb calling on the Church Commissioners to rewild 30% of church-owned land by 2030. As secretary general of the Archbishops' Council, Nye argued that the motion was inconsistent with the church's legal duties and its responsibility to secure long-term capital growth. The motion was ultimately blocked, with Synod instead passing an amendment proposed by the Rt Rev Graham Usher, the lead bishop for the environment, setting out alternative steps that did not include a measurable rewilding target.

== Personal life ==
In 2006, Nye married Katherine Bartlett. Together they have one daughter.

Nye is a member of the Church of England. He has served on the parochial church council (PCC) of St Cyprian's Church in Marylebone for more than 20 years and as churchwarden for ten.

== Honours ==
In the 2015 New Year Honours, Nye was appointed a Lieutenant of the Royal Victorian Order (LVO) in recognition of his service as Principal Private Secretary to The Prince of Wales and The Duchess of Cornwall.

Court offices
Preceded by Sir Michael Peat	Private Secretary to the Prince of Wales; 2011–2015	Succeeded by Clive Alderton
