= Michael Peat =

British accountant and secretary of Prince Charles

Sir Michael Charles Gerrard Peat GCVO FCA (born 16 November 1949) is an English retired accountant and courtier. He was the Principal Private Secretary to King Charles III and Queen Camilla between 2002 and 2011 when they were Prince of Wales and Duchess of Cornwall.

== Life and career ==
Peat was born in 1949 and is great-grandson of William Barclay Peat, founder of the accountancy firm of Peat Marwick. He was educated at Eton College and Trinity College, University of Oxford, where he received an MA degree. He later attended the INSEAD in Fontainebleau, France, and obtained an MBA degree in 1977. He became an Associate Chartered Accountant in 1975 and a Fellow of the Institute of Chartered Accountants (FCA) in 1985.

Peat joined Peat Marwick Mitchell in 1972, became a partner in 1985. He led a 1986 study into the financial management of the Royal Household. From 1987 to 1990, he was the auditor of the Privy Purse and administrative adviser to the Royal Household. In 1990, he was appointed Director of Finance and Property Services of the Royal Household, while remaining a partner at KPMG. He retired from KPMG in 1993, and in 1996 was appointed Keeper of the Privy Purse and Treasurer to the Queen and Receiver General of the Duchy of Lancaster. He retired from these positions in 2002, when he was appointed as private secretary to the Prince of Wales, taking control of the Office of the Prince of Wales. In 2005 he was made Principal Private Secretary to the Prince of Wales and the Duchess of Cornwall.

Peat stepped down as the Prince of Wales' private secretary in January 2011. He continued to undertake investment and financial projects for the Prince and provide advice on a part-time basis. Peat was replaced as principal private secretary by William Nye, formerly director of the National Security Secretariat, Cabinet Office and a career civil servant with experience at the Home Office and the Treasury.

Peat became the new independent chairman of GEMS Education's Board of Directors in 2014.

== Honours ==
Peat was appointed a Commander of the Royal Victorian Order (CVO) in the 1994 Birthday Honours, later elevated to a Knight Commander (KCVO) in the 1998 New Year Honours, and subsequently promoted to a Knight Grand Cross (GCVO) of the same order, effective on 17 October 2011. Peat is a freemason.

Court offices
Preceded by Major Sir Shane Blewitt	Keeper of the Privy Purse; 1996–2002	Succeeded by Sir Alan Reid
Preceded by Sir Stephen Lamport	Private Secretary to the Prince of Wales; 2002–2011	Succeeded by William Nye
