= Durnford, Wiltshire =

Village in Wiltshire, England

Coordinates: 51.141°N 1.808°W

Durnford
- Civil parish
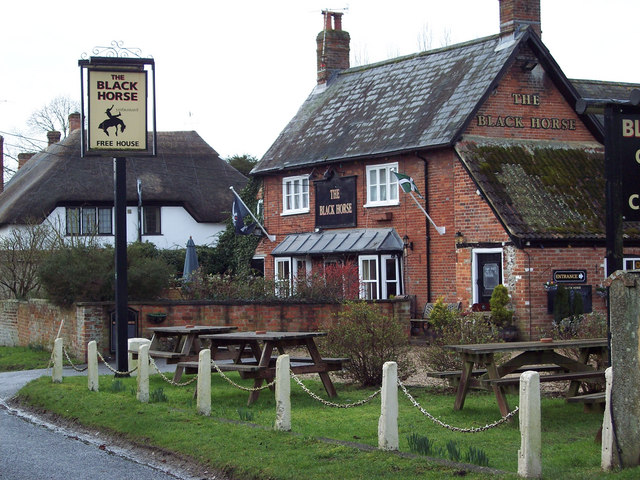
- The Black Horse, Great Durnford, 2007

- Location within Wiltshire
- Interactive map showing the parish boundary
- Population: 392 (2021 census)
- OS grid reference: SU135380
- Unitary authority: Wiltshire
- Ceremonial county: Wiltshire
- Region: South West
- Country: England
- Sovereign state: United Kingdom
- Post town: Salisbury
- Postcode district: SP4
- Dialling code: 01722
- Police: Wiltshire
- Fire: Dorset and Wiltshire
- Ambulance: South Western
- UK Parliament: East Wiltshire

Durnford is a civil parish in Wiltshire, England, between Salisbury and Amesbury. It lies in the Woodford Valley and is bounded to the west by the Salisbury Avon and to the east by the A345 Salisbury-Amesbury road. The parish church and Little Durnford Manor are grade I listed. The main settlement is Great Durnford, 2.5 miles (4.0 km) southwest of Amesbury. To the south, on the bank of the Avon, are the small settlements of Netton, Salterton and Little Durnford.

== History ==
Evidence of prehistoric activity in the area includes two bowl barrows (Neolithic or Bronze Age) on high ground south of Great Durnford village, and Ogbury camp (Bronze Age or Iron Age), a hilltop enclosure on the summit of a ridge close to the village. Durnford is within the Stonehenge, Avebury and Associated Sites World Heritage Site, and Great Durnford lies some 2.7 miles (4.3 km) southeast of the Stonehenge monument.

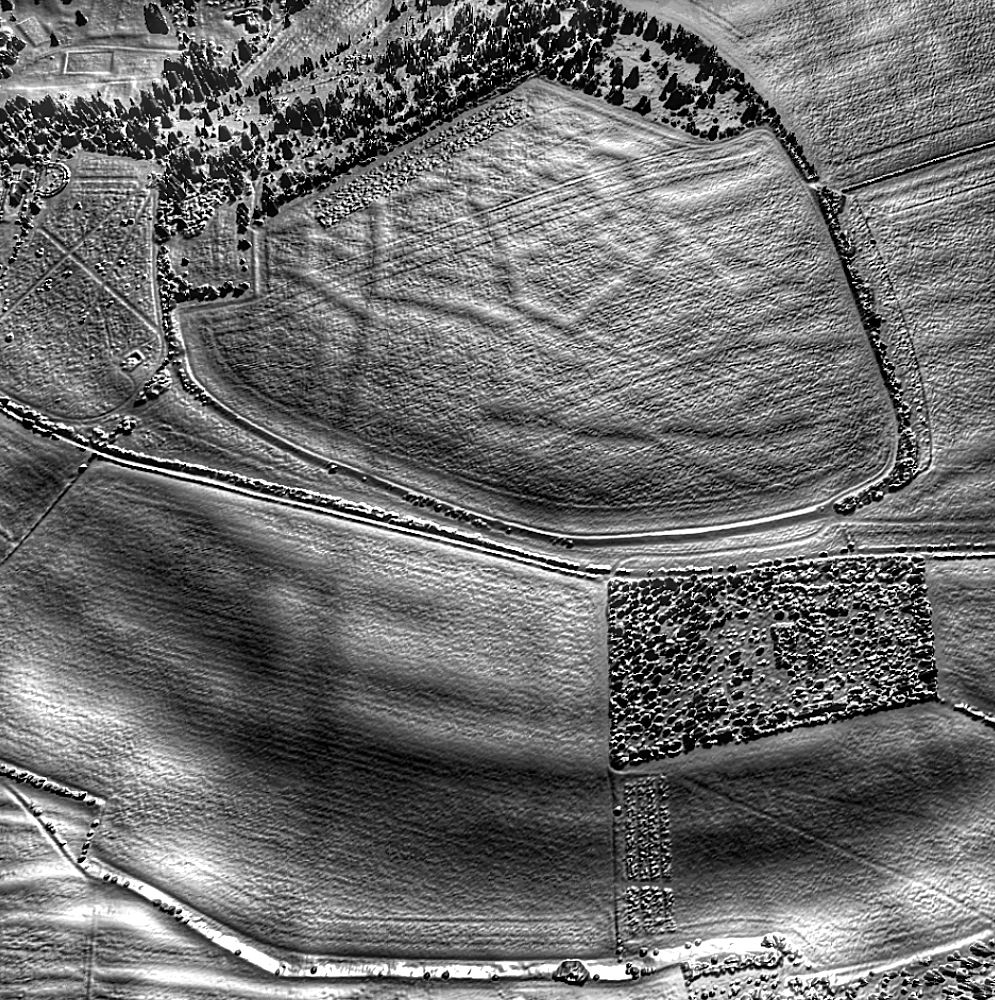
A lidar view of Ogbury camp.

The Domesday Book of 1086 recorded 71 households at Durnford and a small settlement at Netton. The ancient parish of Durnford included Normanton, north of Great Durnford on the west bank. This part was transferred to Wilsford cum Lake parish in 1885.

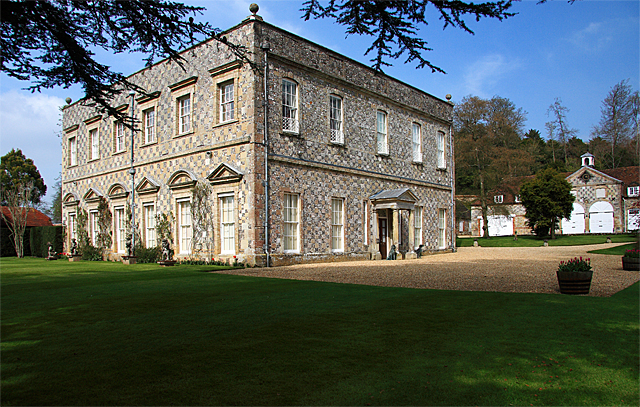
Little Durnford Manor House

Little Durnford Manor was built in the late 17th century and remodelled c. 1720-1740. The house is grade I listed and has a dining room described by Pevsner as "a splendid mid C18 room with a proud chimneypiece and wall panels of tapestry framed in plaster". There was probably a medieval village at Little Durnford, beside the river, but this had disappeared by the 18th century after parkland was created for the manor house.

The manor house at Great Durnford was built in brick in the 18th century, then acquired in 1904 by the politician George Tryon, who altered and extended the house in 1912–13, and became Baron Tryon of Durnford in 1940. Dreda Tryon, wife of George's son Charles, ran a boarding preparatory school for girls at the house from 1942 until 1992.

A national school opened in 1844 at Netton, by the turning for High Post, and was rebuilt in 1872. Attendance declined in the 20th century and the school closed in 1975. There was a small 19th-century school at Great Durnford, near the entrance to the Manor House.

A Wesleyan Methodist chapel was built in 1895 at Netton, next to the school, replacing a nearby meeting house certified in 1812. The chapel closed sometime between 1974 and 1988.

=== High Post airfield ===
The Wiltshire Light Aeroplane and County Club opened in 1931 at High Post Aerodrome, southeast of Great Durnford. By 1936 the Wiltshire School of Flying was here, using a grass landing area expanded to 110 acres (45 ha), with workshops for aircraft maintenance and a hotel and offices building on the main road.

In 1940, the aerodrome became RAF High Post and was the home of the Lysanders of 112 Squadron RCAF. Later in 1940, it was chosen (along with RAF Chattis Hill, Hampshire) as an assembly and test site for Spitfire aircraft built in and around Salisbury, after the destruction of factories in the Southampton area. Records list approximately 495 Spitfires assembled at High Post in 1941–43. In the spring of 1944, High Post became Vickers' flight development site, and the minor road which formed the southern boundary of the airfield was closed to allow extension of its grass runways to the southwest. Prototypes of the Spiteful, intended to succeed the Spitfire, and later the Seafang, were built here.

High Post closed in 1947 because it lay under the approach to Boscombe Down. Vickers moved to the former RAF Chilbolton and the School of Flying, which had reopened in 1946, moved to Thruxton in 1947. The southern section of the airfield reverted to farmland while the northern part continues in light industrial use. The hotel was replaced by a larger building which (as of 2016) trades as the Stones Hotel.

== Governance ==
Durnford is a civil parish with a parish council of seven members.

For local government, Durnford is in Wiltshire unitary district. For elections to Wiltshire Council, Durnford is in the Till Valley electoral division. Historically, Durnford was in Amesbury Hundred. Under the two-tier system of local government, Durnford was in Amesbury Rural District from 1894 to 1974, and then in Salisbury District until Wiltshire became a unitary district in 2009.

For elections to the Parliament of the United Kingdom, Durnford is in the East Wiltshire constituency. Before the 2024 election, it was in Salisbury constituency.

== Demographics ==
Census population of Durnford parish
Census	Population	Female	Male	Households	Source
2001	348	186	162	153	
2011	368	201	167	156	
2021	392	215	177	166	

== Parish church ==
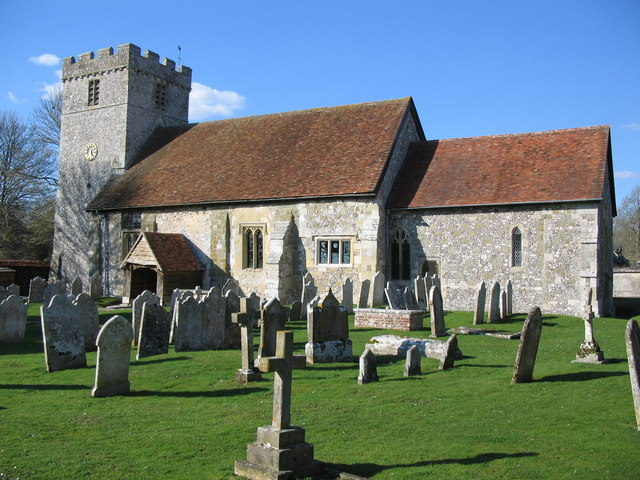
St Andrew's Church

The Church of England parish church of St Andrew, at Great Durnford, was built in the 12th century. Pevsner described it as "a Norman church, remarkably spacious and remarkably rich in furnishings". The north and south doorways are Norman, indicating that the width of the nave has not changed since that time. The chancel and tower are from the 13th century, while the windows are 15th and 16th. Inside are wall paintings, a 12th-century font, a pulpit of 1619, and pews from the 15th or 16th centuries.

The tower has an Angelus bell from the 14th century and four 17th-century bells. The church was designated as Grade I listed in 1958. In 1974 the parish was united with St Michael's at Wilsford and All Saints' at Woodford; today the parish is known as Woodford Valley with Archers Gate.

== Amenities ==
Great Durnford has a pub, the Great Bustard.

National Cycle Route 45 passes through Salterton and Netton on its Salisbury-Amesbury section. The Orange Way long-distance footpath also takes a south–north route, passing through Great Durnford, while the Monarch's Way crosses the river from Lower Woodford to Salterton and proceeds over Salterton Down.

== Notable residents ==
- George Tryon, 1st Baron Tryon (1871–1940), Conservative politician who served in a number of ministerial positions in the inter-war years.
- Charles Tryon, 2nd Baron Tryon (1906–1976), peer, Army officer, and a member of the royal household. Assistant keeper of the Privy Purse to King George VI, keeper of the Privy Purse and treasurer to Queen Elizabeth II and permanent lord-in-waiting.
- Anthony Tryon, 3rd Baron Tryon (1941–2018) and Dale Tryon, Baroness Tryon (1948–1997), friends of Prince Charles.
