= Peter Miles (courtier) =

British soldier, businessman and courtier

Sir Peter Tremayne Miles KCVO (26 June 1924 – 15 October 2013) was a British Army officer, businessman and courtier in the Household of Elizabeth II.

== Biography ==
Miles was born in Long Ashton, Somerset, the son of Lt-Col Edward Miles MC and Mary Gibbs and a descendant of Philip John Miles. He was educated at Eton College before going to the Royal Military College, Sandhurst, from where he commissioned into the Royal Dragoons on 25 June 1944. He saw active service with the Royal Armoured Corps in the Second World War.

Between 1959 and 1980, Miles worked as the director of Gerrard and Reid Ltd. He subsequently joined the Royal Household, serving as Keeper of the Privy Purse, Treasurer to Elizabeth II and Receiver-General of the Duchy of Lancaster between 1981 and 1987. He was also Secretary of the Royal Victorian Order during the same period. He was appointed Knight Commander of the Royal Victorian Order in the 1986 New Year Honours. He was appointed an Extra Equerry to the Queen in 1988.

He married Philippa Helen Tremlett, daughter of Edmund Bernard Marcellin Tremlett, on 25 July 1956. Together they had three children.

Court offices
Preceded by Sir Rennie Maudslay	Keeper of the Privy Purse; 1981–1987	Succeeded by Sir Shane Blewitt
Preceded by Sir Rennie Maudslay	Treasurer to the Queen; 1981–1987	Succeeded by Sir Shane Blewitt
