= Keeper of the Privy Purse =

Treasurer to the British monarchy

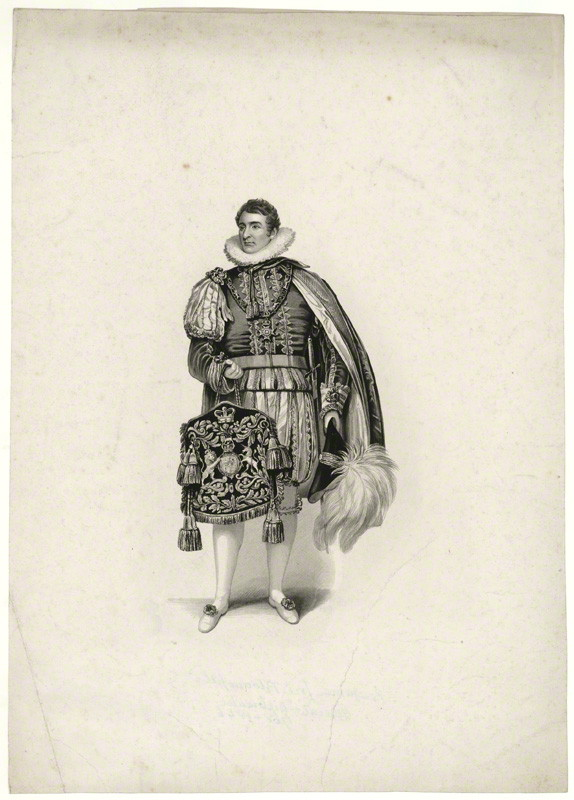
Lord Bloomfield as Keeper of the Privy Purse, carrying a ceremonial purse at the coronation of George IV in July 1821

The Keeper of the Privy Purse and Treasurer to the King/Queen (or Financial Secretary to the King/Queen) is responsible for the financial management of the Royal Household of the Sovereign of the United Kingdom. At coronations in recent centuries, the holders of this office invariably carried a ceremonial purse, embroidered with the royal coat of arms.

== Present day ==
The officeholder is assisted by the Deputy Treasurer to the King/Queen for the management of the Sovereign Grant, currently Sally O'Neill (formerly Chief Operating Officer of the Royal Opera House).

The officeholder is also assisted by the Deputy Keeper of the Privy Purse for semi-private concerns, such as racing stables, the Royal Philatelic Collection, Royal Ascot, the Chapel Royal, the Page of Honour, Military Knights of Windsor, Royal Maundy, the Royal Victorian Order, grace and favour apartments, and the Duchy of Lancaster. These are funded from the Privy Purse, which is drawn largely from the Duchy of Lancaster and the Duchy of Cornwall.

The Keeper of the Privy Purse meets the Sovereign at least weekly. Among the duties is the allocation of grace and favour apartments at the royal palaces. The current Keeper of the Privy Purse and Treasurer to the King is James Chalmers.

== History ==
In 1920, as part of a re-arrangement of duties in the Royal Household of King George V, the Keeper of His Majesty's Privy Purse was retitled 'Treasurer to the King and Keeper of the Privy Purse'; at the same time the Secretary of the Privy Purse became 'Assistant Treasurer to the King, and Secretary of the Privy Purse'. In 1922, the latter office-holder (Sir John Chapple) was redesignated as 'Deputy Keeper of the Privy Purse', though he resigned from office the following year. His successor was (once again) appointed 'Secretary of His Majesty's Privy Purse'; while, two months later, a separate 'Deputy Treasurer to the King' was appointed. Subsequently, these two officers served, under the 'Treasurer to the King and Keeper of the Privy Purse', as respective heads of the Privy Purse Office and the Treasurer's Office. Towards the end of George V's reign, the office of Keeper of the Privy Purse was briefly combined with that of Private Secretary to the King, with the erstwhile Deputy Treasurer (Sir Ralph Endersby Harwood) serving as Financial Secretary to the King.

== List of Keepers of the Privy Purse ==
=== Henry VIII ===
- Henry Norris by 1526–?1536 (executed 1536)
- Anthony Denny c. 1536

=== Edward VI ===
- Peter Osborne 1551–1552

=== Elizabeth I ===
- John Tamworth, 1559–1569
- Henry Seckford 1559–1603

=== James I ===
- Sir Richard Molyneux, 1st Baronet, 1607–?
- George Home, 1st Earl of Dunbar, c. 1610–1611
- John Murray, 1st Earl of Annandale 1611–1616

=== Charles I ===
- Richard Molyneux, 1st Viscount Molyneux, 1616?–1636
- Robert Carr, 1st Earl of Ancram, 1636?–1639

=== Charles II ===
- Henry Bennet, 1st Earl of Arlington, 1661–1662
- Charles Berkeley, 1st Earl of Falmouth, 1662–1665
- Baptist May 1665–1685

=== James II ===
- James Graham, 1685–1689

=== William III ===
- William Bentinck, 1st Earl of Portland, 1689–1700
- Caspar Frederick Henning, 1700–1702

=== Anne ===
- Sarah Churchill, Duchess of Marlborough 1702–1711
- Abigail Masham, Baroness Masham 1711–1714

=== George I ===
- Caspar Frederick Henning, 1714–1727

=== George II ===
- Augustus Schutz, 1727–1757
- The Honourable Edward Finch, 1757–1760

=== George III ===
- John Stuart, 3rd Earl of Bute, 1760–1763
- William Breton, 1763–1773
- James Brudenell, 5th Earl of Cardigan, 1773–1811
- Colonel Sir John McMahon, 1st Baronet, 1812–1817
- Lieutenant-General Benjamin Bloomfield, 1st Baron Bloomfield, 1817–1822

=== George IV ===
- Sir William Knighton, 1st Baronet, 1821–1830

=== William IV ===
- Major-General Sir Henry Wheatley, 1st Baronet, 1830–1846

=== Victoria ===
- George Edward Anson 1847–1849
- Colonel Sir Charles Beaumont Phipps, 1849–1866
- General Sir Charles Grey, 1866–1867 (jointly)
- Colonel Thomas Myddleton-Biddulph, 1866–1878 (jointly to 1867)
- Major-General Sir Henry Ponsonby, 1878–1895
- Lieutenant-Colonel Sir Fleetwood Edwards, 1895–1901

=== Edward VII ===
- General Sir Dighton MacNaghton Probyn, 1901–1910

=== George V ===
- Lieutenant-Colonel Sir William Carington, 1910–1914
- Lieutenant-Colonel Frederick Ponsonby, 1st Baron Sysonby, 1914–1935
- Colonel Clive Wigram, 1st Baron Wigram, 1935–1936

=== Edward VIII ===
- Major Sir Ulick Alexander, 1936

=== George VI ===
- Major Sir Ulick Alexander, 1936–1952

=== Elizabeth II ===
- Brigadier Charles Tryon, 2nd Baron Tryon, 1952–1971
- Major Sir Rennie Maudslay, 1971–1981
- Sir Peter Miles, 1981–1987
- Major Sir Shane Blewitt, 1988–1996
- Sir Michael Peat, 1996–2002
- Sir Alan Reid, 2002–2017
- Sir Michael Stevens 2018–2022

=== Charles III ===
- Sir Michael Stevens, 2022–2025
- James Chalmers, 2025–present

== Deputies ==
=== Deputy Keepers ===
This list is not complete.

- 1922–1925: Paymaster Rear-Admiral Sir John Henry George Chapple
- 1985–1988: Major Sir Shane Blewitt
- 1988–2002: Sir John Christopher Parsons
- 2002–?: Harold Smith
- ?–2011: Ian Donald McGregor
- 2011–2017: Sir Michael John Stevens
- 2017–present: Sally O'Neill

=== Deputy Treasurers ===
- 1923–1935: Sir Ralph Endersby Harwood
- 1941–1958: Commander Sir Dudley Colles
- 1958–1968: Commander Sir Philip John Row
- 1969–1985: Sir Russell Dillon Wood
- 1988–2002: Sir John Christopher Parsons
- 2003–2007: Stephen Ingleby Cawley
- 2007–2017: Sir Michael John Stevens
- 2017–present: Sally O'Neill

== See also ==
- Treasurer of the Household
