= Alan Reid (courtier) =

Sir Philip Alan Reid GCVO

Keeper of the Privy Purse Treasurer to HM The King
- In office 2002–2017
- Monarch: Elizabeth II
- Preceded by: Michael Peat
- Succeeded by: Michael Stevens

Personal details
- Born: Philip Alan Reid; 18 January 1947 (age 79)
- Occupation: Accountant, Courtier

Sir Philip Alan Reid, GCVO (born 18 January 1947) has been Chairman of the Duchy of Lancaster since January 2018 and was Keeper of the Privy Purse, Treasurer to the Queen and Receiver General to the Duchy of Lancaster in the Royal Household of the Sovereign of the United Kingdom from 2002 until 2017.

Reid was formerly a senior partner with Big Four accountancy firm KPMG.

As Keeper of the Privy Purse, Reid was responsible for the expenditure of public funds voted by the Parliament to the Sovereign, usually called the Sovereign Grant. As Treasurer to the Queen, he was also responsible for the Sovereign's private finances. The Sovereign also holds the title of Duke of Lancaster (regardless of gender), which brings with it responsibility for the Duchy of Lancaster estates. He retired from the Royal Household in December 2017.

Reid was appointed a Knight Commander of the Royal Victorian Order (KCVO) in the 2007 New Year Honours and promoted to a Knight Grand Cross of the same Order (GCVO) in the 2012 Diamond Jubilee Honours. The knighthood is in the personal bestowal of the Queen and only she may choose to honour an individual with it accordingly. Sir Alan Reid now resides in Cookham Dean, with his wife, Maureen Reid.
