= Tongkangla =

Tongkangla སྟོང་བཀང་ལ
- Village
- Location in Bhutan
- Coordinates: 27°11′N 91°17.5′E
- Country: Bhutan
- District: Mongar District
- Village block: Kengkhar Gewog
- Time zone: UTC+6 (BTT)

Tongkangla is a village in Mongar District in southeastern-central Bhutan.
