= Kanga Loaders =

Australian brand of compact utility loaders

- Type: Privately-owned by Digga Machinery Attachments
- Industry: Construction machinery
- Founded: Burleigh Heads, Queensland, Australia (1980)
- Founder: Alan Porter, David McIlwraith
- Headquarters: Yatala, Queensland, Australia
- Products: Mini Loader, Mini Digger, Mini Skid Steer, Mini Loader Attachments, Dingo Digger
- Website: www.kangaloader.com

Kanga Loaders is an Australian brand of compact utility loaders. The company's headquarters are in Yatala, Queensland with ten branches Australia-wide. Originally owned by the Jaden Group of companies and called the Dingo, Kanga Loaders is owned by Digga Australia with six series of stand-on Mini Skid Steer Loaders and assorted attachments.

== History ==
1980s
The Kanga Loader was originally developed by John Alan Porter and Doug McIlwraith in 1980 as a simple motorized wheelbarrow and it was not until 1981 that the 11 hp (8.2 kW) gas engine model painted red and white was released to the public. Two of the loaders manufactured in this period were still working in a privately owned rental yard and another in a North West Queensland opal mine.

In 1985 there was a partnership breakup one of them bought the manufacturing rights and started manufacturing the machines under the name of Dingo (not to be confused with Dingo Australia that manufacturers Dingo Mini Diggers in Queensland) with the yellow and black painted "Dingo 1000" after the remaining partners had declined to do so. Porter and McIlwraith re-branded the company as Jaden Loaders. In 1988 the name was changed again to what it is today the "Kanga" loader. This was followed a year later, after extensive product development, by being awarded an "Australian Design Award".

1990s
In 1997 the Kanga Loader was introduced into the United States painted green and gold, this was when the standard colour scheme emerged from the previously black and yellow loader.

Early 2000s
In 2000 a new model was released called the "Kanga Kid". This was followed in 2005 by the release of the MAXI 8 Series at the National Construction Exhibition in 2005. The Maxi 8 Series was a model available at the same time as the Kanga Kid and 5,6,7 Series. At this time they also had a Remote Control Loader named the D800R which was able to be used in a 200-metre radio range.

Late 2000s
2006 saw a new development in the 5,6,7 Series of the Kanga Loader being redesigned and engineered to adhere to government guidelines for Workplace Health and Safety. This was followed in 2008 by a new model of the Kanga Kid being released, and the first mention of the loaders being available in both Track and Wheel. Early 2009 saw the announcement that the assets and brand KANGA had been acquired by Digga Machinery Attachments.

Late 2010s
Although still referred to as Kanga Loaders, the business name changed to Kanga Loaders Global in order to strengthen their focus on the export market after feeling the effects of the GFC. Also in 2013, Kanga Loaders moved into its own manufacturing facility in Yatala, QLD.

2020

Kanga Loaders has expanded their business to the United States, with a product launch at the American Rental Association Show in February 2020 in Orlando, Florida. The Kanga Loaders USA facility is located in Dyersville, Iowa.

== Current range of Kanga Miniloaders ==
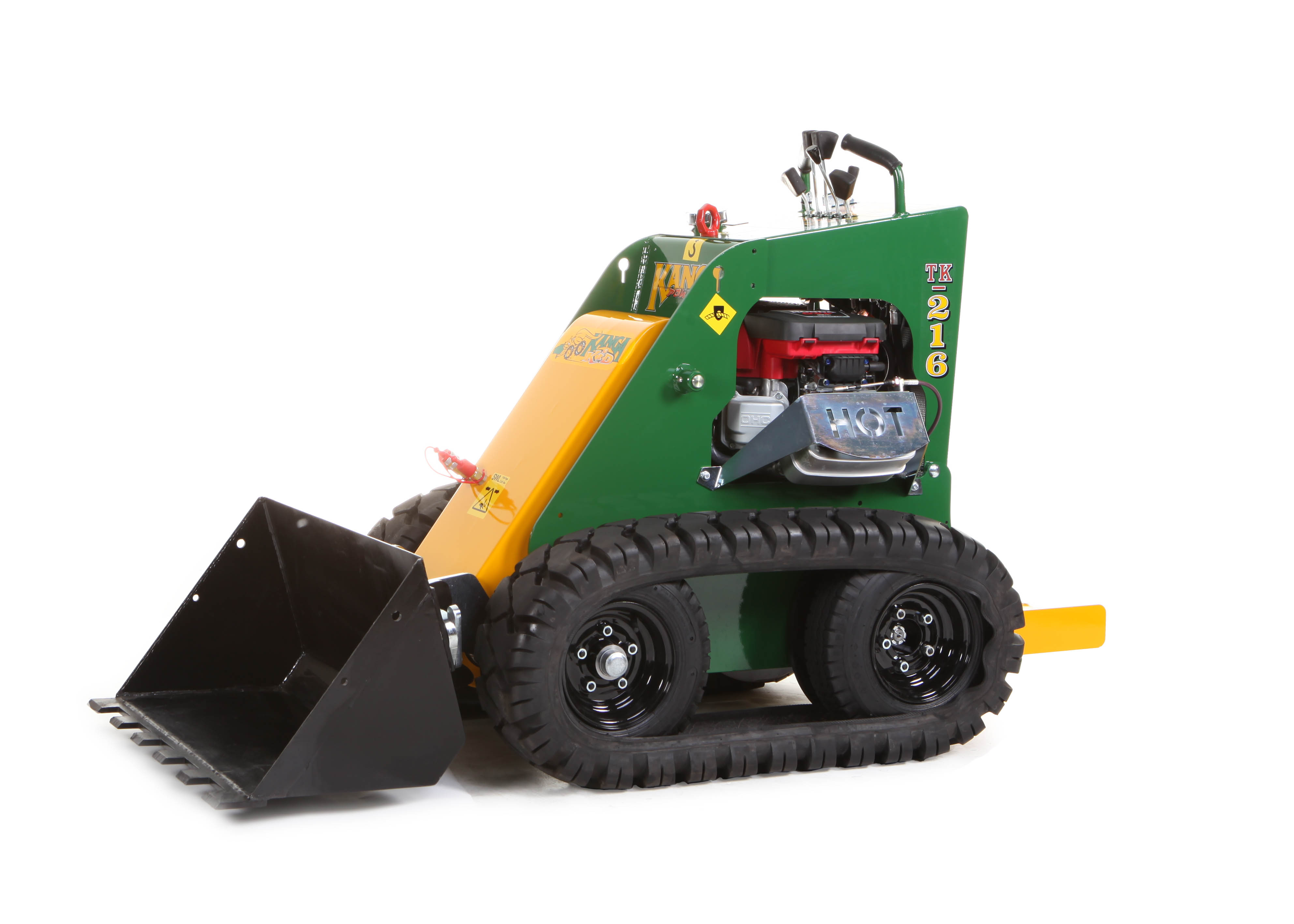
Kanga 2 Series Mini Kid Loader

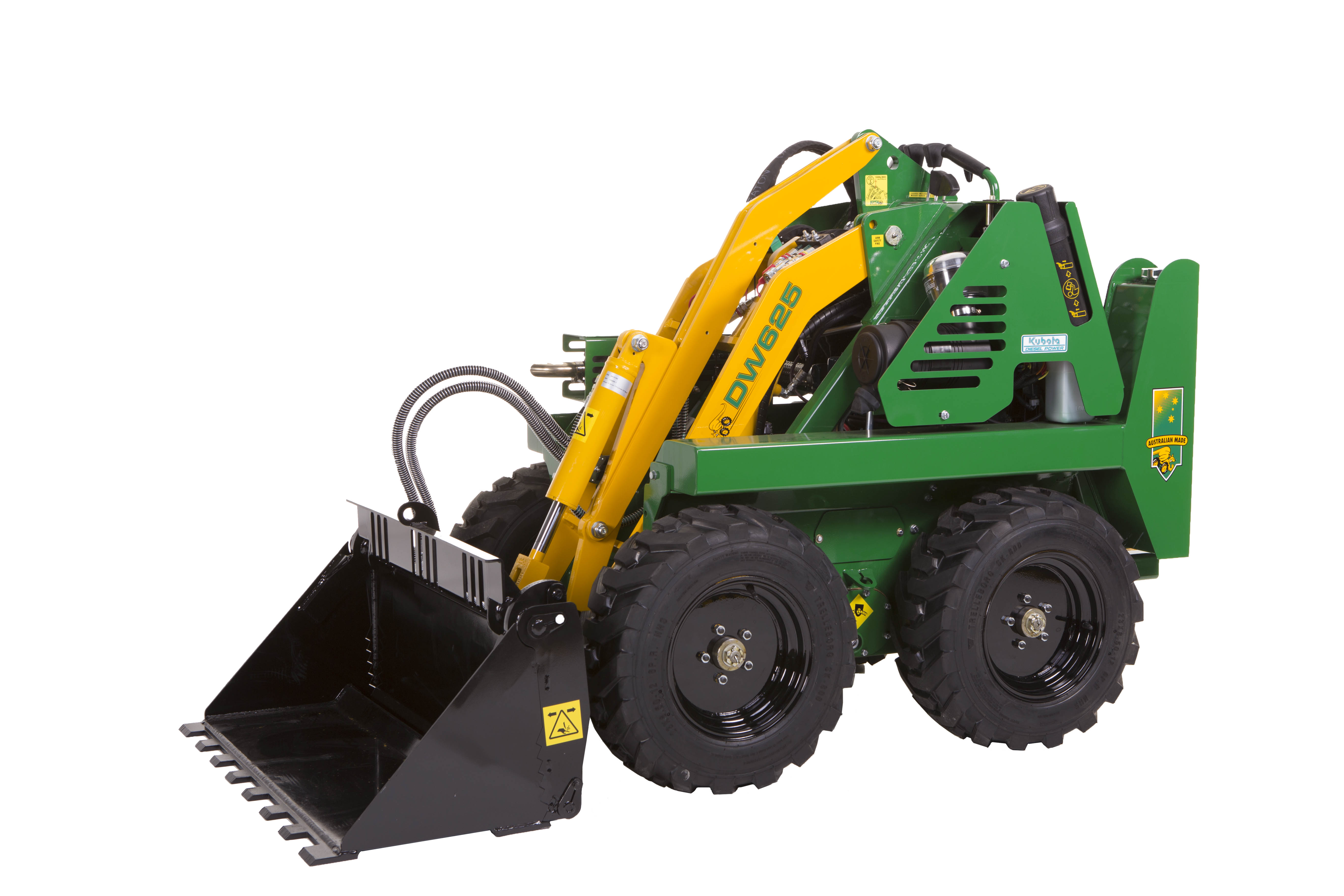
Kanga Loaders 6 Series Mini Loader

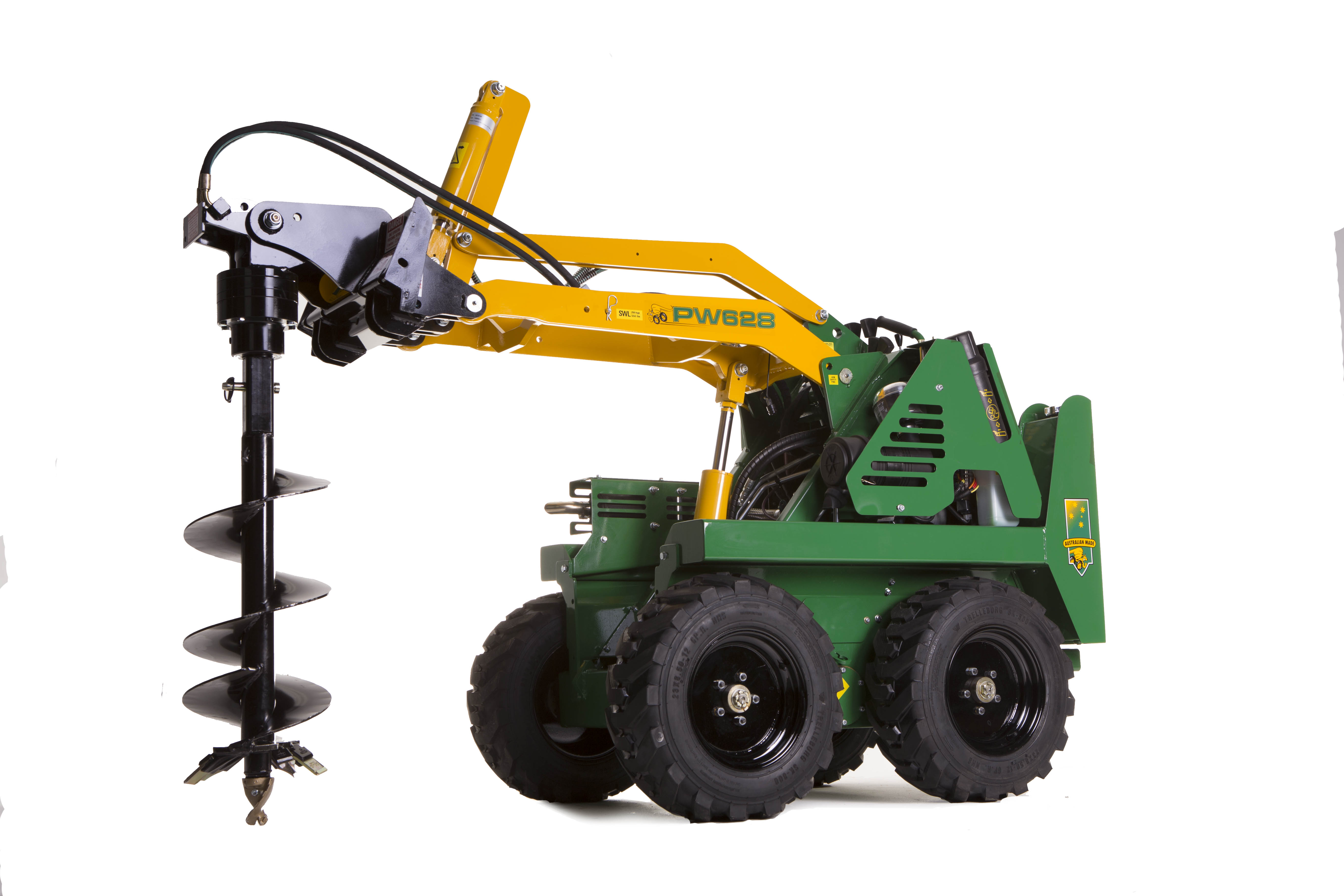
6 Series Diesel Kanga Mini Loader with Power Head and Auger

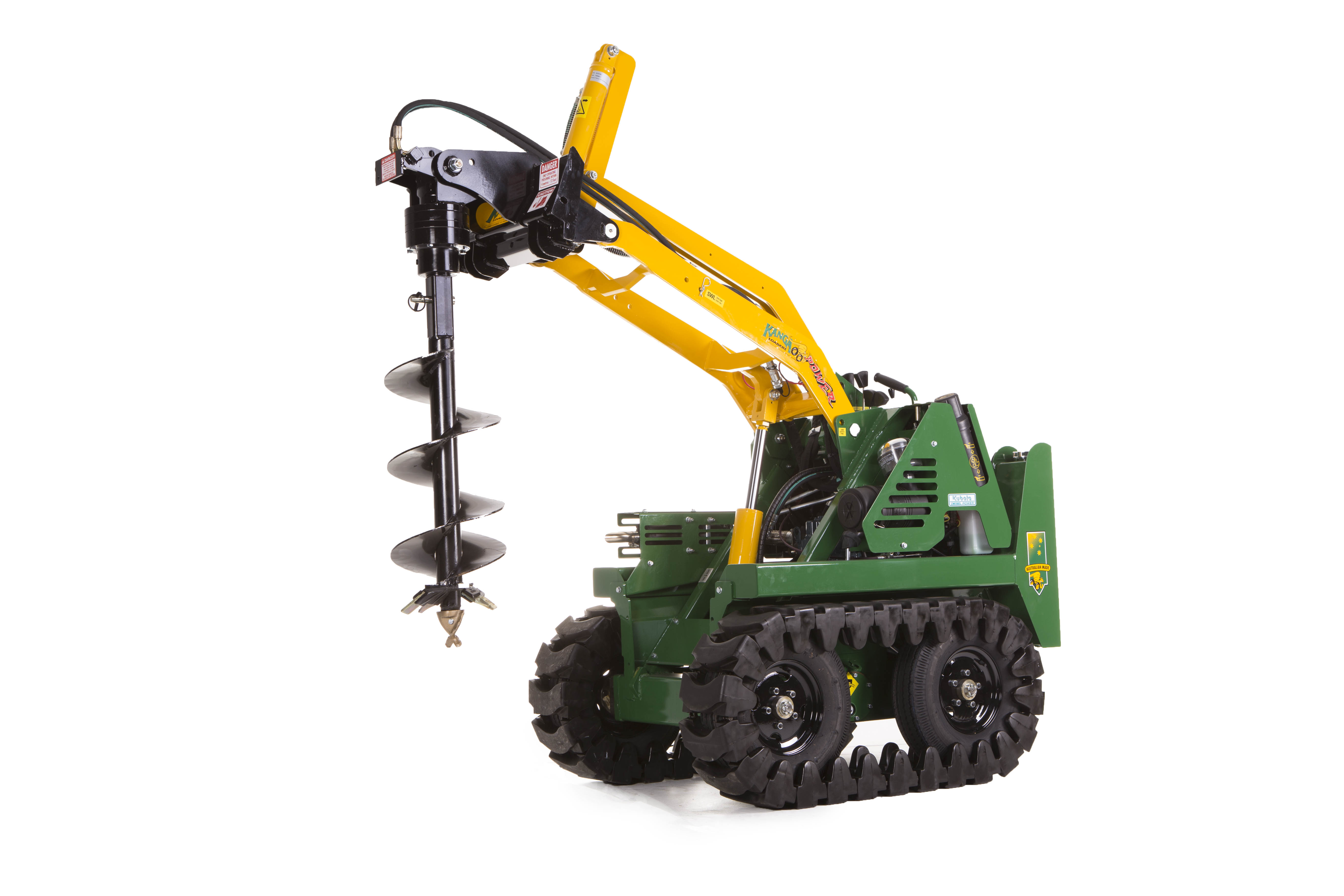
Kanga 7 Series Track Mini Loader

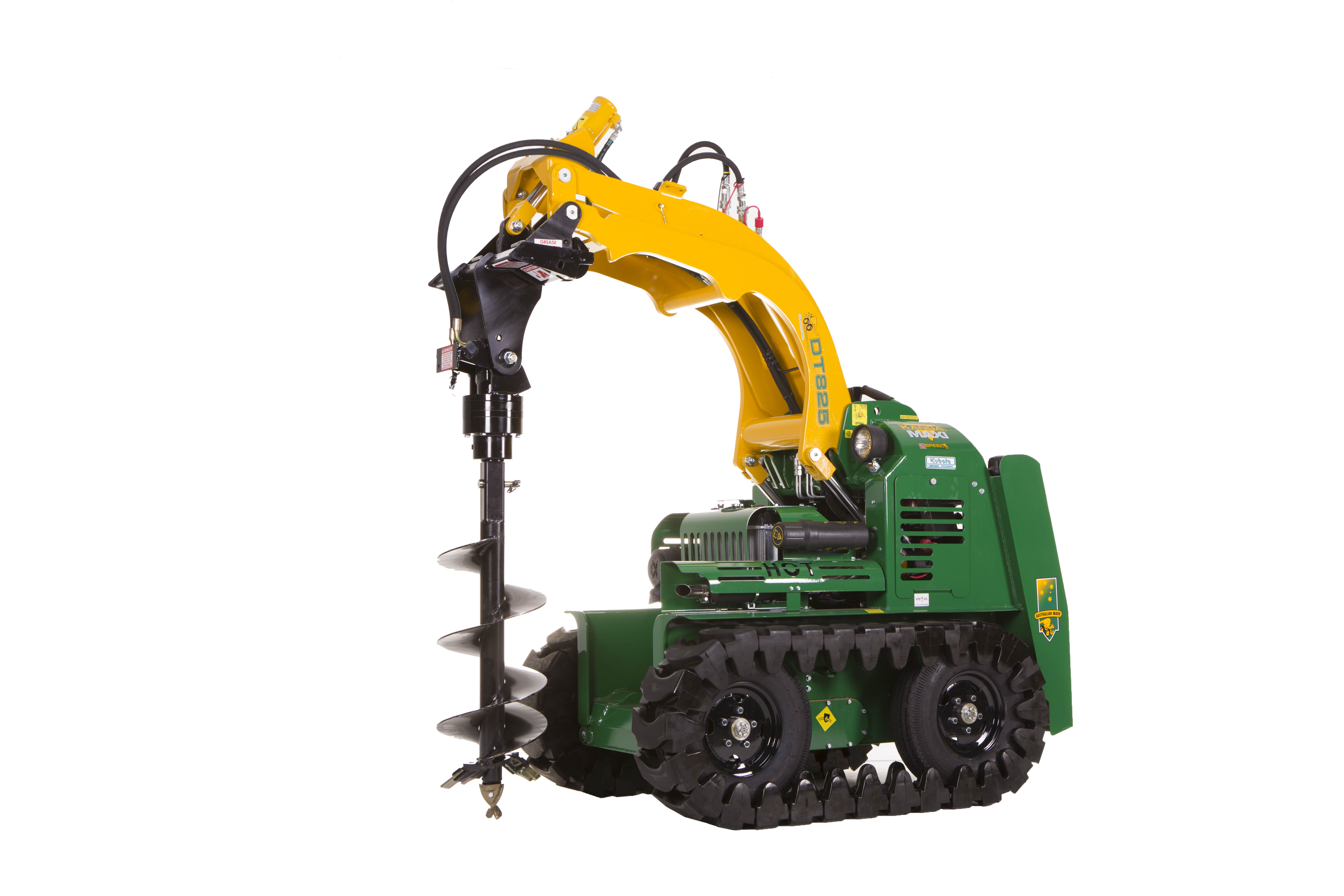
Kanga 8 Series with Power Head and Auger

== Awards ==
- 1989 - Winner of Australian Design Award
- 2004 - Winner Premier Queensland Export Awards - Small to Medium Manufacturer
- 2004 - Finalist Australian Export Award
- 2007 - Highly Commended, Innovative Product of the Year; Manufacturing - Endeavour Award, Manufacturers Monthly
- 2014 - Gold Coast Mayors Innovation Award
