= Charles Tryon, 2nd Baron Tryon =

British peer, army officer and member of the Royal Household

Brigadier The Right Honourable The Lord Tryon GCVO, KCB, DSO, DL

Keeper of the Privy Purse Treasurer to HM The Queen
- In office 1952–1971
- Monarch: Elizabeth II
- Preceded by: Sir Ulick Alexander
- Succeeded by: Sir Rennie Maudsley

Personal details
- Born: 24 May 1906
- Died: 9 November 1976 (aged 70)
- Spouse: Etheldreda Josephine Burrell
- Parent(s): George, 1st Baron Tryon; Averil Vivian
- Education: Royal Military College, Sandhurst

Military service
- Allegiance: United Kingdom
- Branch/service: British Army
- Years of service: 1926–1949
- Rank: Brigadier
- Unit: Grenadier Guards
- Battles/wars: Second World War
- Awards: Distinguished Service Order; Mentioned in dispatches

Brigadier Charles George Vivian Tryon, 2nd Baron Tryon, GCVO, KCB, DSO, DL (24 May 1906 – 9 November 1976) was a British peer, British Army officer, and a member of the Royal Household.

== Early life and military career ==
Elder son of George, 1st Baron Tryon, on 3 August 1939, he married Etheldreda Josephine Burrell (1909–2002), known as Dreda; she was a daughter of Sir Merrik Burrell, Bt, CBE (1877–1957).

Tryon graduated from the Royal Military College, Sandhurst and was commissioned as a second lieutenant in the Grenadier Guards in 1926.

Tryon succeeded to his father's title in 1940. The family seat was the Manor House at Great Durnford, Wiltshire; Dreda ran a boarding preparatory school there from 1942 until 1992.

Promoted to major in 1943, by the end of the Second World War he was a war substantive lieutenant colonel, with permanent promotion in 1948. He retired in 1949 and was granted the honorary rank of brigadier.

== Career in the Royal Household ==
Lord Tryon began his career in the Royal Household as the Assistant Keeper of the Privy Purse to King George VI in 1949. Still the Assistant Keeper of the Privy Purse upon the ascension of Queen Elizabeth II, Lord Tryon was appointed Keeper of the Privy Purse and Treasurer to the Queen on 16 October 1952. Lord Tryon served as Keeper of the Privy Purse and Treasurer to the Queen until 1 November 1971, being appointed a Permanent Lord-in-Waiting upon his retirement. In 1968, as the Queen's chief financial manager, he sought to secure an exemption from proposed amendments to the Race Relations Act. He stated that it was policy to allow people of colour only to work as domestic servants at the Palace.

== Later life and death ==
In 1972, Lord Tryon was appointed a deputy lieutenant in the County of Wilts. Lord Tryon died in 1976, aged 70, and was succeeded by his only son, Anthony Tryon.

== Honours ==
During his military career Lord Tryon was Mentioned in dispatches, later being awarded the Distinguished Service Order. Lord Tryon was appointed a Knight Commander of the Royal Victorian Order in 1953, and promoted to Knight Grand Cross in 1968. Appointed a Knight Commander in the Civil Division of the Order of the Bath in 1962, he was also an Officer of the Order of St John.

== Arms ==
Coat of arms of Charles Tryon, 2nd Baron Tryon
Crest Issuant from a coronet composed of four roses set upon a rim Or a bear's head Sable charged with seven stars in the form of the Constellation Ursa Major Gold Escutcheon Azure a fess embattled between in chief three estoiles and in base a portcullis chained Or. Supporters Dexter an army pensioner in hospital uniform sinister a postman holding with the exterior hand a letter sack over his shoulder Proper. Motto Do Right And Fear Not

Court offices
Preceded by Sir Ulick Alexander	Keeper of the Privy Purse; 1952–1971	Succeeded by Sir Rennie Maudslay
Preceded by Sir Ulick Alexander	Treasurer to the Queen; 1952–1971	Succeeded by Sir Rennie Maudslay
Peerage of the United Kingdom
Preceded by George Tryon	Baron Tryon; 1940–1976	Succeeded by Anthony Tryon
