= Kangas =

Kangas is a Finnish surname. Notable people with the surname include:

- Arttu Kangas (born 1993), Finnish athlete
- Jeanne Kangas (1940–2023), American lawyer and politician
- Jenni Kangas (born 1992), Finnish track and field athlete
- Joona Kangas (born 1997), Finnish freestyle skier
- Juhani Kangas (born 1998), Finnish professional footballer
- Karl Kangas (1886–1966), Finnish wrestler
- Kevin Kangas, American film maker
- Orvokki Kangas (1921–2000), Finnish politician
- Paul Kangas (1937–2017), American journalist
- Steve Kangas (1961–1999), American journalist
