= Rennie Maudslay =

British Army officer and courtier (1915–1988)

Major Sir James Rennie Maudslay, GCVO, KCB, MBE (13 August 1915 – 8 June 1988) was a British Army officer and courtier in the Household of Queen Elizabeth II.

== Biography ==
Maudslay served in the Second World War as an officer in the King's Royal Rifle Corps, and was made a Member of the Order of the British Empire on 20 September 1945 for his wartime services. He relinquished his commission in the army on 13 August 1965. Between 1971 and 1981 he worked as Keeper of the Privy Purse, the financial manager of the Royal Household. He was also Secretary of the Royal Victorian Order from 1971 to 1987. On 1 January 1973 Maudslay was appointed an Extra Equerry to Elizabeth II. He was made a Knight Commander of the Order of the Bath in the 1979 New Year Honours.

In a letter from Prince Philip, Duke of Edinburgh to Maudslay in 1970, the Prince described him as a "silly little Whitehall twit".

Between 1970 and 1979 he lived at Frensham Vale House, near Farnham, Surrey.

Court offices
Preceded by Lord Tryon	Keeper of the Privy Purse; 1971–1981	Succeeded by Sir Peter Miles
Preceded by Lord Tryon	Treasurer to the Queen; 1971–1981	Succeeded by Sir Peter Miles
