= Michael Stevens (accountant) =

British accountant and courtier (born 1958)

Sir Michael Stevens GCVO

Keeper of the Privy Purse Treasurer to HM The King
- In office 2018–2025
- Monarchs: Elizabeth II; Charles III
- Preceded by: Sir Alan Reid
- Succeeded by: James Chalmers

Personal details
- Born: Michael John Stevens; 1 May 1958 (age 68)
- Education: University of Birmingham
- Occupation: Accountant, Courtier

Sir Michael John Stevens, GCVO (born 1 May 1958) is a British accountant and courtier.

Stevens was born in Southampton in 1958 and attended the University of Birmingham.

He worked for the accountants KPMG from 1979 to 1995, when he joined the Royal Collection Trust as Finance Director; in 2002, he became its Managing Director. In 2007, he was appointed Deputy Treasurer to the Queen, and from 2011, he held this office jointly with the Deputy Keeper of the Privy Purse. In 2018, he was promoted to Keeper of the Privy Purse, Treasurer to the Queen and Receiver-General of the Duchy of Lancaster, succeeding Sir Alan Reid. In this role, he took part in the 2023 Coronation.

For his services to the Royal Household and the monarch, Stevens was appointed a Lieutenant of the Royal Victorian Order (LVO) by Queen Elizabeth II in the 2002 New Year Honours. He was promoted by the Queen to Commander of the same order (CVO) in the 2009 New Year Honours, and to Knight Commander (KCVO) in the 2017 New Year Honours. Upon his resignation as Keeper of the Privy Purse and Treasurer in June 2025, he was promoted again to Knight Grand Cross of the Royal Victorian Order (GCVO) by King Charles III on 3 June 2025.
