= Shane Blewitt =

British military officer and royal courtier (1935–2022)

Major Sir Shane Gabriel Basil Blewitt GCVO (25 March 1935 – 15 May 2022) was a British courtier and military officer. He served in the Irish Guards from 1956 to 1974 in the British Army of the Rhine, West Germany, Northern Ireland, Aden, and Hong Kong, attaining the rank of Major.

== Personal life ==
He was the son of Colonel Basil Blewitt. Blewitt and wife Monica Julia, formerly Morrogh Bernard, daughter of Major Robert Henry Calvert and wife Monica (née Buxton), wed on 16 June 1969. Major Blewitt had two stepchildren by his wife's first marriage, plus two biological children by Julia. They also had 10 grandchildren He died on 15 May 2022, at the age of 87.

== Royal offices ==
- Assistant Keeper of the Privy Purse and Treasurer to HM The Queen (1975–1985)
- Deputy Keeper of the Privy Purse and Treasurer to HM The Queen (1985–1987)
- Keeper of the Privy Purse and Treasurer to HM The Queen (1988–1996)
- Extra Equerry to HM The Queen (1996–?)

== Affiliations ==
- Member, King's Fund General Council (1989–2010)
- Council, King Edward VII Hospital (1989–2010)

== RVO ==
He was first appointed LVO in 1981, and as follows:

- CVO (1987)
- KCVO (1989)
- GCVO (1996)

Court offices
Preceded by Sir Peter Miles	Keeper of the Privy Purse; 1987–1996	Succeeded by Sir Michael Peat
Preceded by Sir Peter Miles	Treasurer to the Queen; 1987–1996	Succeeded by Sir Michael Peat
