= 5th Horse (Probyn's Horse) =

5 Probyn's Horse
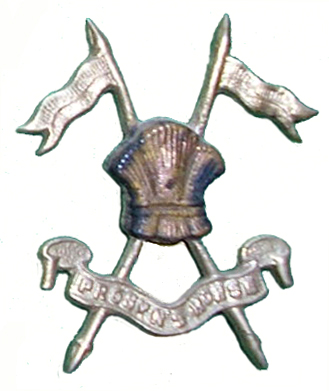
- Active: 1857–present
- Country: British India; Pakistan
- Branch: British Indian Army; Pakistan Army
- Type: Armoured Regiment
- Size: Regiment
- Nickname: Probyn's Horse
- Motto: Allah O Akbar
- Engagements: Indian Rebellion of 1857; Second Opium War 1860-61; Abyssinian Campaign 1868; Second Afghan War 1878-80; First World War 1914-18 (Mesopotamia); Second World War 1939-45 (Burma); Indo-Pakistani War of 1965

Commanders
- Colonels-in-Chief: King Edward VII; King George V
- Colonel of the Regiment: Field Marshal The Lord Birdwood
- Notable commanders: General Sir Dighton Probyn, VC; General Sir Hugh Gough, VC; General Sir Alan Hartley; Lieutenant General Gul Hassan

The 5th Horse is an armoured regiment of the Pakistan Army. It was previously known as the 5th King Edward's Own Lancers Probyn's Horse, which was a regular cavalry regiment of the British Indian Army. It was formed in 1921 by the amalgamation of the 11th King Edward's Own Lancers (Probyn's Horse) and the 12th Cavalry.

== 11th King Edward's Own Lancers (Probyn's Horse) ==
The regiment known as 11th King Edward's Own Lancers (Probyn's Horse) was originally raised on 1 August 1857 by Captain Frederick Wale as Wale's Horse during the Indian Rebellion of 1857 and served at Lucknow. Captain Wale was killed in action on 1 March 1858, while leading the regiment in the pursuit of rebels, and was replaced by Major Dighton Probyn, VC. In 1860 the regiment was dispatched to China to take part in the Second Opium War. It participated in the advance on Peking and returned to India in 1861 with a good reputation. The regiment saw service in the Second Afghan War of 1878-80 and then took part in the Black Mountain Expedition; it went to Chitral and formed part of the Malakand Field Force. During the First World War, the regiment served in Mesopotamia.

- 1857 Wale's Horse
- 1857 1st Sikh Irregular Cavalry
- 1858 1st Sikh Irregular Cavalry (Probyn's Horse)
- 1861 11th Regiment of Bengal Cavalry
- 1864 11th Regiment of Bengal Cavalry (Lancers)
- 1874 11th Regiment of Bengal Lancers
- 1876 11th (Prince of Wales's Own) Regiment of Bengal Lancers
- 1901 11th (Prince of Wales's Own) Bengal Lancers
- 1903 11th Prince of Wales's Own Lancers
- 1904 11th Prince of Wales's Own Lancers (Probyn's Horse)
- 1906 11th King Edward's Own Lancers (Probyn's Horse)

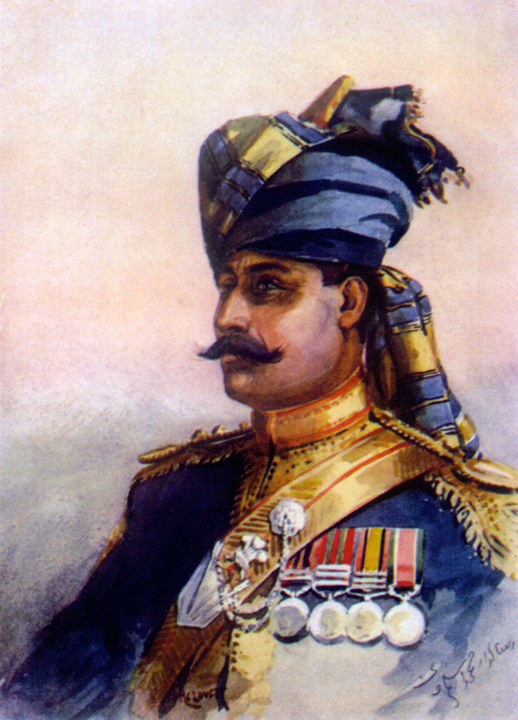
Risaldar-Major, 11th King Edward's Own Lancers (Probyn's Horse). Watercolour by AC Lovett, 1910

== Uniform ==
The Lancer's uniform of Probyn's Horse was topped by cap-line worn unattached. Shoulder epaulettes were covered with gilt curb-chains, and plus the Mameluke scimitar.

Mussullmen were unique in wearing a kulla, a pointed cap under the puggaree. Made of heavy khaki cloth it gave good protection against the sun, and became popular, even with British officers, who's adopted the puggaree as part of their dress.

== 12th Cavalry ==
The 12th Cavalry was also raised during the Indian Rebellion of 1857, by Captain PR Hockin in October 1857. It formed part of the 1868 Expedition to Abyssinia (Ethiopia) and served in the Second Afghan War of 1878-80. During the First World War, the regiment fought in the Mesopotamian Campaign.

- 1857 2nd Sikh Irregular Cavalry
- 1861 12th Regiment of Bengal Cavalry
- 1901 12th Bengal Cavalry
- 1903 12th Cavalry

== Probyn's Horse (5th King Edward VII's Own Lancers) ==
After the First World War, the number of Indian cavalry regiments was reduced from thirty-nine to twenty-one. However, instead of disbanding the surplus units, it was decided to amalgamate them in pairs. This resulted in renumbering and renaming the entire cavalry line. The 11th King Edward's Own Lancers (Probyn's Horse) and the 12th Cavalry were amalgamated at Meerut on 28 August 1921 to form 5th King Edward's Own Probyn's Horse. The uniform of Probyn's Horse was blue with scarlet facings. The new regiment's badge consisted of the Prince of Wales's plumes. Its class composition was one squadron each of Punjabi Muslims, Sikhs and Dogras.

== Mechanisation ==
The regiment was converted to a mechanised unit in 1940 while based at Risalpur. Initially this simply involved the substitution of trucks for horses but by mid-1942 re-equipment with three squadrons of Stuart tanks and Lee tanks had been concluded. In 1944 Probyn's was assigned to 225 Indian Tank Brigade, to serve with distinction in the Burma Campaign using M4 Sherman tanks.

== Independence ==
On the Partition of India in 1947, Probyn's Horse was allotted to Pakistan. In 1956, Pakistan became a republic and all titles pertaining to British royalty were dropped. The regiment's new designation was 5 Horse, although informally, it continues to be known as the Probyn's Horse. During the Indo-Pakistani War of 1965, 5 Horse fought in the Battle of Khem Karan.

- 1921 11th/12th Probyn's Horse (amalgamation)
- 1922 5th King Edward's Own Probyn's Horse
- 1927 Probyn's Horse (5th King Edward's Own Lancers)
- 1937 Probyn's Horse (5th King Edward VII's Own Lancers)
- 1956 5 Horse

== Battle honours ==
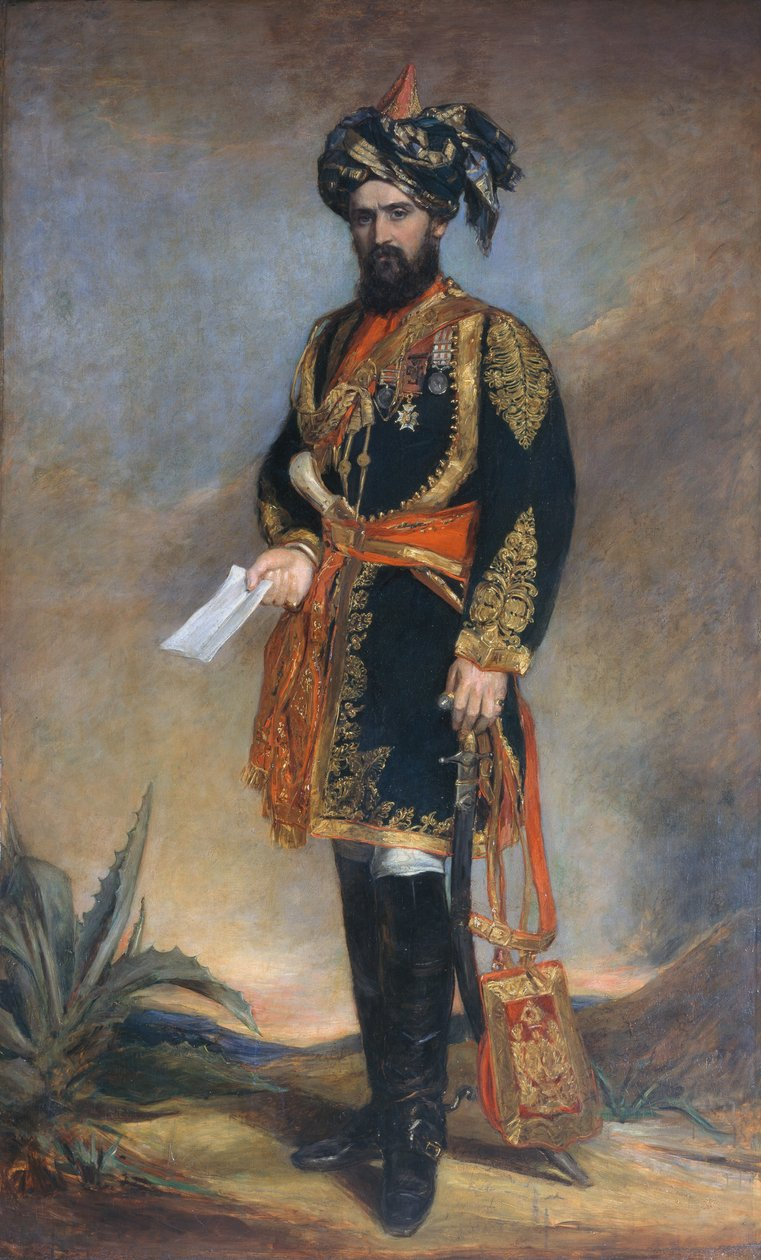
Major Dighton Probyn, VC, 1867

Lucknow, Taku Forts, Pekin 1860, Abyssinia, Ali Masjid, Peiwar Kotal, Charasiah, Kabul 1879, Afghanistan 1878–80, Chitral, Malakand, Punjab Frontier, Mesopotamia 1915-18, Meiktila, Capture of Meiktila, Defence of Meiktila, Taungtha, Rangoon Road, Pyawbwe, Pyinmana, Toungoo, Pegu 1945, Burma 1942–45, Khem Karan 1965, Sialkot 1971
