= Tractor PTO auger =

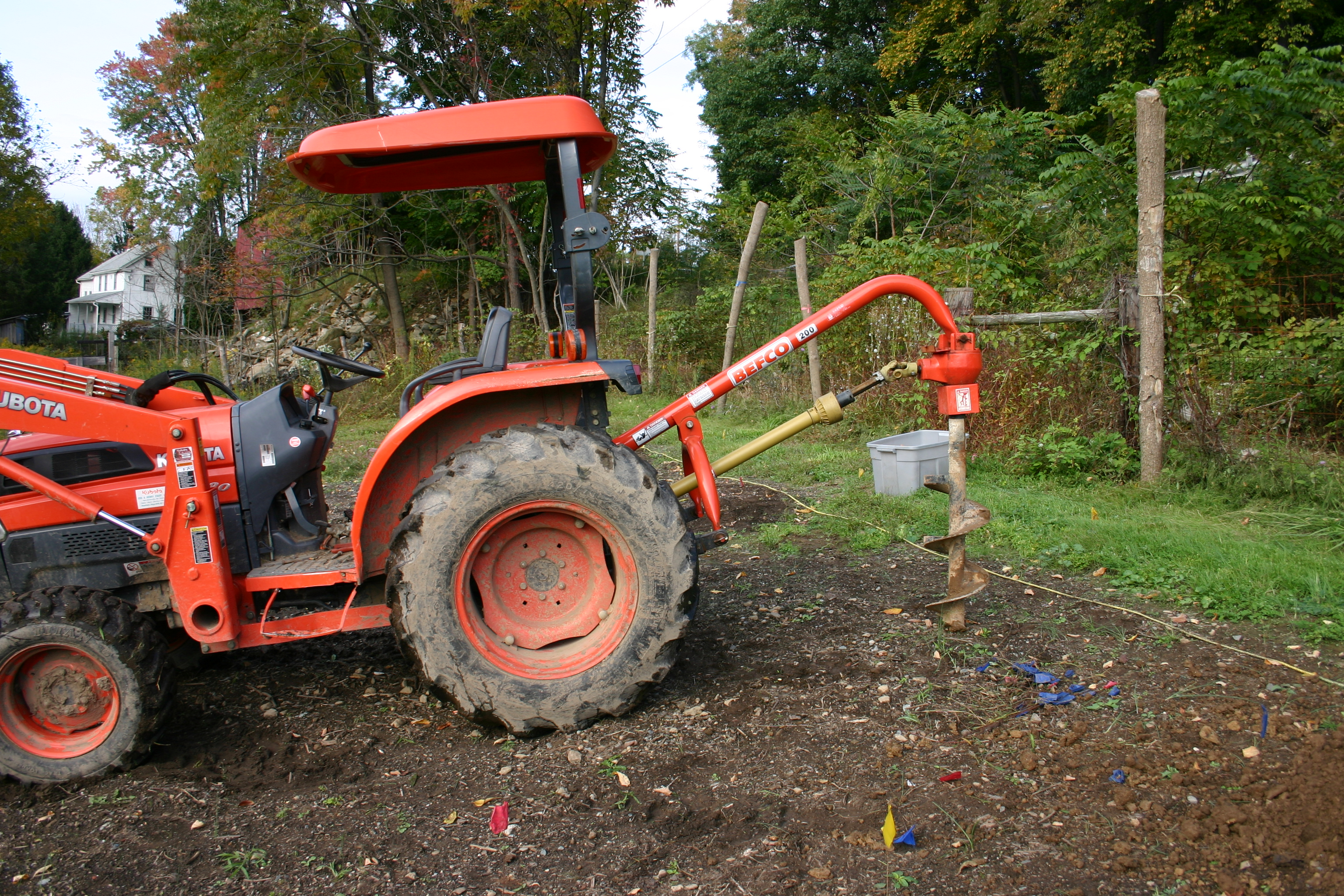
A tractor fitted with a post hole digger

Tractor PTO Augers, commonly referred to as Post Hole Diggers and Earth Augers, are implements used in conjunction with a tractor's Power Take Off drive, and a tractor's 3 point hitch.

The basic concept of a tractor PTO auger is to harness the tractor's available energy by attaching a PTO shaft to a tractor's PTO drive in order to drill a hole of predetermined size (size of the auger shaft and diameter) and depth into the ground. This in turn will provide power to the Tractor PTO Auger's gearbox. Most modern Tractor PTO Auger gearboxes come standard with a shear bolt to protect the gear drive if the auger encounters an obstruction such as rock during drilling a hole.

Tractor PTO Augers connect via 3 point hitch to subcompact tractors and mid-size tractors.
