= Ulick Alexander =

British Army officer, businessman, courtier (1889–1973)

The Right Honourable Sir Ulick Alexander GCB GCVO CMG OBE
- Sir Ulick in May 1949

Keeper of the Privy Purse; Treasurer to the King
- In office 1936–1952
- Monarch: George VI
- Preceded by: The Lord Wigram
- Succeeded by: The Lord Tryon

Personal details
- Born: James Ulick Francis Canning Alexander; 10 February 1889 Marylebone, London
- Died: 4 April 1973 (aged 84) London, England
- Spouse: Lady Mary Beatrice Thynne (m. 1947)
- Education: Royal Military College, Sandhurst

Sir James Ulick Francis Canning Alexander GCB GCVO CMG OBE (10 February 1889 – 4 April 1973) was a British Army officer, businessman, and courtier in several of the Royal Households of the United Kingdom. He was present in December 1936, when Edward VIII signed the Instrument of Abdication.

== Early life and education ==
Alexander was born at 18 Montague Street, Portman Square, in Marylebone, London, the eldest son of Capt. James Dalison Alexander of the Queen's Own West Kent Yeomanry and Lady Emily Boyle. His maternal grandparents were Richard Boyle, 9th Earl of Cork and Lady Emily Charlotte de Burgh (1828–1912), second daughter of Ulick de Burgh, 1st Marquess of Clanricarde. His paternal great-grandfather was the Irish-born banker James Alexander.

He was educated at Eton College, before attending the Royal Military College, Sandhurst.

== Career ==
In 1909, Alexander was commissioned into the Coldstream Guards. He first saw active service during the First World War, during which he was attached to the Egyptian Army and was mentioned in dispatches. Between 1920 and 1921, he was Military Secretary for the Egyptian Army. From 1923 to 1925 he served as Political Secretary to Alexander Cambridge, 1st Earl of Athlone while he was Governor-General of the Union of South Africa.

Between 1928 and 1936, Alexander was Comptroller of the Household to Prince George, Duke of Kent. In 1934, he was made a Companion of the Order of St Michael and St George. In 1936, Alexander held the office of Keeper of the Privy Purse and Extra Equerry to Edward VIII, and he retained the role during the reign of George VI from 1936 to 1952; among his duties was allocating 'grace and favour' apartments in the royal palaces.

Following the accession of Elizabeth II, Alexander became an Extra Equerry in her household and a Privy Councillor in 1952.

From 1952 to 1957, Sir Ulick was Chairman of Tanganyika Concessions, and served as its director from 1957 to 1963. From 1952 to 1964, he was director of the Benguela Railway Company, and from 1954 to 1963 he was director of the Union Minière du Haut Katanga. In 1957, he served as a director of the Banque Belge.

== Honours ==
In 1919, Alexander was appointed an Officer of the Order of the British Empire in recognition of his wartime service. In 1925, he was invested as a Member of the Royal Victorian Order (MVO) following the Prince of Wales' tour to Africa and South America. He was made a CVO in the 1932 Birthday Honours and a Commander of the Order of St Michael and St George in 1934.

In the 1937 Coronation Honours, he was knighted as KCVO, and he was made Knight Commander of the Order of the Bath in the 1947 Birthday Honours. He was furthered honoured as a GCVO in the 1948 Birthday Honours. In the 1953 New Year Honours, he was honoured as a GCB.

== Personal life ==
Alexander married Lady Mary Beatrice Thynne, her second husband, on 27 November 1947. She was youngest daughter of Thomas Thynne, 5th Marquess of Bath and Violet Caroline Mordaunt. She was married from 1927 to 1947 to Charles Wilson, 3rd Baron Nunburnholme (1904–1974). He died in 1973 in London, aged 84. Lady Mary Alexander died the following year, aged 71.

Court offices
| Preceded by Lord Wigram | Keeper of the Privy Purse; 1945 – 1952 | Succeeded by Lord Tryon |
| Preceded by Lord Wigram | Treasurer to the King; 1945 – 1952 | Succeeded by Lord Tryon |
