= Dale Tryon, Baroness Tryon =

British fashion maven and close friend of Prince Charles (1948–1997)

Dale Tryon
- Born: Dale Elizabeth Harper; 3 January 1948; Melbourne, Australia
- Died: 15 November 1997 (aged 49); King Edward VII's Hospital, London, United Kingdom
- Spouse: Anthony Tryon, 3rd Baron Tryon (m. 1973; div. 1997)
- Children: 4, including Zoë Tryon

Dale Elizabeth Tryon, Baroness Tryon (née Harper; 3 January 1948 – 15 November 1997) was a socialite and a businesswoman in the international fashion world. She created the fashion label "Kanga" and the couture line "The Dale Tryon Collection". "Kanga" also came to be her own nickname. Tryon gave her support to a number of charities including SANE, the mental health charity of which she was the chairwoman. She was a close friend of the Prince of Wales (later King Charles III).

== Early life ==
Born in Melbourne, Australia, she was the eldest of three children of a wealthy printing magnate, Barry Harper, and his wife, Jean Harper. In early childhood Dale was diagnosed with Perthes disease, which affects the hip joint, and which she had until the age of nine, spending time in a children's hospital in irons, from feet to chest. She had also received a diagnosis for spina bifida in childhood.

== Marriage ==
An active socialite described by family and friends as having "tremendous joie de vivre", within two weeks of arriving in England she had met Anthony Tryon (later 3rd Baron Tryon), who was a member of Prince Charles's inner circle. Dale and Anthony married in 1973 in the Chapel Royal at St James's Palace, and had four children: Zoë (born 1974), Charles (born 1976), and twins Edward and Victoria (born 1979).

After divorcing her husband, Dale was also out of the Prince's inner circle. According to Tina Brown's book The Palace Papers, Prince Charles released a statement in 1997 which declared that "they were no longer the friends they once were".

== Businesses ==
Tryon started her career in the late 1960s as a reporter for The Australian Women's Weekly. In 1969 she moved to the UK and worked in the London office of that magazine. In 1982 she briefly worked in the business of American-born Hong Kong designer Diane Fraise as a fashion agent. In 1983, Dale started a fashion business called Kanga, located in Beauchamp Place, Knightsbridge. Having persuaded Diana, Princess of Wales to wear a Kanga dress to the Live Aid concert, it became a successful international business. Dale lived in Lord Tryon's family home, the 18th-century Manor House at Great Durnford, near Salisbury. From the early 1980s her clothes were sold in shops in England, America, Australia, France and Spain, and her own boutique in Knightsbridge was later joined by branches in Salisbury, Hong Kong, and Dublin. Both "Kanga" and her couture line named "The Dale Tryon Collection" were successful.

== Health ==
Dale had Perthes disease as a child, spina bifida since childhood and was diagnosed with uterine cancer in 1993. After living with spina bifida for years, she had a series of surgeries to correct the issue. After this she travelled for a period with a nurse, a physiotherapist, and her daughter, Zoë, who would lie next to her as she slept, rolling her over regularly.

Soon after she received the 'all clear' from cancer, Tryon underwent treatment at Farm Place, an alcohol and drug rehabilitation clinic in Surrey. She was on a heavy dose of painkillers, and drank excessive quantities of vodka and champagne. While undergoing treatment for addiction at the clinic, she fell from a third-floor window, fractured her skull, broke her back and was paralysed.

Tryon was left a paraplegic from her fall, and for the last 18 months of her life was in a wheelchair.

== Divorce ==
Living with recurring depression, and after being told by her husband that he wanted a divorce, she was detained on 17 June 1997 under the Mental Health Act 1983 for 28 days, after leaving the Black Horse Inn in Great Durnford. After discharge from the spinal injuries unit at Salisbury District Hospital, she returned home. The decree nisi was announced on 1 September, after which she renounced her title and moved into The Ritz hotel, where she intended to throw a party for her 50th birthday.

== Death ==
Towards the end of her life, Tryon travelled to Australia to meet her mother and went to India to undergo homeopathic treatment by a doctor who was introduced to her by the Prince of Wales. On her return, she was admitted to the King Edward VII Hospital, Westminster, experiencing complications from severe bed sores for which she had plastic surgery. Tryon died there on 15 November 1997 from septicaemia, aged 49. She was buried four days later in England, and in her will left her £1.3 million estate to her children.
