= Dighton Probyn =

British general (1833–1924)

General The Right Honourable Sir Dighton Probyn VC, GCB, GCSI, GCVO, ISO
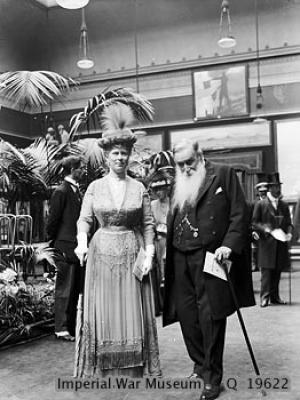
- General Sir Dighton Probyn with Queen Mary, July 1918
- Born: 21 January 1833; Marylebone, London
- Died: 20 June 1924 (aged 91); Sandringham House, Norfolk
- Burial place: Kensal Green Cemetery
- Spouse(s): Letitia Maria Thellusson, Lady Probyn (m. 1872-1900; her death)
- Military career
- Allegiance: United Kingdom
- Branch: Bengal Army; British Indian Army
- Service years: 1849–19??
- Rank: General
- Conflicts: Indian Mutiny; Second Anglo-Chinese War; Umbeyla Campaign
- Awards: Victoria Cross; Knight Grand Cross of the Order of the Bath; Knight Grand Commander of the Order of the Star of India; Knight Grand Cross of the Royal Victorian Order; Imperial Service Order; Order of Philip the Magnanimous (Hessen); Order of the Red Eagle (1st Class) (Prussia); Order of the Redeemer (2nd Class) (Greece); Royal Order of Kalākaua (1st Class) (Hawaii); Order of the Tower and Sword (Portugal); Order of St Anne (1st Class) (Russia); Order of Osmanieh (2nd Class) (Turkey)
- Other work: Keeper of the Privy Purse

General Sir Dighton Macnaghten Probyn, VC, GCB, GCSI, GCVO, ISO, PC (21 January 1833 – 20 June 1924) was a British Army officer and an English recipient of the Victoria Cross, the highest award for gallantry in the face of the enemy that can be awarded to British and Commonwealth forces.

== Early career ==
The son of Captain George Probyn and Alicia Workman, daughter of Sir Francis Workman Macnaghten, 1st Baronet, Dighton Probyn entered the light cavalry arm of the East India Company's Bengal Army as a cornet in 1849, being posted into the 6th Light Cavalry. In 1852, he was appointed adjutant of the newly raised 2nd Punjab Cavalry which formed part of the 11,000 strong Punjab Irregular Force responsible for policing the Trans-Indus Frontier.

At the time of the outbreak of the Indian Rebellion of 1857, on 10 May 1857, Dighton Probyn was at Jullundur, the station of the 6th Bengal Light Cavalry. Probyn's squadron of the 2nd Punjab Cavalry fought throughout the uprising, with Probyn being 'Mentioned in Despatches' many times for his actions.

By the end of 1857 the squadron of 2nd Punjab Cavalry which Probyn commanded was frequently referred to as Probyn's Horse, as Lieutenant E. H. Verney, RN, records in The Shannon's Brigade in India:

Two bodies of irregular Sikh cavalry are attached to the main army; one is distinguished by wearing red turbans, is commanded by Captain Hodson of the Indian Army, and is known as Hodson's Horse; the other wears blue turbans, is commanded by Lieutenant Probyn of the Indian Army, and is known as Probyn's Horse. Their dress consists of the whitey-brown 'kharki', each man is armed with a tulwa and brace of pistols, and one or two troops with lances. To command a regiment of these semi-barbarous troopers requires no small ability, tact, and personal courage, as well as knowledge of the native character, and both Probyn and Hodson are beloved by their wild horsemen. They are generally splendidly mounted, and each horse is the private property of his rider.

During the final days of the fall of Lucknow in early 1858, the 2nd Punjab Cavalry was constantly engaged in patrolling and was frequently sent short distances in pursuit of fleeing mutineers and rebels. By this time, Probyn, worn down by the rigours of continual campaigning, was invalided back to England on 18 March 1858. By now a captain, he was brevetted to major in the regular army on 24 March 1858. Probyn was brevetted to the rank of lieutenant-colonel in the Bengal Army on 15 February 1861. He was brevetted to colonel on 15 February 1866 and to major-general on 25 July 1870.

== Victoria Cross ==
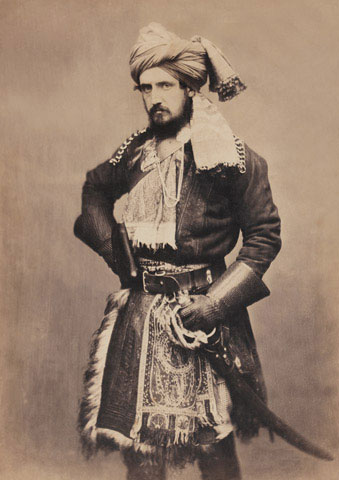
'Dighton Probyn, 2nd Punjab Cavalry, in Indian dress', 1857 (c).

Probyn was 24 years old, and a captain in the 2nd Punjab Cavalry, Bengal Army during the Indian Mutiny when the following deeds took place for which he was awarded the VC:

Has been distinguished for gallantry and daring throughout this campaign. At the battle of Agra, when his squadron charged the rebel infantry, he was some time separated from his men, and surrounded by five or six sepoys. He defended himself from the various cuts made at him, and before his own men had joined him had cut down two of his assailants. At another time, in single combat with a sepoy, he was wounded in the wrist, by the bayonet, and his horse also was slightly wounded; but, though the sepoy fought desperately, he cut him down. The same day he singled out a standard bearer, and, in the presence of a number of the enemy, killed him and captured the standard. These are only a few of the gallant deeds of this brave young officer. Despatch from Major-General James Hope Grant, K.C.B., dated 10 January 1858.

His VC sold at auction on 24 September 2005 for £160,000.

== Royal courtier ==
On 4 March 1872, the Prince of Wales, later Edward VII, appointed him as one of his equerries. He was knighted as a Knight Commander of the Order of the Star of India (KCSI) on 7 March 1876, and was brevetted to lieutenant-general on 1 October 1877. He was promoted to the substantive rank of lieutenant-colonel in the Bengal Cavalry on 1 April 1881, and was transferred to the unemployed list on 1 July 1882. He was appointed a Knight Commander of the Order of the Bath, Civil Division (KCB) in the 1887 Golden Jubilee Honours. On 1 December 1888, he was promoted to the local rank of general in the British Indian Army while unemployed, and was promoted to the substantive rank of colonel in the Bengal Cavalry on 1 April 1893. He was appointed one of the first Knights Grand Cross of the Royal Victorian Order (GCVO) on 26 May 1896.

He was a councillor of the Oxford Military College in Cowley, Oxfordshire from 1876 to 1896, and was appointed a member of the Privy Council on 9 February 1901. He was promoted to a Knight Grand Cross of the (civil division) Order of the Bath (GCB) in the 1902 Coronation Honours list published on 26 June 1902, and was invested by King Edward VII at Buckingham Palace on 8 August 1902. He was appointed a Companion of the Imperial Service Order (ISO) on 22 July 1903. He was appointed a Knight Commander of the Order of the Bath, Military Division (KCB (Mil.)) on 20 October 1909.

He was in later life an ornament of the Victorian age, being Keeper of the Privy Purse, a court sinecure position as well as Secretary to the Prince of Wales and Comptroller of the Household. The latter two were important positions as the Prince and Princess were both profligate in spending and Probyn had a hard job to keep them solvent. Testimony to his success was that, when the Prince acceded at last in 1901, he was in credit at the bank. Probyn had difficulty hiding the King's extravagance, which the minister Charles Hobhouse refused to defend in the Commons.

Probyn continued in this role throughout the King's rule and right up to his death. He was appointed an Extra Equerry to King Edward VII in 1902.

Probyn was totally devoted to the Princess, then Queen-Empress, building gardens for her at Windsor Castle and Sandringham House. The Queen returned the devotion, carrying round a knife with her to cut open his collar when he occasionally had seizures.

In 1915 Probyn gave an engraved wristwatch to Captain Frank Beck, the officer who led the Sandringham Volunteers in the First World War. After he was killed during the Gallipoli Campaign, it was bought from a Turkish officer after the war and returned to Beck's family in 1922.

Probyn had an impressive appearance in old age with a very long white beard reaching down to his navel which concealed his VC on ceremonial occasions.

== Death ==
Probyn died on 20 June 1924.

== Family ==
Probyn married, in 1872, Letitia Maria Thellusson, daughter of Thomas Robarts Thellusson. Lady Probyn died at Park House, Sandringham, Norfolk, on 17 January 1900.

== Legacy ==
The 5th King Edward's Own Probyn's Horse popularly called Probyn's Horse, a regiment of the British Indian Army, was named after him; it is now part of the Pakistan Army and officially designated as 5 Horse.

Probynabad, a town in Punjab province of Pakistan with large farmlands owned by the regiment is also named after him.

An Iris iberica hybrid was named 'Sir Dighton Probyn' in 1909 by Professor M. Foster.
