= Canga's bead symptom =

Radiologic sign

In radiology, Canga's bead symptom is the irregular appearance of uterus and nodular structures in tuba uterina observed in patients with genital tuberculosis. It is named for Serif Canga (1906–1993), a Turkish Gynecologist, in 1971.
