= Dudley Colles =

Irish Royal Navy officer and courtier

Sir Dudley Colles KCB KCVO OBE
- Colles in 1960
- Born: 5 April 1889; Kilkenny, Ireland
- Died: 13 July 1976 (aged 87); London, England
- Military career
- Allegiance: United Kingdom
- Branch: Royal Navy
- Service years: 1906-1932
- Rank: Commander
- Conflicts: First World War
- Awards: Knight Commander of the Order of the Bath; Knight Commander of the Royal Victorian Order; Officer of the Order of the British Empire
- Other work: Courtier

Commander Sir Ernest Dudley Gordon Colles KCB KCVO OBE (5 April 1889 – 13 July 1976) was an Irish Royal Navy officer and courtier, who served in the Royal Households of George VI and Elizabeth II.

Colles was educated at Winchester College and was commissioned into the Royal Navy in 1906. He served as a Naval Paymaster for 26 years, and saw active in the First World War. He became an Officer of the Order of the British Empire in June 1919. He subsequently became Secretary to the Third Sea Lord and Second Sea Lord, followed by a period serving as the Secretary to the Commander-in-Chief, North America and West Indies Station. Colles retired as a Paymaster Commander in 1932.

After leaving the navy, Colles joined the Royal Household as a Secretary of the Privy Purse. In 1936, while working as the Registrar of the Royal Victorian Order, he was invested as a Member of that order, and he was advanced to Commander in 1943. Between 1941 and 1952 he served as Deputy Treasurer to George VI, and held the same position in the household of Elizabeth II from 1962 to 1958. In 1949 he was made a Knight Commander of the Royal Victorian Order and in 1953 he became a Knight Commander of the Order of the Bath. In 1958, he became an Extra Equerry to the Queen.

Colles also received honours from several foreign governments, including being made a Knight Commander of the Danish Order of the Dannebrog, a Commander of the Dutch Order of the House of Orange and a Knight Commander of the French Legion of Honour.
