= Keeper of the Royal Archives =

Official of the British royal household

The Keeper of the Royal Archives is responsible for the papers held in the Royal Archives, and is accountable to the King.

Since 1945, the office of Keeper of the Royal Archives in the Royal Household of the Sovereign of the United Kingdom has been held concurrently with that of Private Secretary to the Sovereign.

== Office holders ==
Reginald Brett, 2nd Viscount Esher was the first appointment as Keeper of the Royal Archives.

- Clive Wigram (1931 to 1945)
- Sir Alan Lascelles (1945 to 1953)
- Sir Michael Adeane (1953 to 1972)
- Sir Martin Charteris (1972 to 1977)
- Sir Phillip Moore (1977 to 1986)
- Sir William Heseltine (1986 to 1990)
- Sir Robert Fellowes (1990 to 1999)
- Sir Robin Janvrin (1999 to 2007)
- Sir Christopher Geidt (2007-2017)
- Sir Edward Young (2017-2023)
- Sir Clive Alderton is the current Keeper of the Royal Archives since 2022.
