= Edward Young, Baron Young of Old Windsor =

British courtier (born 1966)

The Right Honourable The Lord Young of Old Windsor GCB GCVO PC
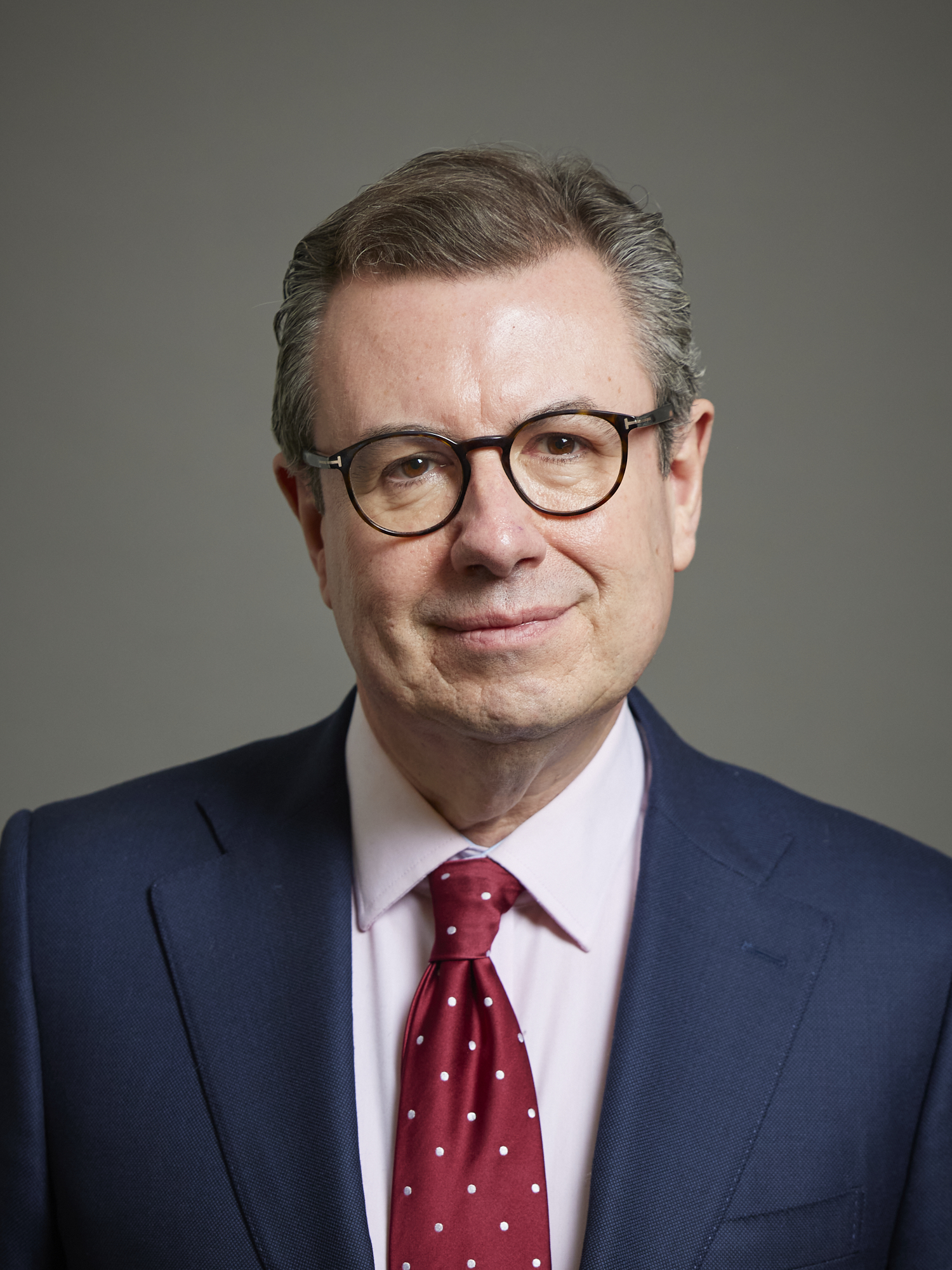
- Official portrait, 2024

Private Secretary to the Sovereign
- In office 17 October 2017 – 15 May 2023 Serving with Sir Clive Alderton (2022–2023)
- Monarchs: Elizabeth II; Charles III
- Preceded by: Christopher Geidt
- Succeeded by: Sir Clive Alderton

Deputy Private Secretary to the Sovereign
- In office 8 September 2007 – 17 October 2017
- Monarch: Elizabeth II
- Preceded by: Christopher Geidt
- Succeeded by: Tom Laing-Baker (performing the duties of)

Member of the House of Lords
- Lord Temporal
- Life peerage 13 June 2023

Personal details
- Born: 24 October 1966 (age 60)
- Party: None (crossbencher)
- Children: 1
- Education: Reading School

Edward Young, Baron Young of Old Windsor, GCB, GCVO, PC (born 24 October 1966) is a British courtier who served as Private Secretary to the Sovereign from 2017 to 2023. In this role, he was the senior operational member of the Royal Households of the United Kingdom and oversaw the transition from Queen Elizabeth II to King Charles III. Young was recruited to the Royal Household in 2004, serving as Queen Elizabeth II's assistant and then as deputy private secretary until his promotion to private secretary in 2017. After the death of Elizabeth II in 2022, Young served as joint principal private secretary to King Charles III until he stepped down in May 2023.

== Early life and career ==
Young was born on 24 October 1966 to Edward Young and Sally Rougier Young. He was educated at Reading School in Berkshire, where he was a boarder.

Young worked for the international side of Barclays Bank between 1985 and 1997, where he held a range of executive roles, including a specialist in international trade finance and a manager for the Corporate Bank European Currency Programme. In 1997, he moved to Barclays' Head Office to become the bank's Deputy Head of Corporate Public Relations.

From late 1999 to 2001, he was an advisor to Michael Portillo, the Conservative Party's shadow chancellor of the Exchequer, and then to the party's Leader of the Opposition, William Hague. In 2001, Young was appointed Head of Communications at Granada plc, working primarily on the merger with Carlton Communications to form ITV plc in 2004.

== Royal Household ==
=== Assistant and Deputy Private Secretary (2004–2017) ===
Young became an assistant private secretary to Queen Elizabeth II in September 2004. He was promoted to Deputy Private Secretary in September 2007 after the promotion of Christopher Geidt from Deputy Private Secretary to Private Secretary, on the retirement of Sir Robin Janvrin, Private Secretary from 1997 to 2007.

As Deputy Private Secretary, he played a key role in the planning of the Queen's visit to the Republic of Ireland in 2011. He is credited with assisting the Queen in writing the highly praised speech, which she began with a few words in the Irish language. The Queen's visit was hailed as a diplomatic triumph that improved Anglo-Irish relations.

Young led the national planning of the Diamond Jubilee of Queen Elizabeth II, which took place in 2012. He persuaded Elizabeth to take part in the James Bond helicopter sketch in the opening ceremony of the 2012 Summer Olympics in London.

=== Private Secretary (2017–2023) ===
Young became Private Secretary in 2017, on Geidt's retirement. As Private Secretary, Young also served as Keeper of the Royal Archives and a Trustee of the Royal Collection Trust.

As head of the Private Secretary's Office, Young had direct control over the Press Office, the office of the Director for Security Liaison, the research, correspondence, anniversaries and records offices, and the Royal Archives.

As Private Secretary, Young was a member of the so-called 'golden triangle' of senior British officials – the others being the Cabinet Secretary and the Principal Private Secretary to the Prime Minister – with key responsibilities in the event of a hung parliament in the United Kingdom.

=== Harry and Meghan ===
In Prince Harry's memoir Spare, Young is given the nickname 'the Bee'. Harry wrote: "The Bee was oval-faced and fuzzy and tended to glide around with great equanimity and poise ... He was so poised that people didn't fear him. Big mistake. Sometimes their last mistake."

On 11 March 2021, The Times reported that royal historian Robert Lacey stated that Young had a share of the responsibility for the so-called Megxit royal crisis after the Oprah with Meghan and Harry U.S. CBS television interview. Lacey charged that Young "should have sat down with Meghan, Duchess of Sussex and explained precisely" her "relatively minor ranking" after her marriage to Prince Harry in 2018. However, others, including the Daily Telegraph's Gordon Rayner, have argued that Young was simply trying to 'save Prince Harry from himself'.

=== Death of Queen Elizabeth II ===
Young was one of the last people to spend time with Queen Elizabeth II before her death in September 2022. Elizabeth's final diary entry reportedly records a meeting with Young. "Edward came to see me."

Young wrote that Queen Elizabeth II's final moments at Balmoral were "very peaceful" and pain-free. It was Young who broke the news of Elizabeth's death to King Charles III, informing him that he was King. Elizabeth left two private letters after she died, one addressed to Young, the other to Charles.

Young took part in the royal procession at the 2023 coronation.

== Career post-Palace ==
On 15 May 2023, Buckingham Palace announced that Young was retiring after 19 years of service to the Royal Family.

Following his retirement as private secretary to the sovereign, Young was granted a peerage, made a permanent lord-in-waiting, and appointed a Knight Grand Cross of the Order of the Bath and a Knight Grand Cross of the Royal Victorian Order.

On 13 June 2023, Young was created a life peer as Baron Young of Old Windsor, of Old Windsor in the Royal County of Berkshire, and was introduced to the House of Lords on 15 June. He sits as a crossbencher and made his maiden speech on 15 November 2023.

In July 2024, Young was appointed as Senior Adviser to Pictet, the Swiss multinational private bank and financial services company. He was also appointed as Global Chairman, Family Office Practice, for APCO Worldwide. Young is a member of the House of Lords Finance Select Committee and of the UK National Public Services Honours Committee. In June 2025, Young was appointed as a non-executive director to GSA Global Ltd.

== Cultural depictions ==
Young was played by Alex Jennings in the 2024 three-part Amazon Prime drama A Very Royal Scandal. The drama concludes with a stand-off between Young and Prince Andrew (played by Michael Sheen) following the disastrous BBC Newsnight interview of 2019. Young is depicted coldly informing the Duke that he must live with the consequences of his actions.

== Honours and awards ==
Young was appointed Lieutenant of the Royal Victorian Order (LVO) in the 2010 Birthday Honours, and was promoted to Commander (CVO) in the 2015 Birthday Honours, and Knight Commander (KCVO) in the 2020 New Year Honours. Upon his leaving office as Private Secretary to the Sovereign, King Charles III appointed Young a Knight Grand Cross of the Order of the Bath (GCB) and a Knight Grand Cross of the Royal Victorian Order (GCVO). Young was also granted a peerage and made a permanent lord-in-waiting.

On 11 October 2017, Young was sworn of the Privy Council.

Knight Grand Cross of the Most Honourable Order of the Bath (GCB)	2023 Special Honours
Knight Grand Cross of the Royal Victorian Order (GCVO)	2023 Special Honours
Knight Commander of the Royal Victorian Order (KCVO)	2020 New Year Honours
Commander of the Royal Victorian Order (CVO)	2015 Birthday Honours
Lieutenant of the Royal Victorian Order (LVO)	2010 Birthday Honours
Queen Elizabeth II Diamond Jubilee Medal	
Queen Elizabeth II Platinum Jubilee Medal	
King Charles III Coronation Medal	

Court offices
Preceded by Stuart Shilson	Assistant Private Secretary to the Sovereign; 2004–2007	Succeeded by Douglas King
Preceded by Christopher Geidt	Deputy Private Secretary to the Sovereign; 2007–2017	Vacant Title next held by John Sorabji
Preceded by Sir Christopher Geidt	Private Secretary to the Sovereign; 2017–2023	Succeeded by Sir Clive Alderton
Orders of precedence in the United Kingdom
Preceded by The Lord Sewell of Sanderstead	Gentlemen; Baron Young of Old Windsor	Followed by The Lord Mott
