= Kenneth Scott (courtier) =

British diplomat (1931–2018)

Sir Kenneth Scott KCVO CMG

Deputy Private Secretary to the Sovereign
- In office 1990–1996
- Monarch: Elizabeth II
- Secretary: Robert Fellowes
- Preceded by: Robert Fellowes
- Succeeded by: Robin Janvrin

Assistant Private Secretary to the Sovereign
- In office 1985–1990
- Monarch: Elizabeth II
- Secretary: Philip Moore; William Heseltine
- Deputy Secretary: William Heseltine; Robert Fellowes
- Preceded by: Robert Fellowes
- Succeeded by: Robin Janvrin

Personal details
- Born: 23 January 1931 Belfast, Northern Ireland
- Died: 23 February 2018 (aged 87) Royal Infirmary of Edinburgh
- Children: 2

Sir Kenneth Bertram Adam Scott KCVO CMG (23 January 1931 – 23 February 2018) was the Deputy Private Secretary to Elizabeth II between 1990 and 1996.

== Career ==
Born on 23 January 1931 in Belfast, he was educated at George Watson's College, Edinburgh (Governor, 1997–present) and the University of Edinburgh, where he graduated with an MA (Hons).

After university, Scott joined the Diplomatic Service and served in posts including Moscow, Bonn, Washington and Brussels. He was Ambassador to Yugoslavia in 1982–85.

He was the Queen's Assistant Private Secretary 1985–90 and Deputy Private Secretary 1990–96, during which time he mostly lived in an apartment in St James's Palace. In 1996, after retirement from the Royal Household, he spent nine months in Sarajevo as Chairman of the Provisional Election Commission which organised the first democratic elections in Bosnia after the 1992–95 war. He remained an Extra Equerry to the Queen in retirement. He was made a KCVO in the 1990 New Year Honours, and a CMG in the 1980 Birthday Honours.

In 2010 he was author of the book St James's Palace: A History, by Scala Publishers (ISBN 9781857596595, ISBN 978-1-85759-659-5).

He died on 23 February 2018 at the age of 87.
