= Michael Shea (diplomat) =

British diplomat and author

Michael Shea CVO

Press Secretary to the Sovereign
- In office 1978–1987
- Monarch: Elizabeth II
- Prime Minister: James Callaghan; Margaret Thatcher
- Preceded by: Ronald Allison
- Succeeded by: The Lord Janvrin

Personal details
- Born: Michael Sinclair MacAuslan Shea; 10 May 1938 Carluke, Lanarkshire, Scotland
- Died: 17 October 2009 (aged 71) Edinburgh, Midlothian, Scotland
- Spouse: Mona Grec Stensen (m. 1968)
- Children: 2
- Education: Gordonstoun School; Lenzie Academy
- Alma mater: University of Edinburgh
- Occupation: Diplomat, author
- Military career
- Allegiance: United Kingdom
- Branch: British Army
- Service years: 1957–1961
- Unit: Royal Corps of Signals

Michael Sinclair MacAuslan Shea, CVO (10 May 1938 – 17 October 2009) was Press Secretary to Elizabeth II from 1978-87. Earlier he had been a career diplomat and was also an author of political thrillers and non-fiction.

== Early life ==
Until the age of 14 Shea attended Lenzie Academy, where his mother was a teacher. He then attended Gordonstoun as a result of gaining a scholarship. He graduated from the University of Edinburgh, having read Economics; he also completed his doctorate at University of Edinburgh on economic development in West Africa. He was commissioned during his National Service into the Royal Corps of Signals in 1957. He entered the Foreign Service in 1963 and served in Ghana, West Germany, Romania and New York.

== Royal press secretary ==
After helping to arrange the Queen's official visit to the United States Bicentennial celebrations in 1976, Shea became her press secretary two years later. He was at the centre of a "mole hunt" in 1986 for the person who gave a briefing to a journalist on The Sunday Times in which it was said that the social policies being followed by the Thatcher government were causing the Queen "dismay", and that Margaret Thatcher's negative attitude to the Commonwealth of Nations caused displeasure. Members of Parliament called for Shea's resignation if he was responsible. The Queen's Private Secretary, Sir William Heseltine, responded to the controversy in a letter to The Times confirming Shea as the contact, but asserting that Shea's comments had been misreported.

Shea left royal service the following year; some sources indicated that he was "dropped" from the role. He continued to deny that there was any connection with the earlier controversy. He was not knighted but was made a Lieutenant of the Victorian Order (LVO) in 1985 and Commander (CVO) in 1987.

== Other activities ==
While First Secretary in Bonn, then the capital of West Germany, Shea began his career as a writer. A thriller, Sonntag, was published under the pseudonym Michael Sinclair in 1971, the first of 20 books, most of them political thrillers, some set in the near future. State of the Nation (1997) and Endgame (2002) take place in an independent Scotland. His memoirs were published as A View from the Sidelines (2003).

After he resigned as the Queen's press secretary, Shea worked for six years at Hanson plc as director of public relations. He can be heard in a private interview given to Brendan Bruce (former Conservative Party Director of Communications under Margaret Thatcher) for his book Images of Power (Kogan Page 1992) in the British Library Sound Archive. Other activities included service with National Galleries of Scotland as a trustee, with the Royal Edinburgh Military Tattoo as a director, and with the Royal Lyceum Theatre as chairman. Shea was also among the group that revived the Edinburgh Oyster Club.

Michael Shea married Mona Grec Stensen, a native of Norway, in 1968. The couple had two daughters.

His last years were affected by the onset of dementia. He died at age 71 in 2009.

== In popular culture ==
Shea was portrayed by Nicholas Farrell in episode 8 of series 4 of The Crown, in a storyline focusing on apartheid and the alleged rift between Margaret Thatcher and Queen Elizabeth II.

== Partial bibliography ==
=== Fiction ===
- Sonntag (Littlehampton, 1971, ISBN 057500584X) [as by Michael Sinclair]
- Norslag (Littlehampton, 1972, ISBN 0575007540) [as by Michael Sinclair]
- Long Time Sleeping (Littlehampton, 1975, ISBN 0575019441) [as by Michael Sinclair]
- Tomorrow's Men (Weidenfeld & Nicolson, 1982, ISBN 0297781685)
- Spin Doctor (HarperCollins, 1996, ISBN 000649322X)
- The British Ambassador (HarperCollins, 1997, ISBN 0006493238)
- State of the Nation (HarperCollins, 1997, ISBN 0002254743)
- The Berlin Embassy (HarperCollins, 1999, ISBN 0006498760)
- The Shadows Fall (Severn House, 1999, ISBN 0727854836)
- Spinoff (HarperCollins, 2000, ISBN 0006498779)
- A Cold Conspiracy (Severn House, 2000, ISBN 0727856200)
- Break Point (Severn House, 2001, ISBN 0727857851)
- The Danube Enigma (Severn House, 2001, ISBN 0727857258)
- Endgame (Severn House, 2002, ISBN 0727857177)

=== Non-fiction ===
- Influence: How to Make The System Work for You – a handbook for the modern Machiavelli (Ebury, 1988, ISBN 0712623906)
- Personal Impact: Presence, Paralanguage and the Art of Good Communication (Sinclair-Stevenson, 1993, ISBN 1856192571)
- To Lie Abroad: Diplomacy Reviewed (Sinclair-Stevenson, 1996, ISBN 1856192547)
- The Primacy Effect: The Ultimate Guide to Effective Personal Communications (Orion, 1998, ISBN 0752811878)
- A View from the Sidelines (Sutton, 2003, ISBN 0750932457)
