= Mary Francis =

British civil servant

Mary Elizabeth Francis CBE LVO

Deputy Private Secretary to the Sovereign
- In office February 1999 – June 1999
- Monarch: Elizabeth II
- Secretary: Robin Janvrin
- Preceded by: Robin Janvrin
- Succeeded by: Christopher Geidt

Assistant Private Secretary to the Sovereign
- In office 1996 – February 1999
- Monarch: Elizabeth II
- Secretary: Robert Fellowes
- Deputy Secretary: Robin Janvrin
- Preceded by: Robin Janvrin
- Succeeded by: Tim Hitchens

Personal details
- Born: July 1948 (age 77)
- Known for: Director of Barclays

Mary Elizabeth Francis CBE LVO (née George; born July 1948) is a former British civil servant who focused primarily on financial and economic policy. She is a non-executive Director of Barclays plc and was a director of Valaris Limited. and PensionBee Group PLC where she is Senior Independent Director.

Mary Francis is also a senior advisor to Chatham House, a member of the advisory council of the Institute of Business Ethics, a member of the Takeover Panel Appeal Board, and an ambassador for the Almeida Theatre.

== Early life and education ==
Growing up in Petts Wood, Kent, Francis was educated at Crofton Primary School and James Allen's Girls' School in Dulwich, London. She read history at Newnham College, Cambridge.

== Career ==
After graduating, Francis became a research assistant to Professor Max Beloff at All Souls' College, Oxford. She subsequently joined the Civil Service, and held successive posts in the Civil Service Department and HM Treasury.

She was seconded to investment bank Hill Samuel from 1984 to 1986, led one of the Treasury privatisation teams from 1986 to 1988, and had policy responsibility for European Union matters in the Treasury from 1988 to 1990.

She a was Financial Counsellor in the Embassy of the United Kingdom, Washington, D.C. from 1990 to 1992, Private Secretary to Prime Minister John Major with responsibility for economic and business policy from 1992 to 1995, and Assistant/Deputy Private Secretary to The Queen from 1995 to 1999.

Mary Francis became Director General of the Association of British Insurers in 1999. From 2005 she held a number of non-executive directorships, including at the Bank of England, Centrica (where she was Senior Independent Director), Aviva, Cable & Wireless Communications and Swiss Re.
