= Tim Hitchens =

British diplomat

Sir Tim Hitchens KCVO CMG
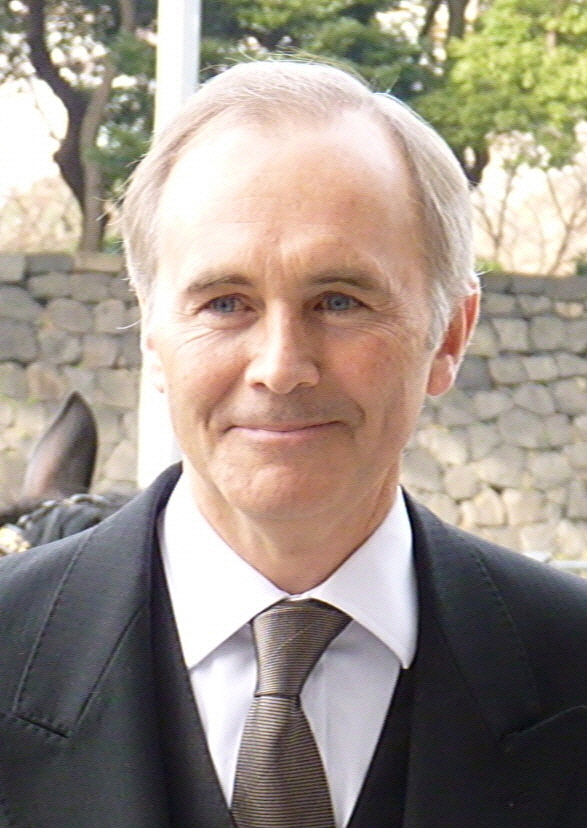

President of Wolfson College, Oxford
- Incumbent
- Assumed office 1 May 2018
- Preceded by: Hermione Lee

British Ambassador to Japan
- In office 2012–2016
- Monarch: Elizabeth II
- Prime Minister: David Cameron; Theresa May
- Preceded by: David Warren
- Succeeded by: Paul Madden

Assistant Private Secretary to the Sovereign
- In office 1999–2002
- Monarch: Elizabeth II
- Prime Minister: Tony Blair
- Preceded by: Mary Francis
- Succeeded by: Sir Christopher Geidt

Personal details
- Born: Timothy Mark Hitchens; 1962 (age 63–64) London, England
- Education: Dulwich College; University of Cambridge

Sir Timothy Mark Hitchens, KCVO, CMG (born 1962) is a British diplomat and a former Assistant Private Secretary to the Queen Elizabeth II, in the Royal Household of the Sovereign of the United Kingdom, 1999–2002.

Hitchens was seconded from the Foreign and Commonwealth Office, to which he returned to become Head of the Africa Department (Equatorial). He had been First Secretary Political and Information, British High Commission, Islamabad and speechwriter for Foreign Secretary Douglas Hurd.

== Early life and career ==
Hitchens was born in 1962 and educated at Dulwich College from 1972 to 1979. He then attended Christ's College, University of Cambridge, where he read English literature. After joining the Foreign and Commonwealth Office, he studied Japanese, and then became Trade Secretary in Tokyo.

== Career ==
Hitchens was Private Secretary to The Rt Hon Tristan Garel-Jones, Minister of State for Europe at the Foreign and Commonwealth Office, 1990 to 1993, and speechwriter to the Foreign Secretary, The Rt Hon Douglas Hurd, from 1993 to 1994. He was Head of the Political Section at the British Embassy in Islamabad, Pakistan, 1994 to 1997.

From 2005 to 2008, Hitchens was Deputy Ambassador at the British Embassy in Paris.

From autumn 2008, Hitchens took up the position of Director, European Political Affairs, in London. In August 2010, he became Director, Africa.

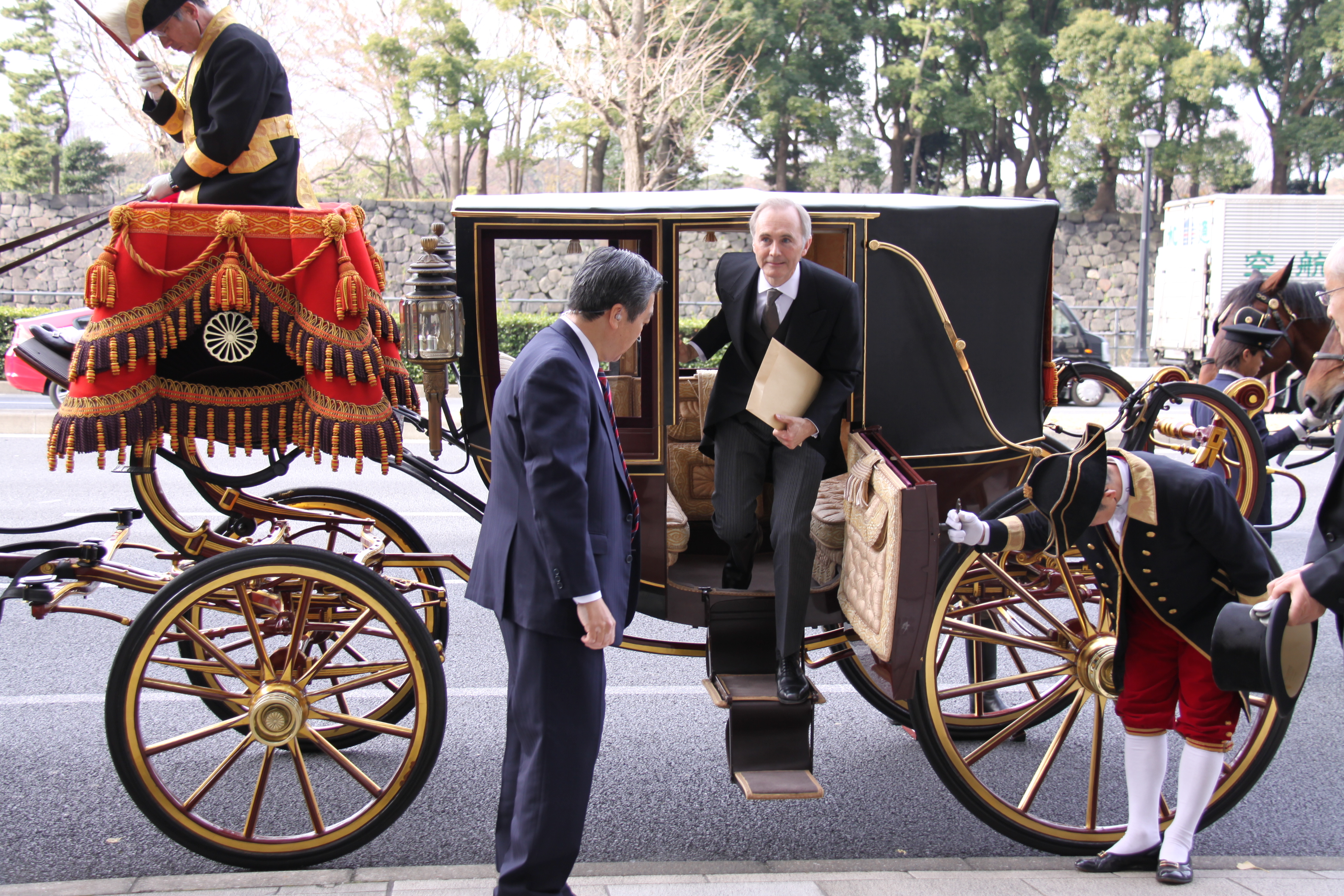
At the Tokyo Imperial Palace

In 2012, Hitchens was appointed HM Ambassador to Japan. He opened a Twitter account under the handle 'UKAmbTim' and, as of May 17, 2015, had over 7,000 followers. He often tweets in Japanese. Hitchens was succeeded by Paul Madden in January 2017.

In March 2017, Hitchens was appointed chief executive officer of the Commonwealth Summit 2018.

In January 2017, Hitchens was elected President of Wolfson College, Oxford. He assumed this post on 1 May 2018.

== Honours ==
Hitchens was appointed Companion of the Order of St Michael and St George (CMG) in the 2012 New Year Honours.

== Personal life ==
Hitchens is the son of Rear Admiral Gilbert A.F. Hitchens CB RN, who was Royal Naval attaché in Japan (February 1977 – February 1979).

Hitchens has one daughter (born 1991) and one son (born 1993).

== Sources ==
- British ambassador laments his two ‘lost decades’ The Japan Times, 9 April 2013

Diplomatic posts
Preceded by Sir David Warren	British Ambassador to Japan; 2012–2016	Succeeded by Paul Madden
Academic offices
Preceded by Philomen Probert (acting)	President of Wolfson College, Oxford; 2018–present	Succeeded by Incumbent
