= Wedding of Prince Henry and Lady Alice Montagu Douglas Scott =

1935 British royal wedding

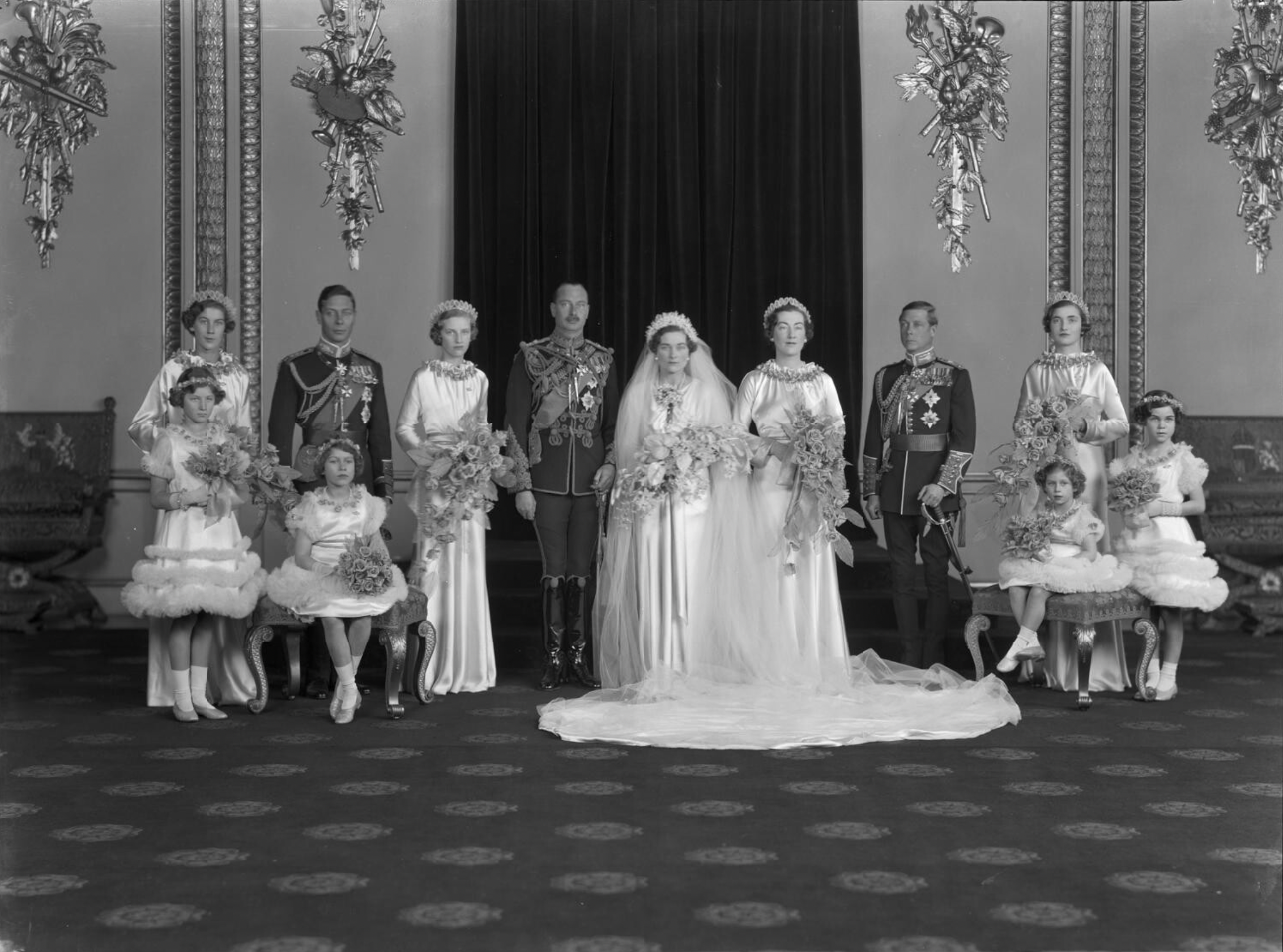
- Henry and Alice with their bridesmaids and groomsmen
- Date: 6 November 1935; 90 years ago
- Venue: Buckingham Palace
- Location: London, England, United Kingdom
- Participants: Prince Henry, Duke of Gloucester; Lady Alice Montagu Douglas Scott

The wedding of Prince Henry, Duke of Gloucester, and Lady Alice Montagu Douglas Scott took place on Wednesday, 6 November 1935, in the private chapel at Buckingham Palace. A larger public ceremony had been planned for Westminster Abbey, but plans were scaled back after the bride's father, the 7th Duke of Buccleuch, died of cancer on 19 October.

== Engagement ==
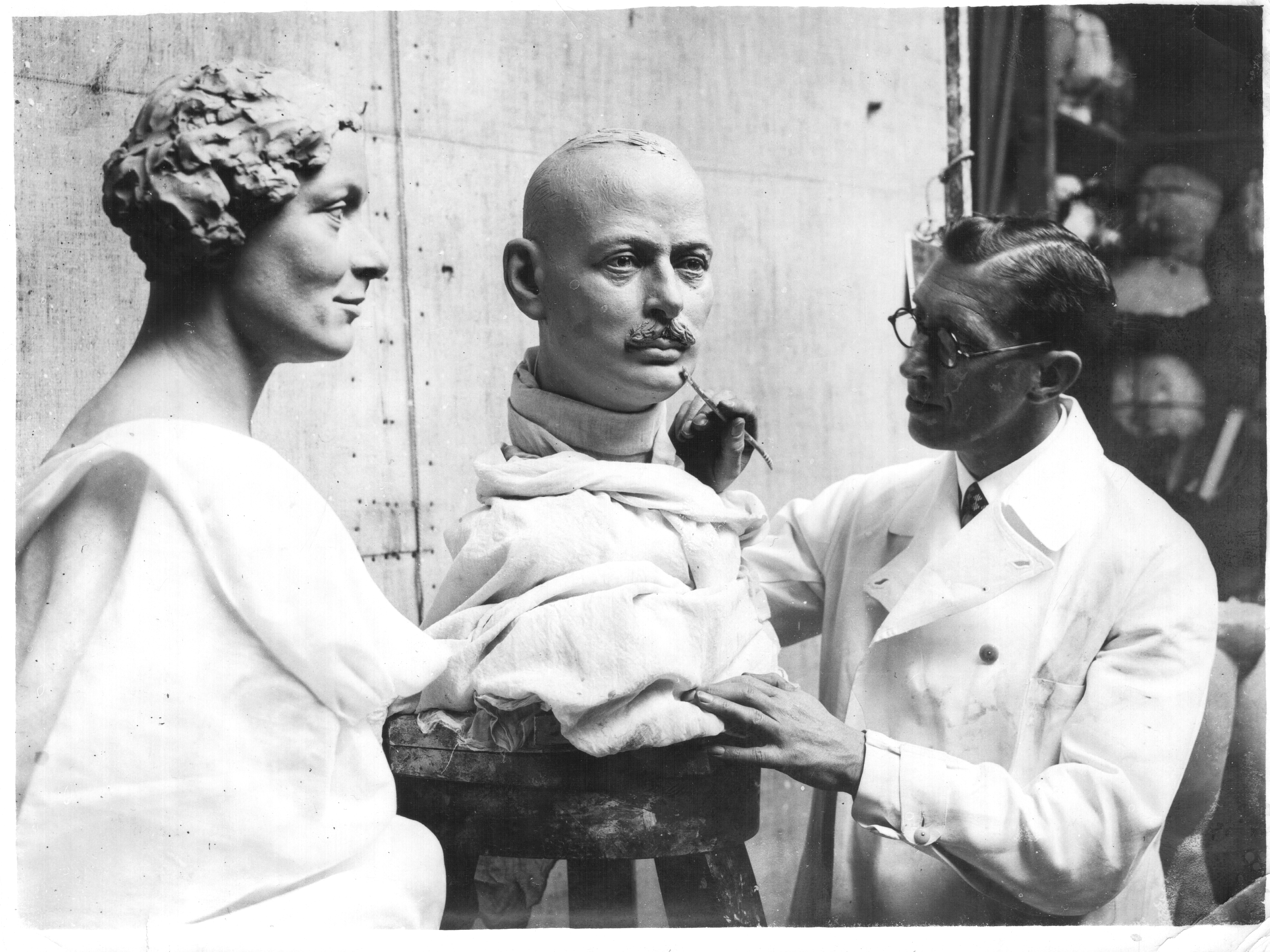
The couple being sculpted at Madame Tussauds, October 1936

The engagement between Prince Henry, Duke of Gloucester, third son of King George V and Queen Mary, and Lady Alice Montagu Douglas Scott, third daughter of the 7th Duke and Duchess of Buccleuch, was announced on 2 September 1935 at Balmoral Castle.

Alice later recalled there was no formal proposal and the Duke had "mumbled it as we were on a walk one day."

The wedding date was set for 6 November 1935 and plans were in place for a lavish public celebration at Westminster Abbey like the weddings of the Duke's siblings. However, mere weeks before the wedding, the bride's father died of cancer on 19 October 1935. This, in combination with the consideration of the King's ill health, led to the wedding being moved to the more modest venue of the private chapel at Buckingham Palace.

== Wedding ==
The wedding took place on 6 November 1935 in the private chapel at Buckingham Palace.

That morning, the Duke had breakfast with his parents, the King and Queen, at Buckingham Palace. Lady Alice left her family's home in Grosvenor Place in the Glass Coach with her brother, the 8th Duke of Buccleuch. They made the short journey to Buckingham Palace by way of Constitution Hill through Wellington Arch. At the palace, they joined the bridesmaids and proceeded into the chapel.

Cosmo Gordon Lang, Archbishop of Canterbury, presided over the traditional Anglican ceremony, assisted by Arthur Winnington-Ingram, Bishop of London, and Arthur Maclean, Primus of the Scottish Episcopal Church.

=== Music ===
The hymn "Praise, my soul, the King of heaven" was sung and the recessional music was "Wedding March" from A Midsummer Night's Dream by Felix Mendelssohn.

=== Attendants ===
The Duke was supported by his two elder brothers, the Prince of Wales and the Duke of York. Lady Alice was attended by eight bridesmaids: Princess Elizabeth of York and Princess Margaret of York, the daughters of the Duke and Duchess of York; Lady Mary Cambridge; Lady Angela Montagu Douglas Scott, the bride's sister; Lady Elizabeth Montagu Douglas Scott, Anne Hawkins and Claire Phillips, nieces of the bride; and Moyra Scott, the bride's cousin.

=== Attire ===
Lady Alice wore a blush pink satin gown designed by Norman Hartnell. This choice of colour was unusual for a royal bride; however, due to her age, Lady Alice wished to have a "less maiden tone". The dress was "of modest simplicity, with long, narrow sleeves and a high neckline draped into a nosegay of artificial orange-blossom". The veil was made from "a drifting cloud of crisp modern tulle". On her way to the private chapel at Buckingham Palace, Alice wore "an ermine blanket stole" due to the cold weather. The gown was the first of many important gowns designed by Hartnell for the British royal family. He would later go on to design Princess Elizabeth's wedding gown and later her coronation gown, as well as Princess Margaret's wedding gown.

The Duke wore the uniform of the 10th Royal Hussars with the riband and star of the Order of the Garter, star of the Order of the Thistle and the Royal Victorian Chain.

=== Gifts ===
The couple received a large number of gifts from individuals, organizations and members of their families. The gifts were publicly displayed at St James's Palace.

The groom gave his bride a diamond tiara and diamond knot brooch. The King and Queen presented their new daughter-in-law with a pearl, emerald and diamond suite containing gems that had originally belonged to Queen Alexandra, and a diamond and pearl suite featuring a large baroque pearl brooch. The Queen gave her a turquoise and diamond parure which she herself had received as a wedding gift from her own parents, the Duke and Duchess of Teck, in 1893, and a diamond tiara. The groom's nieces and nephews, Princess Elizabeth, Princess Margaret Rose, Viscount Lascelles and the Hon. Gerald Lascelles gave two grenade-shaped cigarette lighters. The groom's aunt and uncle, Queen Maud and King Haakon VII of Norway, and cousin and cousin-in-law, Crown Prince Olav and Crown Princess Märtha, sent a silver and enamel desk set.

Before his death, the bride's father presented her with a single string of pearls which was exhibited with the other presents. The Dowager Duchess of Buccleuch gave her daughter a portrait of herself and a diamond and turquoise needlework box.

Other gifts included: a pair of silver porringers and covers from City of York; a gold cigarette case from Lord Howard de Walden; a pair of silver quaiches from Admiral and Mrs Mark Kerr; and three Steuben glass fish from Mrs Roxana Wentworth van Rensselaer.

== Guests ==
Owing to the scaled-back celebrations and the small size of the private chapel, the wedding was attended by just over 100 guests, mostly close family and friends.

=== Relatives of the groom ===
- The King and Queen, the groom's parents
  - The Prince of Wales, the groom's brother
  - The Duke and Duchess of York, the groom's brother and sister-in-law
    - Princess Elizabeth of York, the groom's niece
    - Princess Margaret of York, the groom's niece
  - The Princess Royal and the Earl of Harewood, the groom's sister and brother-in-law
    - Viscount Lascelles, the groom's nephew
    - The Hon. Gerald Lascelles, the groom's nephew
  - The Duke of Kent and The Duchess of Kent the groom's brother and sister-in-law
- Louise, Princess Royal's family:
  - Princess and Prince Arthur of Connaught, the groom's paternal first cousin and the groom's paternal first cousin once removed
  - Lady Maud and Lord Carnegie, the groom's paternal first cousin and her husband
- The Queen of Norway, the groom's paternal aunt
- The Princess Helena's family:
  - Princess Helena Victoria, the groom's paternal first cousin once removed
  - Princess Marie Louise, the groom's paternal first cousin once removed
- The Princess Louise, Duchess of Argyll, the groom's paternal great-aunt
- The Duke of Connaught and Strathearn, the groom's paternal great-uncle
  - Lady Patricia and The Hon. Sir Alexander Ramsay, the groom's paternal first cousin once removed and her husband
    - Alexander Ramsay, the groom's paternal second cousin
- The Earl of Athlone and Princess Alice, Countess of Athlone, the groom's maternal uncle and aunt (also first cousin once removed)
- The Princess Beatrice, the groom's paternal great-aunt
- Adolphus Cambridge, 1st Marquess of Cambridge's family:
  - The Marquess and Marchioness of Cambridge, the groom's maternal first cousin and his wife
    - Lady Mary Cambridge, the groom's maternal first cousin once removed
- King George II of the Hellenes, the groom's paternal second cousin
- Princess Paul of Yugoslavia, the groom's paternal second cousin
- The Crown Prince of Sweden, husband of the groom's paternal second cousin

=== Relatives of the bride ===
- The Dowager Duchess of Buccleuch and Queensberry, the bride's mother
  - Lady Margaret and Commander Geoffrey Hawkins, the bride's sister and brother-in-law
    - Miss Anne Hawkins, the bride's niece
  - The Duke and Duchess of Buccleuch and Queensberry, the bride's brother and sister-in-law
    - Lady Elizabeth Montagu Douglas Scott, the bride's niece
    - Earl of Dalkeith, the bride's nephew
    - Lady Caroline Montagu Douglas Scott, the bride's niece
  - Lord William Montagu Douglas Scott, the bride's brother
  - Lady Sybil and Mr Charles Phipps, the bride's sister and brother-in-law
    - Miss Clare Phipps, the bride's niece
  - Lady and Lord Burghley, the bride's sister and brother-in-law
  - Lady Angela Montagu Douglas Scott, the bride's sister
  - Lord George Montagu Douglas Scott, the bride's brother
- The Dowager Countess of Bradford, the bride's maternal grandmother
- Lord George Montagu Douglas Scott, the bride's paternal uncle
  - Miss Moyra Montagu Douglas Scott, the bride's paternal first cousin

=== Other notable guests ===
- Stanley Baldwin, Prime Minister, and Lucy Baldwin
- The Viscount Hailsham, Lord Chancellor, and the Viscountess Hailsham
- Sir John Simon, Home Secretary

== Aftermath ==
After the ceremony, the newlyweds proceeded from the chapel to an adjoining drawing room to sign the register. Afterward, they appeared with their families on the palace balcony. The crowds were especially delighted by the appearance of Princess Elizabeth and Princess Margaret Rose. They returned inside for a short wedding breakfast.

After the wedding breakfast, the couple departed Buckingham Palace in the 1902 State Landau for St Pancras Station. From St Pancras, they took the Silver Jubilee to Kettering for a honeymoon at nearby Boughton House, one of the bride's family homes.
