= Lord Fellowes =

Lord Fellowes may refer to:

- Robert Fellowes, Baron Fellowes (1941–2024), British courtier and Private Secretary to the Sovereign
- Julian Fellowes, Baron Fellowes of West Stafford (born 1949), English actor, novelist and filmmaker
