= Lord Moore =

Lord Moore may refer to:

- Philip Moore, Baron Moore of Wolvercote (1921–2009), Private Secretary to Queen Elizabeth II from 1977 to 1986
- John Moore, Baron Moore of Lower Marsh (1937–2019), British politician, cabinet minister under Margaret Thatcher
- Charles Moore, Baron Moore of Etchingham (born 1956), British journalist, former editor of The Daily Telegraph, The Spectator and The Sunday Telegraph
