= Anne Wall =

British aristocrat and lady-in-waiting

Dame Anne Wall DCVO
- Born: Alice Anne Hawkins; 31 March 1928
- Died: 28 October 2016 (aged 88)
- Spouse: Michael Wall (m. 1975)
- Parents: Sir Geoffrey Hawkins (father); Lady Margaret Montagu Douglas Scott (mother)
- Relatives: Princess Alice, Duchess of Gloucester (maternal aunt)

Dame Alice Anne Wall (née Hawkins; 31 March 1928 – 28 October 2016) was a British aristocrat who was assistant press secretary and later lady-in-waiting to Queen Elizabeth II.

== Biography ==
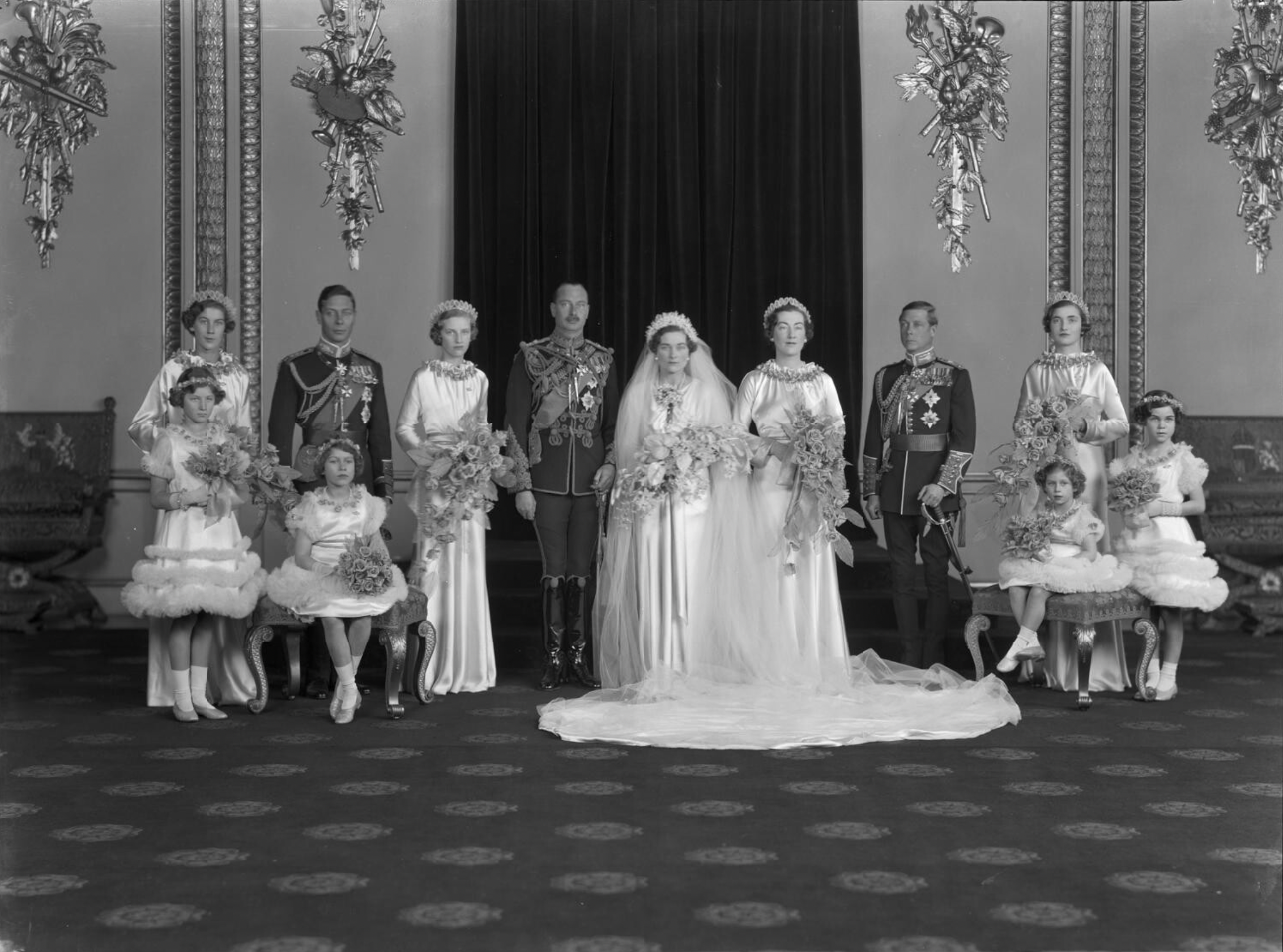
Wall, far right, as a bridesmaid at the wedding of her aunt, Lady Alice Montagu Douglas Scott, and Prince Henry, Duke of Gloucester, 6 November 1935

Wall was born on 31 March 1928. She was the elder daughter of Admiral Sir Geoffrey Hawkins and his wife, Lady Margaret Montagu Douglas Scott (1893–1976), eldest daughter of the 7th Duke of Buccleuch. Her maternal aunt was Princess Alice, Duchess of Gloucester. In 1935, she and the future Queen Elizabeth II were bridesmaids at her aunt's wedding to Prince Henry, Duke of Gloucester.

In 1958, Wall became the Queen's assistant press secretary. In 1972, she accompanied the Queen to Canada for the Montreal Olympics. When Robin Ludlow resigned as press secretary to the Sovereign, The Times campaigned for Wall to replace him, but it deemed not the right time for a woman press secretary. He was instead succeeded by Ronald Allison.

On 27 June 1975, she married Commander Michael Edward St Quintin Wall, RN (1926–2017). Commander Wall had been Assistant Keeper of the Privy Purse.

Wall retired from Royal Communications in 1981. On her retirement she was appointed an Extra Woman of the Bedchamber to the Queen. From 2006, she was described as an Extra Lady-in-Waiting. Her duties included assisting with the large number of correspondence sent to Buckingham Palace in the aftermath of the death of Diana, Princess of Wales.

In recognition of her royal service, Wall was appointed a Member, Fourth Class (now known as Lieutenant) of the Royal Victorian Order (MVO) in the 1964 Birthday Honours and subsequently promoted to a Commander (CVO) and Dame Commander (DCVO) of the same order in the 1972 Birthday Honours and the 1982 New Year Honours, respectively.

Wall died on 28 October 2016, aged 88.
