= Jeffrey Cook (British Army officer) =

Brigadier Jeffrey Cook OBE MC
- Born: 1955 (age 70–71)
- Military career
- Allegiance: United Kingdom
- Branch: British Army
- Service years: 1974–2004
- Rank: Brigadier
- Service number: 498917
- Units: Staffordshire Regiment; Devonshire and Dorset Regiment; Special Air Service
- Commands: 20th Armoured Infantry Brigade
- Conflicts: The Troubles; Bosnian War
- Awards: Officer of the Order of the British Empire; Military Cross; Queen's Commendation for Valuable Service
- Other work: Director for Security Liaison (2004–2009)

Brigadier Jeffrey Robson Cook, OBE, MC (born 1955) is a retired British Army officer and a former Director for Security Liaison in the Royal Household of the Sovereign of the United Kingdom. He served in the Royal Household from 2004 to 2009, and is now Managing Director of the Morgan Aquila Group.

== Early life and military career ==
Cook was born in 1955. He entered the Royal Military Academy Sandhurst and, on graduation, was granted a short service commission as a second lieutenant in the Staffordshire Regiment on 9 November 1974. Promoted lieutenant on 9 November 1976 and captain on 2 December 1983, Cook trained as a parachutist and saw service in Northern Ireland during the Troubles and in the Balkans and elsewhere as an officer in E Squadron of the Special Air Service. He was granted a regular commission in 1984, and awarded the Military Cross in April 1985 "in recognition of gallant and distinguished service in Northern Ireland".

Promoted major on 30 September 1987, Cook was appointed a Member of the Order of the British Empire in April 1988 in recognition of further "distinguished service" in Northern Ireland. He transferred from the Staffordshire Regiment to the Devonshire and Dorset Regiment on 4 September 1990. Cook was promoted lieutenant colonel on 30 June 1994, and advanced to Officer of the Order of the British Empire in 1995 for his services in Northern Ireland between 1 October 1994 and 31 March 1995. He subsequently took part in NATO operations in Bosnia and Herzegovina in 1995 and was awarded a Queen's Commendation for Valuable Service. Promoted colonel on 30 June 1998 and brigadier on 31 December 1999 (with seniority from 30 June), Cook commanded the 20th Armoured Infantry Brigade from 1999 to 2001. He retired from the British Army on 1 June 2004.

== Director for Security Liaison ==
Following his retirement from the army, Cook was appointed the inaugural Director for Security Liaison. The position was a new addition to the Private Secretary's Office in the Royal Household of the Sovereign of the United Kingdom. The Private Secretary has general oversight of security, though the Master of the Household is also involved, and the Keeper of the Privy Purse has responsibility for the ceremonial bodyguards.
