= Royal Communications =

Position in the British Royal Household

Royal Communications is a branch of the Private Secretary's Office of the Royal Household of the Sovereign of the United Kingdom responsible for media relations and communicating with various organisations and authorities on matters to do with The King and the Royal Family. Until early 2014, Royal Communications was known as the Royal Household Press Office.

The head of Royal Communications is the Communications Secretary to the King and Queen. The post is currently held by Tobyn Andreae.

== Communications Secretaries ==
In 2014, the press offices of members of the Royal Family merged for a time at Buckingham Palace, though individual Communications Secretaries for members of the Royal Family were retained. Those members of the Royal Family who do not have their own Communications Secretaries are represented by that of the King and Queen.

The current Communications Secretaries within the Royal Household are:

- Tobyn Andreae (Communications Secretary to the King and Queen)
- Lee Thompson (Communications Secretary to the Prince and Princess of Wales)

Former Communications Secretaries:

- Donal McCabe

== Former Press Office positions ==
=== Director of Royal Communications (2014–2018) ===
• Sally Osman 2014–2018

=== The Queen's Media Secretary (2016–2018) ===
• Steve Kingstone 2016–2018

=== List of Communications & Press Secretary to The Queen ===
- James Roscoe 2013–2017
- Ailsa Anderson 2010–2013
- Samantha Cohen 2007–2010
- Penelope Russell-Smith2002–07

=== List of Deputy Press Secretary to The Queen ===
- Steve Kingstone 2013–2016
- James Roscoe 2012–2013
- Ed Perkins 2010–2012
- Ailsa Anderson 2007–2010
- Samantha Cohen 2003–2007
- Penelope Russell-Smith 1998–2002
- Geoffrey Crawford 1993–1997
- John Haslam 1988–1993

=== List of Communications Secretaries (1998–2002) ===
- Simon Walker 2000–2002
- Simon Lewis 1998–2000

=== List of Press Secretaries to the Sovereign (1918–2002) ===
- Penelope Russell-Smith 2000–2002
- Geoffrey Crawford 1997–2000
- Charles Anson 1990–1997
- Robin Janvrin 1987–1990
- Michael Shea 1978–1987
- Ronald Allison 1973–1978
- Robin Ludlow 1972–1973
- William Heseltine1968–1972
- Richard Colville 1947–1968
- Lewis Ritchie 1944–1947

vacant 1931–1944

- Sir Frank Mitchell 1920–1931
- Samuel Pryor 1918–1920

=== List of Assistant Press Secretaries to the Sovereign ===
- 1947–1957: Alexander Hood
- 1958–1981: Anne Hawkins (Wall from 1975)
- 1959–1960: Joseph Bennet Odunton
- 1965–1967: William Heseltine
- 1970–1974: Lawrence Bryant
- 1982–1987: Vic Chapman
- 1987-1988: Philip Mackie
- 1988-2000: Dickie Arbiter
