= List of honorary fellows of Magdalen College, Oxford =

Magdalen College, Oxford, like all Oxford colleges, may elect certain distinguished old members of the college, or benefactors and friends, as 'Honorary Fellows' as an honour and sign of respect or appreciation. This is a list of those so elected:

- Anatole Abragam
- Montek Singh Ahluwalia
- Richard Atkin, Baron Atkin
- Julian Barnes
- Stephen Breyer
- Peter Brook
- Nicolas Browne-Wilkinson, Baron Browne-Wilkinson
- Harry Christophers
- Sir David Clary
- Sir Cecil Clementi
- Sir John Eccles
- Bill Emmott
- Gareth Evans
- James Fenton
- Howard Florey, Baron Florey
- Malcolm Fraser
- Christopher Geidt, Baron Geidt
- A. D. Godley
- Keith Griffin
- William Hague, Baron Hague of Richmond
- Seamus Heaney
- John Hemming
- Sir Alan Hollinghurst
- Michael Jay, Baron Jay of Ewelme
- Dame Frances Kirwan
- Donald Knuth
- Harold Hongju Koh
- Sir Anthony Leggett
- C.S. Lewis
- Sir Kit McMahon
- Sir Peter Medawar
- Katie Mitchell
- J. H. C. Morris
- Helen Mountfield
- Kumi Naidoo
- Patrick Neill, Baron Neill of Bladen
- Sir Walter Parratt
- Sir Jonathan Porritt
- Sir Shridath Ramphal
- Matt Ridley, Viscount Ridley
- Anthony Smith
- David Souter
- Michael Spence
- Jonathan Sumption, Lord Sumption
- Strobe Talbott
- A.J.P. Taylor
- Sir Michael Wheeler-Booth
- Simon Woolley, Baron Woolley of Woodford
- John Zachary Young
