= Clive Alderton =

British diplomat and courtier (born 1967)

The Right Honourable Sir Clive Alderton KCVO
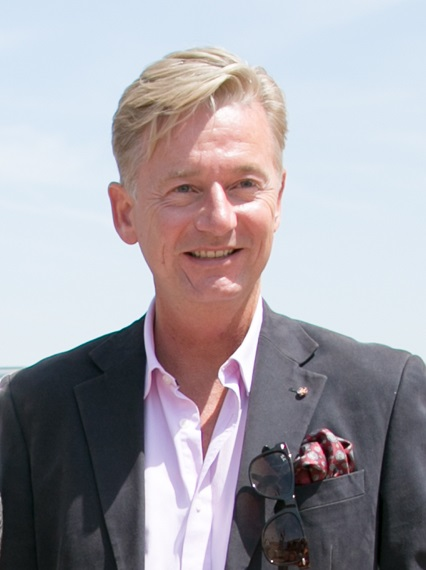
- Alderton in 2015

Private Secretary to the Sovereign
- Incumbent
- Assumed office 8 September 2022 Serving with Sir Edward Young (2022–2023)
- Monarch: Charles III
- Preceded by: Sir Edward Young

Principal Private Secretary to the Prince of Wales
- In office 5 February 2015 – 8 September 2022
- Monarch: Elizabeth II
- Preceded by: William Nye
- Succeeded by: Jean-Christophe Gray

Ambassador of the United Kingdom to Morocco and (non-resident) to Mauritania
- In office 2012 – 2015
- Preceded by: Timothy Morris
- Succeeded by: Karen Elizabeth Betts

Personal details
- Born: 9 May 1967 (age 59) United Kingdom
- Education: Abingdon School

Sir Clive Alderton KCVO (born 9 May 1967) is a British diplomat and courtier who has served as Private Secretary to King Charles III and Queen Camilla since 8 September 2022. As Private Secretary to the Sovereign, he is the senior operational member of the Royal Households of the United Kingdom. In this role, he took part in the 2023 Coronation. He is the 25th holder of the office of Private Secretary since its inception in 1805.

He previously served them in their capacity as Prince of Wales and Duchess of Cornwall, as their private secretary since 2015. He had previously worked in the Foreign Office, and had served as the British ambassador to Morocco from 2012 to 2015.

== Biography ==
Alderton was educated at Abingdon School. He joined the Foreign Office in 1986 and subsequently served in various diplomatic posts in Poland, Belgium (European Union), Singapore and France.

In 2006, he was appointed Deputy Private Secretary to Prince Charles and his wife Camilla, and he was promoted to Private Secretary for Foreign and Commonwealth Affairs to Their Royal Highnesses in 2009. In 2012, he took up an appointment as ambassador to Morocco and simultaneously non-resident ambassador to Mauritania.

He was appointed principal private secretary to the Prince of Wales and Duchess of Cornwall on 5 February 2015. He served in that position until the Prince's accession to the throne as King Charles III on 8 September 2022, following the death of his mother, Queen Elizabeth II.

On 13 September 2022, Alderton was sworn as a member of the Privy Council. On 20 October 2022, he attended the Privy Council as one of the King's Private Secretaries. He was Joint Private Secretary to the King, serving with Sir Edward Young, until 15 May 2023, when Young retired. From then he has been Private Secretary to the Sovereign.

Alderton is also a Trustee of the Prince of Wales's Charitable Fund.

According to the Sovereign Grant Report, as of 2026, Alderton receives total remuneration of £305,000.

In July 2026, it was announced that Alderton will retire in May 2027.

== Honours ==
Alderton was appointed Lieutenant of the Royal Victorian Order (LVO) in the 2013 New Year Honours, Commander of the Royal Victorian Order (CVO) in the 2019 Birthday Honours and Knight Commander of the Royal Victorian Order (KCVO) in the 2022 Birthday Honours. He is a recipient of the Queen Elizabeth II Diamond Jubilee Medal, the Queen Elizabeth II Platinum Jubilee Medal, and the King Charles III Coronation Medal.

In 2014, he was made a Knight of the Order of the Crown of Romania, a dynastic order of Romania. He was promoted to a Commander of the same order on 19 October 2023.

On 13 September 2022, he was sworn of His Majesty's Most Honourable Privy Council entitling him to the prefix "The Right Honourable" for life.

| Country | Date | Appointment | Ribbon | Post-nominal letters | Notes |
|---|---|---|---|---|---|
| United Kingdom | 6 February 2012 | Queen Elizabeth II Diamond Jubilee Medal | | | |
| United Kingdom | 28 December 2012 | Lieutenant of the Royal Victorian Order | | LVO | Promoted to CVO in 2019 |
| Royal House of Romania | 2014 | Knight Officer of the Order of the Crown of Romania | | | Promoted to Commander in 2023 |
| United Kingdom | 8 June 2019 | Commander of the Royal Victorian Order | | CVO | Promoted to KCVO in 2022 |
| United Kingdom | 6 February 2022 | Queen Elizabeth II Platinum Jubilee Medal | | | |
| United Kingdom | 1 June 2022 | Knight Commander of the Royal Victorian Order | | KCVO | |
| Germany | 29 March 2023 | Knight Commander's Cross of the Order of Merit | | | |
| United Kingdom | 6 May 2023 | King Charles III Coronation Medal | | | |
| Royal House of Romania | 19 October 2023 | Commander of the Order of the Crown of Romania | | | |
| Italy | 23 July 2025 | Knight Grand Cross of the Order of Merit of the Italian Republic | | | |
| France | | Commandeur of the Legion of Honour | | | |

Court offices
| Preceded by William Nye | Private Secretary to the Prince of Wales; 2015–2022 | Succeeded by Jean-Christophe Gray |
| Preceded by Sir Edward Young as Private Secretary to Queen Elizabeth II | Principal Private Secretary to the Sovereign; 2022–present | Incumbent |
Diplomatic posts
| Preceded by Timothy Morris | Ambassador to Morocco and (non-resident) to Mauritania; 2012–2015 | Succeeded by Karen Elizabeth Betts |
