= Martin Charteris, Baron Charteris of Amisfield =

British officer and courtier (1913–1999)

Lieutenant Colonel The Right Honourable The Lord Charteris of Amisfield GCB GCVO OBE QSO PC
- Charteris in 1962

Private Secretary to the Sovereign
- In office 1 April 1972 – 12 November 1977
- Monarch: Elizabeth II
- Deputy: Philip Moore
- Preceded by: Sir Michael Adeane
- Succeeded by: Philip Moore

Assistant Private Secretary to the Sovereign
- In office 6 February 1952 – 1 April 1972
- Monarch: Elizabeth II
- Private Secretary: Sir Alan Lascelles (until 1953); Sir Michael Adeane (from 1954)

Member of the House of Lords
- Lord Temporal
- Life peerage 7 February 1978 – 23 December 1999

Personal details
- Born: 7 September 1913 London, England
- Died: 23 December 1999 (aged 86) Cheltenham, Gloucestershire, England
- Spouse: The Hon. (Mary) Gay Hobart Margesson (m. 1944 - his death)
- Education: Royal Military College, Sandhurst
- Military career
- Branch: British Army
- Service years: 1933–1951
- Rank: Lieutenant-Colonel
- Unit: King's Royal Rifle Corps
- Conflicts: Second World War

Lieutenant-Colonel Martin Michael Charles Charteris, Baron Charteris of Amisfield, GCB, GCVO, OBE, QSO, PC (7 September 1913 – 23 December 1999) was a British Army officer and courtier of Queen Elizabeth II. Charteris was the longest-serving Assistant Private Secretary to the Sovereign, having served for over 18 years in that position. Later, he became Private Secretary to the Sovereign.

== Early life and education ==
Martin Michael Charles Charteris was born on 7 September 1913 in London, England. He was the second of two sons born to Hugo Francis Charteris, Lord Elcho (1884–1916), and Lady Violet Catherine Manners (died 1971). His paternal grandparents were the 11th Earl of Wemyss and Mary Constance Wyndham, and his maternal grandparents were the 8th Duke of Rutland and Violet Lindsay. His father, a barrister, was killed in action in Egypt in the First World War, and his mother remarried in 1922. His brother, David, succeeded as 12th Earl of Wemyss following the death of their grandfather in 1937.

He was educated at Lockers Park School in Hertfordshire, Eton and the Royal Military College, Sandhurst, and was commissioned in the King's Royal Rifle Corps. He fought in the Middle East during the Second World War, rising to the rank of lieutenant-colonel. On his return, he married the Hon. Mary Gay Hobart Margesson (a daughter of the 1st Viscount Margesson) on 16 December 1944 in Jerusalem and they had three children. He retired from the Army in 1951.

== Career ==
In 1950, he was appointed Private Secretary to Princess Elizabeth, who was then Duchess of Edinburgh and heir presumptive to the British throne. From her accession in 1952 until 1972, he served as her Assistant Private Secretary under Sir Michael Adeane. On Adeane's retirement in 1972, he was promoted to Private Secretary. He held this post until his retirement in 1977 and returned to Eton as its Provost. He was granted the honour of being a Permanent Lord in Waiting.

Charteris was noted for his outspoken interview, given to The Spectator in 1995, in which he described the Duchess of York as "vulgar", the then Prince of Wales (now Charles III) as "whiny", and the Queen Mother as "a bit of an ostrich", who "doesn't look at" what she "doesn't want to see".

== Honours ==
=== British honours ===
- Officer of the Order of the British Empire (Military Division) in the 1946 Birthday Honours
- Member of the Royal Victorian Order in the 1953 Coronation Honours
- Companion of the Order of the Bath in the 1958 Birthday Honours
- Knight Commander of the Royal Victorian Order in the 1962 Birthday Honours
- Knight Commander of the Order of the Bath in the 1972 Birthday Honours
- Knight Grand Cross of the Royal Victorian Order in the 1976 New Year Honours
- Knight Grand Cross of the Order of the Bath 11 August 1977
- Companion of the Queen's Service Order in the 1978 New Year Honours
- Created a life peer as Baron Charteris of Amisfield, of Amisfield in the District of East Lothian on 7 February 1978
- Recipient of the Royal Victorian Chain 7 July 1992

Coat of arms of Martin Charteris, Baron Charteris of Amisfield

Crest
A dexter hand issuant paleways holding between the thumb and forefinger in bend sinister a pair of sculptor's callipers all Proper.
Escutcheon
Quarterly: 1st and 4th Argent a fess Azure within a double tressure flory counterflory Gules (Charteris); 2nd and 3rd Or a lion rampant Gules armed and langued Azure (Wemyss); over all at the fess point a crescent Sable for difference.
Supporters
Dexter a scribe soberly attired holding in his exterior hand a quill pen Proper, sinister an Officer of the King's Royal Rifle Corps in the uniform worn circa 1904 Proper.
Motto
Ecce Charta Mea

=== Foreign honours ===
- Malaysia: Honorary Grand Commander of the Order of Loyalty to the Crown of Malaysia (1972)
- Austria: Grand Decoration of Honour in Silver for Services to the Republic of Austria in 1966

== Portrayals ==
In the first two seasons of the Netflix series The Crown, Charteris was portrayed by Harry Hadden-Paton. In seasons 3 and 4, the more mature Charteris was played by Charles Edwards. Charteris retired in 1977 as Private Secretary. In The Crown he was portrayed as holding the office much longer than in reality.

Court offices
Preceded by Sir Michael Adeane	Private Secretary to the Sovereign; 1972–1977	Succeeded by Sir Philip Moore
Academic offices
Preceded by The Lord Caccia	Provost of Eton; 1978–1991	Succeeded by Sir Antony Acland
