= Lord-in-waiting =

Peers who hold office in the Royal Household of the United Kingdom

Lords-in-waiting (male) or baronesses-in-waiting (female) are peers who hold office in the Royal Household of the sovereign of the United Kingdom. In the official Court Circular they are styled "Lord in Waiting" or "Baroness in Waiting" (without hyphenation).

There are two kinds of lord-in-waiting: political appointees by the government of the day who serve as junior government whips in the House of Lords (the senior whips have the positions of Captain of the Honourable Corps of Gentlemen-at-Arms and Captain of the Yeomen of the Guard); and non-political appointments by the monarch (who, if they have a seat in the House of Lords, sit as crossbenchers). Lords-in-waiting (whether political or non-political) may be called upon periodically to represent the sovereign; for example, one of their number is regularly called upon to greet visiting heads of state on arrival at an airport at the start of a state or official visit, and they may then play a role in accompanying them for the duration of their stay (for instance, on 3 June 2019 lord-in-waiting Alan Brooke, 3rd Viscount Brookeborough was in attendance at London Stansted Airport to welcome U.S. President Donald Trump and First Lady Melania Trump on behalf of the Queen; he and Viscountess Brookeborough then remained "specially attached" to the Trumps for the duration of their visit). They are also occasionally in attendance on other state or royal occasions. "Extra" lords-in-waiting may also be appointed, supernumerary to the regular appointees, who fulfil a similar role; for example, Baroness Rawlings, whose appointment as a government whip (and baroness-in-waiting) ceased in 2012, continued to serve as an extra baroness-in-waiting, and represented the Queen on certain occasions (for example on 27 February 2019 she was present at RAF Northolt to welcome the King Abdullah II and Queen Rania of Jordan, while at the same time another baroness-in-waiting, Baroness Manzoor, was present at Heathrow Airport to welcome Borut Pahor, president of Slovenia).

In addition, the honour of serving as a permanent lord-in-waiting is occasionally bestowed on very senior courtiers following their retirement. A permanent lord-in-waiting may also represent the sovereign, as often happens at funerals or memorial services for former courtiers.

== Political appointments ==
Most baronesses and lords-in-waiting serve as government whips in the House of Lords. Being members of the government, they are appointed by the sovereign on the recommendation of the Prime Minister and invariably relinquish their position when there is a change of government.

Those currently serving in this capacity are:

Portfolio	Name	Start
Lord-in-waiting	Mike Katz, Baron Katz	11 April 2025
Lord-in-waiting	Phil Wilson, Baron Wilson of Sedgefield	10 February 2025
Baroness-in-waiting	Sophy Antrobus, Baroness Antrobus	21 July 2026
Baroness-in-waiting	Judith Blake, Baroness Blake of Leeds	11 July 2024
Baroness-in-waiting	Margaret Curran, Baroness Curran	12 June 2026
Baroness-in-waiting	Brenda Dacres, Baroness Dacres of Lewisham	21 July 2026
Baroness-in-waiting	Sara Hyde, Baroness Hyde of Bemerton	21 July 2026
Baroness-in-waiting	Jane Ramsey, Baroness Ramsey of Wall Heath	12 June 2026

== Non-political appointments ==
Alongside the political appointees two non-political lords-in-waiting are always appointed, at the personal discretion of the sovereign (distinguished from their political counterparts by the designation 'Personal Lord in Waiting').

Those currently serving in this capacity are:

Portfolio	Name	Start
Personal lord-in-waiting	Alan Brooke, 3rd Viscount Brookeborough	1 May 1997
Personal lord-in-waiting	Henry Hood, 8th Viscount Hood	30 July 2008

== Additional appointments ==
Any additional appointees are termed extra lords or baronesses-in-waiting.

Those currently serving in this capacity are:

Portfolio	Name	Start
Extra baroness-in-waiting	Patricia Rawlings, Baroness Rawlings	2012
Extra lord-in-waiting	Anthony St John, 22nd Baron St John of Bletso	19 March 1998

== Permanent lords-in-waiting ==
Permanent lords-in-waiting are retired senior officials of the Royal Household. Those serving in this capacity are:

Name	Start
Former Lord Great Chamberlain of England
David Cholmondeley, 7th Marquess of Cholmondeley	17 March 2023
Former Lord Chamberlains of the Household
Richard Luce, Baron Luce	16 July 2007
William Peel, 3rd Earl Peel	1 April 2021
Former Private Secretaries to the Sovereign
Christopher Geidt, Baron Geidt	4 March 2019
Robin Janvrin, Baron Janvrin	13 November 2007
Edward Young, Baron Young of Old Windsor	15 May 2023
