= Director for Security Liaison =

An office created in the Private Secretary's Office of the Royal Household of the Sovereign of the United Kingdom in 2004 after a Daily Mirror reporter (Ryan Parry) used a false CV to obtain a job at Buckingham Palace. A subsequent government report recommended the establishment of the Director of Security Liaison role. The first office-holder was Brigadier Jeffrey Cook, a former Special Air Service (SAS) officer. He served until 2008. John Lynes CVO, another military officer, was the Director from around 2015 to 2023. The current Director of Security Liaison is Stuart Reynolds, a senior government security official with a background in national security, appointed in 2023.

The whole range of security services for the Sovereign are within the Director's responsibility.

Non-combat personal bodyguards include the Gentlemen at Arms, the Yeomen of the Guard, the Royal Company of Archers (in Scotland), the Honourable Artillery Company (in the City of London), the Corps of Serjeants at Arms, the High Constables and Guard of Honour of the Palace of Holyroodhouse (in Scotland), and the Wardens of the Jewel House, Tower of London. The Gold Stick and Silver Stick, senior officers of the Household Cavalry, also have a role, to protect the person of the Sovereign and to pass on any orders to their respective regiments.

Military guards for the Sovereign and metropolis comprise foot guards, mounted guards, and saluting batteries. The Household Division consists of five regiments of Foot Guards (five battalions), and the Household Cavalry. This latter has one armoured reconnaissance regiment and a mounted cavalry regiment provided by the two combined regiments.

The Household Division provides several battalions at any one time tasked for public duties, which include the protection of the Sovereign. In the Second World War a special unit, known as the Coats Mission, was entrusted with facilitating the Sovereign's evacuation in the event that this were necessary.

The Director for Security Liaison is the principal point of contact for all security matters across the Royal Household. He is responsible for the co-ordination and implementation of Royal Household security plans, policies and procedures. He works with the police, Home Office, and other agencies within the existing framework of security responsibilities. The Director reports to the Private Secretary to the Sovereign. A security plan for Royal Household security is to be written in consultation with police and other security organisations, covering personnel security as well as protection and physical security, and this is subject to annual reviews.
