= Geoffrey Hawkins =

Royal Navy Admiral (1895–1980)

Admiral Sir Geoffrey Hawkins KBE CB MVO DSC
- Born: 13 July 1895
- Died: 5 October 1980 (aged 85)
- Spouse: Lady Margaret Montagu Douglas Scott (m. 1926; died 1976)
- Children: 3; including Anne
- Military career
- Allegiance: United Kingdom
- Branch: Royal Navy
- Rank: Admiral
- Commands: HMS Queen of Bermuda; HMS Kent; Malta Dockyard
- Conflicts: World War I World War II
- Awards: Knight Commander of the Order of the British Empire; Companion of the Order of the Bath; Member of the Royal Victorian Order; Distinguished Service Cross

Admiral Sir Geoffrey Alan Brooke Hawkins KBE CB MVO DSC (13 July 1895 – 5 October 1980) was a Royal Navy officer who became Flag Officer, Malta.

== Naval career ==
Hawkins was promoted to midshipman on 15 January 1913 and served in the First World War. He also served in the Second World War becoming commanding officer of the armed merchant cruiser HMS Queen of Bermuda in December 1939, Chief Staff Officer, Gibraltar in June 1941 and commanding officer of the cruiser HMS Kent in July 1943. He went on to be Commodore, Royal Naval Barracks, Portsmouth in May 1945, Vice-Controller of the Navy in June 1947 and Flag Officer, Malta in July 1950.

== Marriage and family ==
He married Lady Margaret Ida Montagu Douglas Scott on 16 February 1926. Lady Margaret (known as Mida among family) was the eldest daughter of the 7th Duke of Buccleuch. Her younger sister was Princess Alice, Duchess of Gloucester. She was a lady-in-waiting to Princess Alice, Countess of Athlone, at the time of her marriage, and as the Earl and Countess of Athlone were living in Cape Town, the Earl being Governor General of South Africa, the marriage between Lady Margaret and Commander Hawkins took place in a newly built cathedral in Cape Town. The bride's maternal uncle, Colonel Harry Bridgeman, gave her away and young Lady Alice (future Duchess of Gloucester) attended the wedding and was a guest of the newlyweds for a while.

The marriage produced three children:

- (Alice) Anne Hawkins (31 March 1928 – 28 October 2016); she married Commander Michael Edward St. Quintin Wall (25 August 1926 – 5 October 2017) on 27 June 1975.
- Renira Margaret Ida Hawkins (born 29 September 1930); she married Alistair Allan Horne (9 November 1925 – 25 May 2017) on 28 November 1953 (their marriage was dissolved), and had three daughters.
- James Walter Hawkins (16 March 1933 - 4 January 2021); never married.

Military offices
Preceded by Philip Clarke	Flag Officer, Malta; 1950–1952	Succeeded by Jocelyn Salter
