= Christopher Geidt, Baron Geidt =

Private Secretary to Queen Elizabeth II (born 1961)

The Right Honourable The Lord Geidt GCB GCVO OBE QSO PC FKC
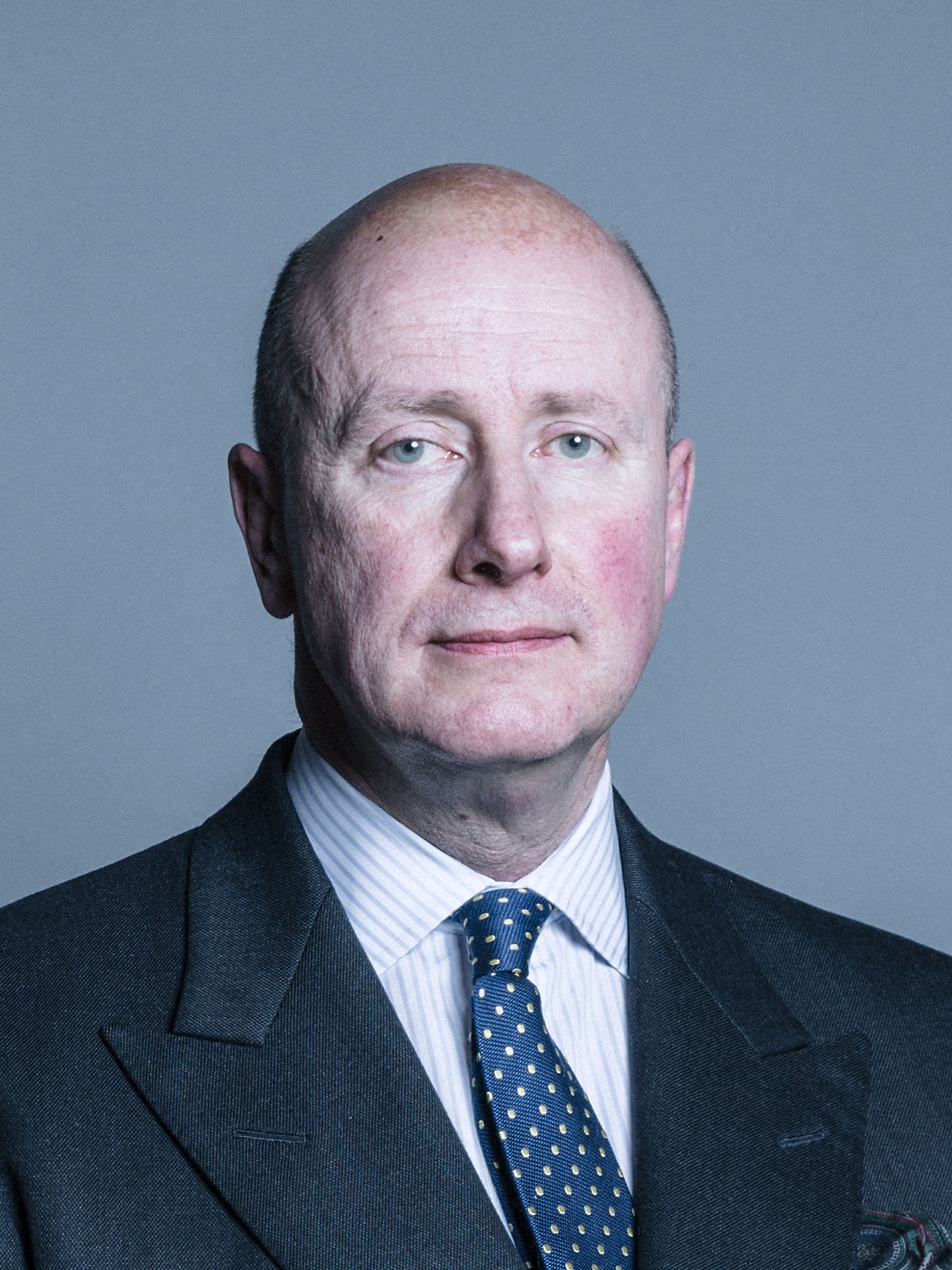
- Official portrait, 2018

Private Secretary to the Sovereign
- In office 8 September 2007 – 17 October 2017
- Monarch: Elizabeth II
- Deputy: Edward Young
- Preceded by: Sir Robin Janvrin
- Succeeded by: Sir Edward Young

Deputy Private Secretary to the Sovereign
- In office 2005–2007
- Monarch: Elizabeth II
- Secretary: Sir Robin Janvrin
- Preceded by: Mary Francis
- Succeeded by: Edward Young

Member of the House of Lords
- Lord Temporal
- Life peerage 3 November 2017

Personal details
- Born: 17 August 1961 (age 65) Marylebone, London, England
- Party: None (crossbencher)
- Spouse: Emma Neill (m. 1996)
- Children: 2
- Education: Dragon School; Glenalmond College; King's College London; Trinity Hall, Cambridge

Christopher Edward Wollaston MacKenzie Geidt, Baron Geidt, GCB, GCVO, OBE, QSO, PC, FKC (born 17 August 1961) is a member of the House of Lords, former Courtier to the British monarch, former army intelligence officer and diplomat, and former adviser to the prime minister on ministerial ethics. As Sir Christopher Geidt, he served as Private Secretary to Queen Elizabeth II from 2007 to 2017 (serving as deputy for two years from 2005). He was created Baron Geidt in 2017.

Between 28 April 2021 and 15 June 2022 he was the Independent Adviser on Ministers' Interests to Prime Minister Boris Johnson; he resigned in protest following a series of conflagrations over the spending of public and private funds and trade policy.

== Early life and education ==
Born in Marylebone, London, son of magistrates' court chief clerk Mervyn Bernard Geidt (1926–1991) and Diana Cecil MacKenzie (1928–2012), Geidt grew up on the Isle of Lewis in the Outer Hebrides. Geidt attended the Dragon School in Oxford and Glenalmond College in Perth and Kinross. He graduated in War Studies from King's College London, and in International Relations from Trinity Hall, Cambridge. He is a Fellow of King's College London (FKC), an Honorary Fellow of Magdalen College, Oxford, and an Honorary Bencher of Middle Temple.

== Career ==
=== British Army ===
An Army Scholar, Geidt enlisted in the Scots Guards and attended the Royal Military Academy Sandhurst from 1982 to 1983; he did not pass out and receive a commission as he was invalided from the army. He was later commissioned in the Intelligence Corps, serving in the British Army from 1987 to 1994.

In 1987, Geidt joined the staff of the Royal United Services Institute for Defence Studies, becoming an Assistant Director. From 1994 he worked for the Foreign and Commonwealth Office in diplomatic posts in Sarajevo, Geneva and Brussels.

In 1991, Geidt and Anthony de Normann sued the journalist John Pilger and Central Television over the documentary Cambodia: The Betrayal, in which they were accused of being members of the SAS secretly engaged in the training of the Khmer Rouge of Cambodia. Geidt and de Normann accepted "very substantial" damages and all costs. In a related libel action Ann Clwyd MP, then shadow minister for overseas development, issued a public apology to Geidt and de Normann and agreed to meet all legal costs.

During and after the war in Bosnia (1992–1995), Geidt was deployed to liaise with the Bosnian Serb leadership, including Radovan Karadžić, Momčilo Krajišnik and General Ratko Mladić, all later indicted for war crimes. He assisted the High Representative, Carl Bildt, in negotiating with Serbian President Slobodan Milošević for the removal of Karadžić from the presidency of Republika Srpska in 1996.

Geidt is the Honorary Regimental Colonel of the London Scottish Regiment, having succeeded George, Lord Robertson of Port Ellen in 2016. He was appointed Honorary Colonel 1st Battalion The Highlanders Army Cadet Force on 1 December 2024.

=== Private Secretary to Queen Elizabeth II ===
Geidt was recruited to the Royal Household in 2002 as Assistant Private Secretary to the Queen. He was promoted to Deputy Private Secretary in 2005. He then served as the Queen's Private Secretary from 2007 to 2017.

During his time as Private Secretary, Geidt was also Keeper of the Royal Archives and a Trustee of the Royal Collection and of the Queen's Silver Jubilee Trust (later the Queen's Trust). He remains a Trustee of the Queen Elizabeth Diamond Jubilee Trust and is also Chairman of the Queen's Commonwealth Trust.

As Private Secretary, Geidt was a member of the so-called 'golden triangle' of senior British officials – the others being the Cabinet Secretary and the Principal Private Secretary to the Prime Minister – with key responsibilities in the event of a hung parliament in the United Kingdom, as happened in 2010.

After ten years as Private Secretary, Geidt stepped down in October 2017 and was succeeded by Sir Edward Young. He was subsequently created Baron Geidt, of Crobeg in the County of Ross and Cromarty, and sits as a Crossbench peer in the House of Lords. In early March 2019, he was appointed a Permanent Lord-in-waiting.

=== Oman, BAE Systems, Schroders, King's College London ===
Geidt became chair of the Council of King's College London in 2016, took an advisory role in the arms, security and aerospace company BAE Systems until April 2021, and serves as chair of a board in the asset management company Schroders. According to the diaries of Sir Alan Duncan, Geidt worked for the Sultan of Oman. In November 2021, academic staff at King’s College London wrote publicly complaining that Geidt had failed to disclose and manage conflicts of interest, breaching university policy. This included failure to state in the register of interests that he had been working for the Sultan of Oman, or manage conflicts with BAE Systems and Schroders, as the university had investments in BAE Systems up to 2020 and in Schroders, and had ‘multiple partnerships’ with Oman state bodies in medical care and dentistry.

=== Adviser on Ministers' Interests ===
On 28 April 2021, it was announced that Prime Minister Boris Johnson had appointed Geidt as the Independent Adviser on Ministers' Interests.

On 28 May 2021, Geidt published a report on allegations surrounding the financing of refurbishments made to 11 Downing Street. The report concluded that Johnson did not breach the Ministerial Code and that no conflict of interest, or reasonably perceived conflict of interest, arose. However, Geidt expressed that it was "unwise" for Johnson to have proceeded with refurbishments without "more rigorous regard for how this would be funded". The Conservative Party was fined £17,800 for improperly declaring this donation. Shadow First Secretary of State Angela Rayner called on Lord Geidt to reopen his investigation into funding of the refurbishment, and the Liberal Democrats have called for an independent public inquiry.

In December 2021 it was reported that Geidt was considering resigning his role as standards adviser for Johnson.

In his annual report of May 2022, Geidt said that he had avoided offering unprompted advice to Boris Johnson about the latter's obligations under his own ministerial code because if it had been rejected, he would have had to resign.

On 14 June 2022, Geidt appeared at a Parliamentary committee, and was widely criticised. On 15 June 2022, Geidt resigned from the role. The Scotsman said the reason for his resignation was that he was "tasked to offer a view about the Government's intention to consider measures which risk a deliberate and purposeful breach of the Ministerial Code". The Daily Telegraph said he "had finally resigned over a row with the Prime Minister over trade policy". BBC News said the resignation was due to a request for advice on a trade issue that had left him with no choice but to quit. Geidt maintained he was asked to advise on an issue he believed would be a deliberate breach of the ministerial code. Geidt wrote "This request has placed me in an impossible and odious position," he wrote the concept that the prime minister, "might to any degree be in the business of deliberately breaching his own code is an affront" that would amount to suspending the code "to suit a political end. This would make a mockery not only of respect for the code but licence the suspension of its provisions in governing the conduct of Her Majesty's ministers. I can have no part in this."

On 17 June 2022 a second letter appeared about Geidt's resignation. Geidt said he resigned due to the government's "openness" to breaking international law. Geidt was the second ethics adviser to resign under Johnson; Sir Alex Allan resigned in 2020.

== Family and personal life ==
In 1996, Geidt married Emma Charlotte Angela Neill, younger daughter of Patrick Neill, Baron Neill of Bladen. The couple have two daughters.

He currently lives and farms on the Isle of Lewis, in the Outer Hebrides.

== Honours and awards ==
Geidt was appointed a Privy Counsellor (PC) in 2007. He was promoted to a Life Peerage to be Baron Geidt, of Crobeg in the County of Ross and Cromarty on 3 November 2017.

Knight Grand Cross of the Order of the Bath (GCB)	2018 New Year Honours
Knight Commander of the Order of the Bath (KCB)	2014 New Year Honours
Knight Grand Cross of the Royal Victorian Order (GCVO)	5 October 2017
Knight Commander of the Royal Victorian Order (KCVO)	2011 Birthday Honours
Commander of the Royal Victorian Order (CVO)	2007 Birthday Honours
Officer of the Order of the British Empire (OBE)	1997 Birthday Honours
Companion of the Queen's Service Order (QSO)	2018 New Year Honours (New Zealand)
Gulf Medal	with one clasp
United Nations Medal (United Nations)	United Nations Transitional Authority in Cambodia (UNTAC)
United Nations Medal (United Nations)	United Nations Protection Force (UNPROFOR)
European Community Monitor Mission Medal (European Union)	'for service in the former Yugoslavia'
Queen Elizabeth II Diamond Jubilee Medal	2012
Grand Officer of the Legion of Honour (France)	2014
Officer of the Legion of Honour (France)	2004

Court offices
Preceded by Sir Robin Janvrin	Private Secretary to the Sovereign; 2007–2017	Succeeded by Sir Edward Young
Academic offices
Preceded by The Duke of Wellington	Chairman of King's College London; 2016–2025	Followed by Lord Stevens
Orders of precedence in the United Kingdom
Preceded by The Lord Agnew of Oulton	Gentlemen; Baron Geidt	Followed by The Lord Hogan-Howe
