= List of ambassadors of the United Kingdom to Mauritania =

His Britannic Majesty's Ambassador to the Islamic Republic of Mauritania
- British diplomatic flag
- Incumbent; Guy Harrison since January 2025
- Style: His Excellency
- Appointer: King Charles III
- Website: Mauritania and the UK

The ambassador of the United Kingdom to Mauritania is the United Kingdom's foremost diplomatic representative in the Islamic Republic of Mauritania.

Mauritania became an independent state in 1960, but the United Kingdom did not have a resident ambassador until 2018: the British ambassador to Senegal was also non-resident ambassador to Mauritania from 1960 to 1990, and the ambassador to Morocco was non-resident ambassador to Mauritania from 1990 to 2018. In 2018 the United Kingdom upgraded its office in Nouakchott to an embassy and appointed a resident ambassador.

== Ambassadors ==
- 1960–1990, see List of ambassadors of the United Kingdom to Senegal.
- 1990–2018, see List of ambassadors of the United Kingdom to Morocco.
- 2018–2019: Samuel Thomas
- 2019–2021: Simon Boyden
- 2021–2025: Colin Wells
- 2025–present: Guy Harrison
