= William Heseltine =

Australian civil servant (1930–2026)

The Right Honourable Sir William Heseltine GCB GCVO AC QSO

Private Secretary to the Sovereign
- In office 1 April 1986 – 19 October 1990
- Monarch: Elizabeth II
- Deputy: Sir Robert Fellowes
- Preceded by: Sir Philip Moore
- Succeeded by: Sir Robert Fellowes

Acting Secretary to the Governor-General of Australia
- In office May 1962 – August 1962
- Monarch: Elizabeth II
- Governor General: The Viscount De L'Isle
- Preceded by: Sir Murray Tyrrell
- Succeeded by: Sir Murray Tyrrell

Personal details
- Born: William Frederick Payne Heseltine; 17 July 1930 Fremantle, Western Australia, Australia
- Died: 2 October 2026 (aged 96)
- Spouse(s): Ann Turner (died 1957) Audrey Nolan (died 2013) Diana Loftus (m. 2016)
- Children: 2
- Education: University of Western Australia

Sir William Frederick Payne Heseltine GCB GCVO AC QSO (17 July 1930 – 2 October 2026) was an Australian civil servant who was the Private Secretary to Queen Elizabeth II from 1986 to 1990.

== Life and career ==
Heseltine was born in Fremantle, Western Australia on 17 July 1930, the eldest son of Henry Heseltine and Louise (née Payne), both teachers. He spent some of his childhood in Wyalkatchem, Western Australia. He was educated at Richmond Primary School, Christ Church Grammar School, Claremont, Western Australia, and the University of Western Australia, where he received a 1st class BA (Hons) in history. Heseltine joined the Prime Minister's Department (Australia) in 1951, where he remained until 1962. He was Private Secretary to Prime Minister Sir Robert Menzies from 1955 to 1959, Acting Assistant Press Secretary to the Queen from 1960 to 1961, and Acting Official Secretary to the Governor-General of Australia, The 1st Viscount De L'Isle, from May to August 1962.

From 1962 to 1964, Heseltine was Assistant Federal Director of the Liberal Party of Australia, and in 1964 was attached to The Age (Melbourne). In the same year, he was attached to Princess Marina for her tour of Australia. Heseltine joined the Press Office of The Royal Household as Assistant Press Secretary to the Queen and served in that position from 1965 to 1967. He was Press Secretary from 1968 to 1972.

In 1972, Heseltine was moved to the Private Secretary's Office proper, becoming Assistant Private Secretary. In November 1977, he was promoted to Deputy Private Secretary and, in April 1986, to Private Secretary to the Sovereign, and Keeper of the Queen's Archives. He retired in October 1990.

On 20 November 1979, he was appointed an Extra Equerry while Deputy Private Secretary to the Queen. He later worked as a company director, including as chairman of NZI Insurance Australia Ltd in 1992 (deputy 1991–1992); as director of NZI Insurance New Zealand in 1996; P&O Australia Ltd from 1990; and West Coast Telecasters Ltd from 1991 to 1996.

He had three wives, Ann Turner who died in 1957, Audrey Nolan who died in 2013 and Diana Loftus whom he married in 2016. He had two children with Nolan, John and Sophy.

Upon leaving royal service, Heseltine retired to his native Western Australia. He died on 2 October 2026, at the age of 96.

== Appointments ==
- Privy Counsellor, 1986
- Honorary Doctorate, Murdoch University, 1992

== Honours ==
Knight Grand Cross of the Order of the Bath (GCB)	1990
Knight Commander of the Order of the Bath (KCB)	1986
Companion of the Order of the Bath (CB)	1978
Knight Grand Cross of the Royal Victorian Order (GCVO)	1990
Knight Commander of the Royal Victorian Order (KCVO)	1982
Commander of the Royal Victorian Order (CVO)	1969
Member of the Royal Victorian Order (MVO)	1961
Companion of the Order of Australia (AC)	1988
Companion of the Queen's Service Order (QSO)	6 February 1990 (New Zealand)
Queen Elizabeth II Silver Jubilee Medal	1977
New Zealand 1990 Commemoration Medal	1990 (New Zealand)
Centenary Medal	2001
Royal Household Long and Faithful Service Medal	1985 (Queen Elizabeth II Version)
Grand Decoration of Honour in Silver for Services to the Republic of Austria	1969 (Austria)

Court offices
Preceded by Sir Philip Moore	Private Secretary to the Sovereign; 1986–1990	Succeeded by Lord Fellowes
