= Royal Archives =

Division of the Royal Household of the United Kingdom

Coordinates: 51.501°N 0.142°W

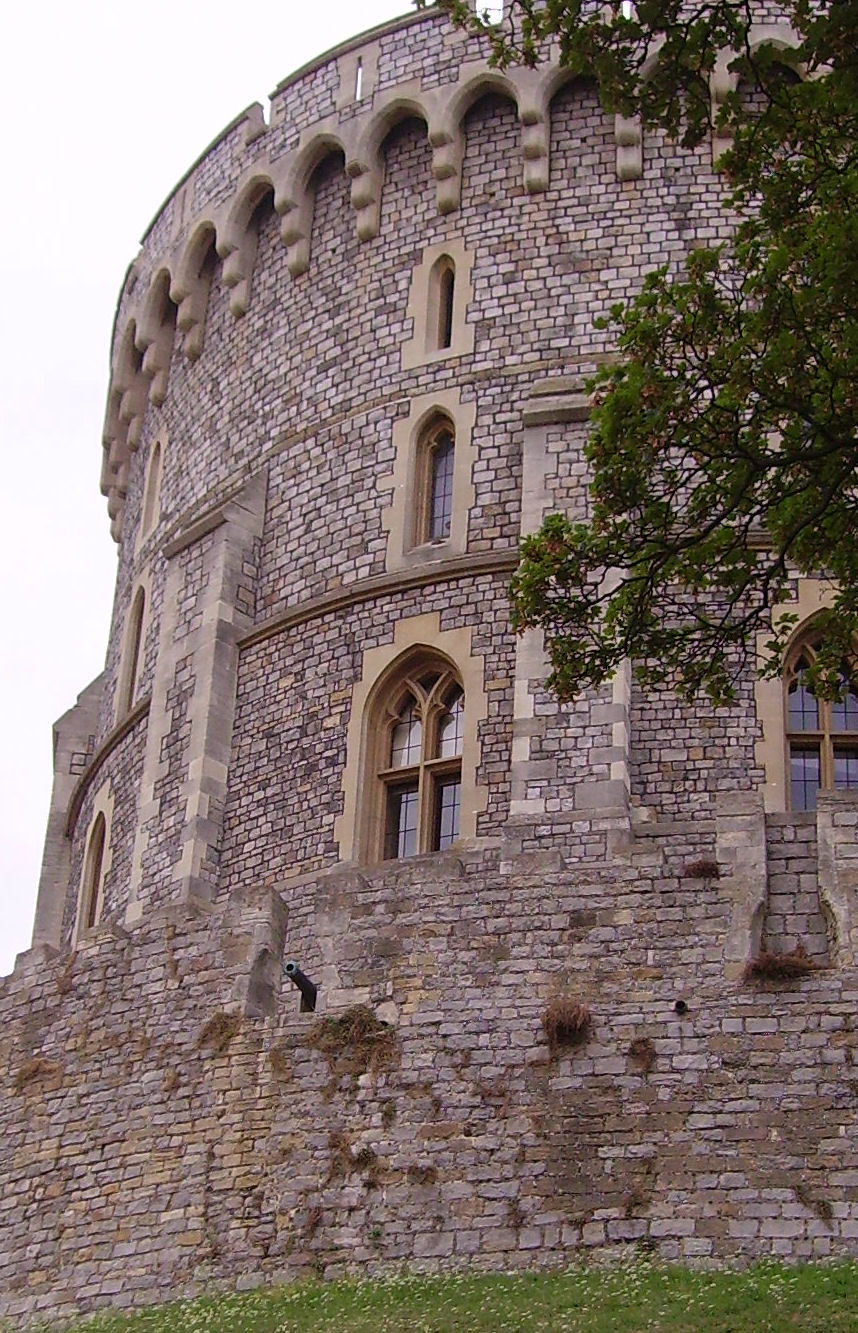
The Round Tower of Windsor Castle

The Royal Archives, also known as the King's or Queen's Archives, is a division of the Royal Household of the Sovereign of the United Kingdom. It is operationally under the control of the Keeper of the Royal Archives, who is customarily the Private Secretary to the Sovereign. Although sovereigns have kept records for centuries, the Royal Archives was formally established as recently as 1912 and occupies part of the Round Tower of Windsor Castle.

Since the Royal Archives are privately owned, requests for public access must be approved based on the needs and qualifications of the researcher. The restrictions on access to the archives have attracted criticism from historians and academics and accusations of censorship.

== History ==
Following Queen Victoria's death in 1901, an appointment for Keeper of the Royal Archives was made by Edward VII to safeguard the Queen's "collection of official and private correspondence". At the behest of George V, this archive along with other royal collections were relocated for storage and display within the Round Tower of Windsor Castle in 1914. Through the attainment of additional records and collections through various means of acquisition, the Royal Archives gradually increased in scale. The tower's renovation and subsequent expansion decades later successfully addressed spatial constraints and provided more effective methods of archival preservation.

== Stewardship ==
The King's Archives is the responsibility of the Assistant Keeper of the King's Archives (also the Royal Librarian), and professional staff under the Archives Services Manager who is in charge of the day-to-day work in the archives. There are several qualified Archivists, as well as a small clerical staff. In addition to paid staff, volunteers are crucial in maintaining collections, developing exhibitions, and facilitating research. Benefiting from the use of the Collections Management System, CALM, Royal Archives staff ensure that collections in the royal archives are efficiently catalogued and made accessible digitally.

Sir John Wheeler-Bennett was Historical Adviser to the Queen's Archives from 1959 to 1975.

== Collections ==
Comprising collections including diaries, letters, household papers. and administrative records, the Royal Archives retain significant personal and official information about the British monarchy (also Monarchy of the United Kingdom). The Royal Photograph Collection also occupies part of the Round Tower and holds over 400 000 items of photographic material from the Royal Collection. The Royal Photograph Collection is managed separately from the Royal Archives and is the responsibility of the Head Curator of the Photograph Collection, who reports to the Director of the Royal Collection.

Twentieth century royals including Edward VII, George V, Edward VIII, and George VI are well represented in the Royal Archives. Documents ranging from private correspondence to official government papers illustrate public engagement and diplomacy. Recent files and those currently in use are retained at Buckingham Palace.

In commemoration of the Royal Archives’ foundation, “Treasures from the Royal Archives” was published in 2014 and highlighted several noteworthy collections such as the Georgian Papers and the Letters of Queen Victoria.

=== Wardrobe, Household, and Estate Papers ===
Presented to George V in 1914 by John Montagu Douglas Scott, 7th Duke of Buccleuch was a collection of papers including bills and receipts detailing the purchases of royal furnishings and wardrobes. Currently the oldest records in the Royal Archives, the Wardrobe Papers originated from the Dukes of Montagu between 1660 and 1749. Records of the Royal Household including staff records are also stored at the Royal Archives for safekeeping and made available online for public research. These papers detail financial and managerial information of various royal estates during the eighteenth, nineteenth, and twentieth centuries.

=== Stuart and Cumberland Papers ===
Following the death of Henry Benedict Stuart, papers and letters belonging to the Stuart lineage were acquired by George IV after eventually relocating from Rome to the Royal Archives through a complex set of circumstances. One of the first and oldest collections housed in the Royal Archives, the Stuart Papers are composed of letters, records, and other papers illustrating the Jacobite conflict between 1713 and 1770. Obtained around the same time as the Stuart Papers, records of Prince William, Duke of Cumberland were transferred to the Royal Archives in 1914. Significant moments in the Jacobite Rebellion from 1745 to 1757 were documented in military records and correspondence.

=== Georgian Papers ===
In partnership with the Royal Library, the Omohundro Institute of Early American History and Culture, and the College of William & Mary, the Royal Archives are systematically cataloging the Georgian Papers, which will be made digitally accessible and searchable to users all over the world. As part of the Georgian Papers Programme, the Royal Archives plans to catalogue all its papers relating to the Hanoverian monarchy and make them freely available online by 2020.

Introduced to the Royal Archives in 1914, both official and private correspondence of George III and George IV were found in the care of Arthur Wellesley, 4th Duke of Wellington who presented them to George V upon discovery. Although a small amount of the Georgian Papers includes records from George I and George II, most of the collection represents George III and George IV. This collection also includes a sample of essays and other personal writings of George III. Additionally, despite William IV's official papers being destroyed after his death in 1837, records including personal accounts, military documents, and private correspondence have been preserved in the Royal Archives. As acting prime ministers under the reign of William IV and Queen Victoria, Charles Grey, 2nd Earl Grey and William Lamb, 2nd Viscount Melbourne, produced a wealth of official correspondence during their time in service. Known as the Melbourne and Howick Papers, these documents detail noteworthy political and social affairs of the 1830s.

=== Queen Victoria's Papers ===
Contributing to the documentation of Queen Victoria’s reign, Reginald Brett, 2nd Viscount Esher edited both private and official correspondence, which was later published and retained in the Royal Archives. The Queen's youngest daughter Princess Beatrice took on the responsibility of editing and transcribing her mother's personal journals. In 2012 the Archives successfully completed a project to scan Queen Victoria's journals and make them available online as a special project for the diamond jubilee of Victoria's great-great-granddaughter, Queen Elizabeth II. Access to this online archive is freely available in the UK but restricted to academic institutions and libraries abroad.

Unlike his mother, Queen Victoria, Edward VII ordered the destruction of most of his personal correspondence upon his death in 1910. Fortunately, the official records from his reign endured and are stored in the Royal Archives. The King's consort, Queen Alexandra, ordered that her papers be disposed of as well, however a collection of letters to and from her son, George V, have been maintained. Additionally, military papers belonging to Prince George, Duke of Cambridge were initially acquired by Queen Mary and are of great historical value at the Royal Archives.

== Criticism of restricted access ==
In January 2017 Alistair Cooke, Baron Lexden expressed his concern in a letter to The Times regarding the accessibility of the Royal Archives. Cooke wrote that "Favoured authors likely to deal indulgently with royal reputations can expect to be treated with great kindness by the archivists at Windsor. For the rest of us it is often a different story" and wrote that he had been refused access to Queen Victoria's journals when researching the Home Rule Crisis of 1886. Cooke felt that "The public has access to them on terms that are the same for everyone. We must have clear, objective criteria for access to the Royal Archives without any attempt to censor publication of material that illuminates history". Cooke echoed his position in a further letter in March 2017.

Julia Baird was asked by Pamela Clarke, the assistant keeper of the Royal Archives, to excise from her book an account of a "flirtatious exchange" between Victoria and John Brown that she had found recorded in the private papers of Sir James Reid. Reid's papers were held by his descendants and are not part of the Royal Archives. Baird recalled that she was asked to remove "large sections of my book based on material that I had found not inside but outside the archives". Baird subsequently wrote an opinion piece for The New York Times in 2016 on the incident, concluding that "By rationing access and suppressing evidence, the Royal Archives have accomplished the very reverse of their intention. In the absence of the full historical truth about the British monarchy, sensationalism, suspicion and spin have reigned for too long".

Mark Bostridge said that he was aware of "half a dozen historians" who had also experienced censorship by the Royal Archives. Bostridge wrote in The Times Literary Supplement in 2006 that "For years writers and scholars have complained under their breath about unwarranted censorship of their work" by the Royal Archives but "generally they have been loathe[sic] to publicise their treatment for fear they wouldn't be permitted to research at Windsor again".

Lucinda Hawksley was told by the Royal Archives that their files on Princess Louise, Duchess of Argyll were closed to her.

In 2022 Index on Censorship published a report on the secrecy of royal files as part of a campaign to widen access to the Royal Archives.

Historian Karina Urbach in a blogpost for the School of Advanced Study wrote that she has been trying to interest people "in the fact that the royal archives were hindering serious historical research on the 20th century" for "a long time" and had been rebuked every time she asked for access to material from the 1930s. Urbach and fellow historians Franz Bosbach and John R. Davis listed Anglo-German correspondence to 1918 but were not sure if they had seen all the material and were not allowed access to the secret internal catalogue held by the head archivist.

An anonymous author was forced to abandon his writing of a biography of Prince George, Duke of Kent as his access to files was so limited. He felt that Prince George's file in The National Archives had "obviously been weeded" and he was denied access to the Royal Archives which he felt amounted to censorship. The authors of The Secret Royals, Richard J. Aldrich and Rory Cormac compared the secrecy of the royal family to that of intelligence agencies, writing that both " ... control and curate their own histories carefully; both are exempt from freedom of information requests. ... The royal family, by contrast, are the real enemies of history. There is no area where restrictions and redactions are so severe".

== See also ==
- Royal Collection
- Royal Library
