= Ronald Allison =

British journalist (1932–2022)

Ronald William Paul Allison (26 January 1932 – 26 July 2022) was a British journalist. He was the press secretary of Queen Elizabeth II from 1968 to 1978.

== Books ==
- Look Back in Wonder (1968) Hodder and Stoughton
- Charles, Prince of Our Time (1978)
- Britain in the Seventies (1980) Country Life Books
- The Royal Encyclopaedia, co-authored with Sarah Riddell (1991)
- The Queen: 50 Years – a Celebration (2001)
