= Robert Fellowes, Baron Fellowes =

British courtier (1941–2024)

The Right Honourable The Lord Fellowes GCB GCVO QSO PC
- Fellowes in 2017

Private Secretary to the Sovereign
- In office 19 October 1990 – 4 February 1999
- Monarch: Elizabeth II
- Deputy: Kenneth Scott (until 1996); Robin Janvrin (from 1996)
- Preceded by: Sir William Heseltine
- Succeeded by: Sir Robin Janvrin

Member of the House of Lords
- Lord Temporal
- Life peerage 12 July 1999 – 10 February 2022

Personal details
- Born: 11 December 1941 Sandringham, Norfolk, England
- Died: 29 July 2024 (aged 82) Norfolk, England
- Spouse: Lady Jane Fellowes (m. 1978)
- Children: 3
- Relatives: Diana, Princess of Wales (sister-in-law); Ronald Ferguson (first cousin)
- Education: Eton College

Robert Fellowes, Baron Fellowes (11 December 1941 – 29 July 2024) was a British courtier who served as private secretary to Queen Elizabeth II from 1990 to 1999. He was the brother-in-law of Diana, Princess of Wales, and a maternal first cousin of Ronald Ferguson, the father of Sarah Ferguson.

== Early life ==
Robert Fellowes was born on 11 December 1941 in Sandringham, Norfolk, the son of Sir William Albemarle Fellowes (1899–1986), a major in the Scots Guards and land agent of the Sandringham estate, and Jane Charlotte Ferguson (1912–1986). His maternal grandfather, Brigadier-General Algernon Francis Holford Ferguson (1867–1943), was the great-grandfather of Sarah Ferguson. His paternal family hail from Shotesham, Norfolk, and are a landed gentry family, a junior branch of the barons de Ramsey.

Fellowes was educated at Eton College. He received a short service commission in the Scots Guards in 1960. He played cricket for Norfolk in the 1959 Minor Counties Championship, making one appearance each against Buckinghamshire and the Nottinghamshire Second XI.

== Career ==
After leaving the Guards in 1963, Fellowes entered the banking industry. He worked for Allen Harvey and Ross Ltd, discount brokers and bankers, from 1964 until 1977, becoming a managing director from 1968. He was first offered a position in the royal household in 1974, but declined until his firm was in a better financial position.

In 1977, Fellowes joined the royal household as assistant private secretary to the sovereign. He spent the next 20 years in the Private Secretary's Office. He became deputy in 1986 succeeding Sir William Heseltine as principal private secretary to the sovereign in 1990. Upon his appointment, he was sworn into Her Majesty's Privy Council, entitling him to the prefix The Right Honourable for life. His tenure included Queen Elizabeth II's annus horribilis in 1992 and the death of his sister-in-law, Diana, in 1997.

Fellowes left his position in February 1999 to return to private banking, his retirement having been implied on 1 June 1998 when his successor, Robin Janvrin was named. He was created a life peer on 12 July 1999, taking the title Baron Fellowes, of Shotesham in the County of Norfolk, in the Queen's Birthday Honours List. He sat as a crossbench peer until his retirement on 10 February 2022.

Fellowes was introduced to the House of Lords and took his seat formally on 26 October 1999. He remained technically a member of the royal household, having been appointed an extra equerry to the Queen following his retirement. He served as secretary and registrar of the Order of Merit from 2003 to 2022.

== Personal life and death ==
On 20 April 1978, Fellowes married Lady Jane Spencer, elder sister of Diana, Princess of Wales, at the Guards' Chapel, Wellington Barracks. He was an assistant private secretary to the Queen at the time. Diana who married Charles, Prince of Wales, in 1981, was a bridesmaid. Fellowes and Spencer had three children and five grandchildren.

In the mid-1990s, Fellowes approached Lucian Freud to ask him to paint the Queen. The pair became friends through their negotiations for the portrait, and Freud painted Fellowes in 1999. They often dined at White's private members' club in St James's. Freud's portrait of Fellowes was put up for auction at Sotheby's in 2015 with an estimate of £600-800,000. Freud's portrait of the Queen was completed in 2001.

Fellowes died in Norfolk on 29 July 2024, aged 82. His funeral was held at St Mary's Church, Snettisham on 28 August, and was attended by his nephews, Princes William and Harry.

== In popular culture ==
Fellowes was portrayed by Dominic Jephcott in The Queen and by Andrew Havill in series five and six of The Crown.

== Honours ==
Fellowes was a member of Her Majesty's Most Honourable Privy Council (PC) from 1990, an extra equerry from 1997, and a life peer from 1999.

| Knight Grand Cross of the Order of the Bath (GCB) | 31 December 1997 |
| Knight Commander of the Order of the Bath (KCB) | 31 December 1990 |
| Companion of the Order of the Bath (CB) | 31 December 1986 |
| Knight Grand Cross of the Royal Victorian Order (GCVO) | 15 June 1996 |
| Knight Commander of the Royal Victorian Order (KCVO) | 17 June 1989 |
| Member of the Royal Victorian Order (MVO) | 11 June 1983 |
| Queen Elizabeth II Silver Jubilee Medal | 6 February 1977 |
| Companion of the Queens Service Order (QSO) | 31 December 1998 |

== Arms ==
Coat of arms of Robert Fellowes, Baron Fellowes
| Coronet Coronet of a baron Crest A Lion's Head erased Or, murally crowned Argent, charged on the neck with a Fess dancettée Ermine Escutcheon Azure, a Fess indented Ermine, between three Lions' Heads erased Or, murally crowned Argent Orders Order of the Bath (CB 1987; KCB 1991; GCB 1998); Royal Victorian Order (LVO 1983; KCVO 1989; GCVO 1996); Queen's Service Order (QSO 1999) |

== Notes ==
Court offices
| Preceded by Sir William Heseltine | Private Secretary to the Sovereign; 1990–1999 | Succeeded by Sir Robin Janvrin |
