= Private Secretary to the Sovereign =

Leading position in the UK Royal Household

- Royal Coat of Arms

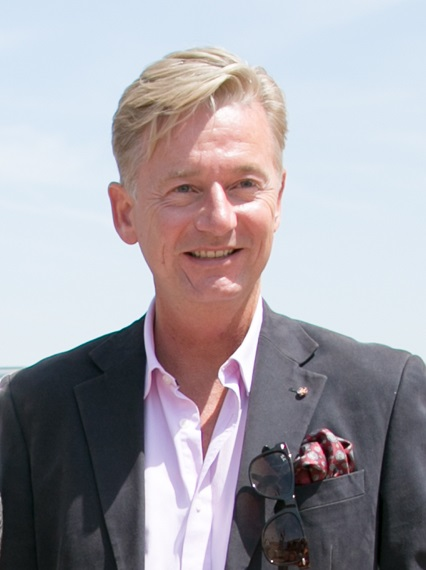
- Incumbent; Sir Clive Alderton since 8 September 2022
- Royal Households of the United Kingdom
- Style: The Right Honourable (UK and the Commonwealth)
- Member of: Privy Council
- Reports to: The Sovereign
- Seat: Buckingham Palace
- Nominator: The Sovereign
- Appointer: The Sovereign
- Term length: At His Majesty's pleasure
- Formation: 1805
- First holder: Herbert Taylor
- Deputy: Deputy Private Secretary to the Sovereign

The private secretary to the sovereign is the senior operational member of the Royal Household of the sovereign of the United Kingdom (as distinct from the great officers of the Household, whose duties are largely ceremonial). The private secretary is the principal channel of communication between the monarch and the governments in most of the Commonwealth realms. (Note: The principal channel of communication between the monarch and the governments in Canada is the Canadian Secretary to the King.) They also have responsibility for the official programme and correspondence of the sovereign. Through these roles the position wields considerable influence. This is one of the most senior positions within the Royal Household.

The current private secretary position is held by Sir Clive Alderton.

== History ==
English monarchs have had secretaries and clerks since at least the late Middle Ages, under various titles such as King's Clerk, King's Secretary, or Principal Secretary. This office turned into the Secretary of State, and eventually became a governmental position. The Scottish monarchy had a similar office, the Secretary of Scotland.

Colonel Herbert Taylor, who was appointed in 1805, is acknowledged as the first private secretary to the sovereign. However, the office was not formally established until 1867. Constitutionally, there was some opposition on the part of ministers to the creation of an office that might grow to have considerable influence upon the sovereign. However, it was soon realised that the sovereign was in need of secretarial support, since his or her ministers had ceased to provide daily advice and support with the growth of ministerial government. Queen Victoria did not have a private secretary until she appointed General Charles Grey to the office in 1861; her husband Prince Albert had in effect been her secretary until his death.

== Functions ==
The principal functions of the office are:

- to act as a channel of communication between the sovereign and his or her governments, and to advise the sovereign on constitutional, political or governmental questions;
- to organise the official programme of the sovereign, and to ensure its acceptability to both the sovereign and the government; these duties including drafting speeches, maintaining connection with other households, the Royal Train, The King's Helicopter, No. 32 (The Royal) Squadron RAF, and the armed forces – the last through the Defence Services Secretary; and
- to deal with the sovereign's official correspondence (including congratulatory messages), from members of the public, Royal Communications, and the Court Circular; and also to deal with the sovereign's private papers, the Royal Archives, and the monarchy's official website.

The position of private secretary is regarded as equivalent to that of the permanent secretary of a government department. The incumbent is always made a privy counsellor on appointment, and has customarily received a peerage upon retirement (a life peerage since 1972, although a small number have been given hereditary titles). Until 1965, peerages granted to Private Secretaries were hereditary baronies, with the exception of Lord Knollys, who was created a viscount in 1911. All private secretaries since the time of Lord Stamfordham have been created peers, with the exceptions of Sir Alexander Hardinge (inherited his father's barony in 1944), Sir Alan Lascelles (declined as he felt titles to be a show of self-importance) and Sir William Heseltine (who was an Australian).

Private secretaries to the sovereign are always knighted, typically in the Order of the Bath or the Royal Victorian Order, or both. The same is often true for principal private secretaries to other members of the Royal Household, such as the Prince of Wales.

The private secretary is head of only one of the several operational divisions of the Royal Household. However, he or she is involved in co-ordination between various parts of the household, and has direct control over royal communications, the Royal Archives, and the office of the Defence Services Secretary.

There are 57 people employed in the office of the monarch's private secretary.

=== Liaison with the government ===
The private secretary is responsible for liaising with the Cabinet Secretary, the Privy Council Office (PCO), and the Ministry of Justice's Crown Office in relation to:

- appointments that are formally made by the sovereign;
- the scheduling of the meetings of the Privy Council; and
- the transmission of official documents that need to be signed by the sovereign.

The private secretary is, with the Cabinet Secretary and the Principal Private Secretary to the Prime Minister, part of the "golden triangle" of officials responsible for supporting the sovereign to appoint a prime minister in the event of a hung parliament, when it is not immediately clear who can command a majority in the House of Commons. This is important for ensuring that the sensitive process runs smoothly and that the sovereign is not implicated in political debate or manoeuvres.

=== Security ===
Reporting to the private secretary is the role of director for security liaison, which was established following a recommendation of the Security Commission in 2004. The post was first held by Brigadier Jeffrey Cook, who was in office from 2004 to 2008. The private secretary has general oversight of security policy, though the master of the household is also involved, and the keeper of the Privy Purse has responsibility for the ceremonial bodyguards, such as the gentlemen at arms and the yeomen of the Guard.

== List of private secretaries to the sovereign since 1805 ==
Private Secretary	Term of office		Peerage	Monarch (Reign)
Colonel; Herbert Taylor	1805	1811		George III (1760–1820; under regency from 1811)
Colonel; Sir John McMahon, 1st Baronet	1811	1817		The Prince Regent, later George IV (1820–1830)
Lieutenant-General; Sir Benjamin Bloomfield	1817	1822	Baron Bloomfield	The Prince Regent, later George IV (1820–1830)
Sir William Knighton	1822	1830		The Prince Regent, later George IV (1820–1830)
Lieutenant-General; Sir Herbert Taylor	1830	1837		William IV (1830–1837)
William Lamb, 2nd Viscount Melbourne (informally, while Prime Minister)	1837	1840		Victoria (1837–1901)
Prince Albert (informally)	1840	1861		Victoria (1837–1901)
Colonel; Sir Charles Beaumont Phipps	1861	1866		Victoria (1837–1901)
General; Charles Grey	1861	1870		Victoria (1837–1901)
Major-General; Sir Henry Ponsonby	1870	1895		Victoria (1837–1901)
Lieutenant-Colonel; Sir Arthur Bigge	1895	1901	Baron Stamfordham	Victoria (1837–1901)
Francis Knolyss, 1st Baron Knollys	1901	1910	Viscount Knollys	Edward VII (1901–1910)
Francis Knolyss, 1st Baron Knollys	1910	1913	Viscount Knollys	George V (1910–1936)
Lieutenant-Colonel; Arthur Bigge, 1st Baron Stamfordham	1910	1931		George V (1910–1936)
Colonel; Clive Wigram, 1st Baron Wigram	1931	1936		George V (1910–1936)
Major; Sir Alec Hardinge	1936	1936	Baron Hardinge of Penshurst	Edward VIII (1936)
Major; Sir Alec Hardinge	1936	1943	Baron Hardinge of Penshurst	George VI (1936–1952)
Captain; Sir Alan "Tommy" Lascelles	1943	6 February 1952		George VI (1936–1952)
Captain; Sir Alan "Tommy" Lascelles	6 February 1952	1953		Elizabeth II (1952–2022)
Lieutenant-Colonel; Sir Michael Adeane	1 January 1954	1 April 1972	Baron Adeane (for life)	Elizabeth II (1952–2022)
Lieutenant-Colonel; Sir Martin Charteris	1 April 1972	12 November 1977	Baron Charteris of Amisfield (for life)	Elizabeth II (1952–2022)
Sir Philip Moore	12 November 1977	1 April 1986	Baron Moore of Wolvercote (for life)	Elizabeth II (1952–2022)
Sir William Heseltine	1 April 1986	19 October 1990		Elizabeth II (1952–2022)
Sir Robert Fellowes	19 October 1990	4 February 1999	Baron Fellowes (for life)	Elizabeth II (1952–2022)
Lieutenant; Sir Robin Janvrin	4 February 1999	8 September 2007	Baron Janvrin (for life)	Elizabeth II (1952–2022)
Sir Christopher Geidt	8 September 2007	17 October 2017	Baron Geidt (for life)	Elizabeth II (1952–2022)
Sir Edward Young	17 October 2017	8 September 2022	Baron Young of Old Windsor (for life)	Elizabeth II (1952–2022)
Sir Edward Young	8 September 2022	15 May 2023	Baron Young of Old Windsor (for life)	Charles III (2022–present)
Sir Clive Alderton	8 September 2022	present		Charles III (2022–present)

=== Deputy private secretaries to the sovereign since 1972 ===
Deputy Private Secretary	From	To
Sir Philip Moore	1972	1977
Sir William Heseltine	1977	1986
Sir Robert Fellowes	1986	1990
Sir Kenneth Scott	1990	1996
Sir Robin Janvrin	1996	1999
Mary Francis	February 1999	June 1999
Christopher Geidt	2005	2007
Edward Young	2007	2017
David Hogan-Hern	2022	2022
John Sorabji	2022	2023
Matthew Magee	2022	2024
Chris Fitzgerald	2022	2024
Theo Rycroft	2024	present

=== Assistant private secretaries to the sovereign since 1878 ===
Assistant Private Secretary	From	To
Lieutenant-Colonel Sir Fleetwood Edwards	1878	1895
Colonel Sir Arthur Bigge	1880	1895
Lieutenant-Colonel Sir Frederick Ponsonby	1895	1914
Colonel Sir Arthur Davidson	1901	1910
Colonel Sir Clive Wigram	1910	1931
Rowland Baring, 2nd Earl of Cromer	1916	1920
Major Sir Alexander Hardinge	1920	1936
Sir Frank Herbert Mitchell	1931	1937
Sir Alan Lascelles	1935	1943
Sir Godfrey Thomas	1936	1936
Major Sir Michael Adeane	1936	1953
Sir Eric Mieville	1937	1945
Lieutenant-Colonel Sir Edward Ford	1946	1967
Lieutenant-Colonel Sir Martin Charteris	1952	1972
Philip Moore	1966	1972
William Heseltine	1972	1977
Robert Fellowes	1977	1985
Sir Kenneth Scott	1985	1990
Robin Janvrin	1990	1995
Mary Francis	1996	1999
Tim Hitchens	1999	2002
Kay Brock	1999	2002
Stuart Shilson	2001	2004
Christopher Geidt	2002	2005
Edward Young	2004	2007
Douglas King	2007	2012
Samantha Cohen	2010	2018
Tom Laing-Baker	2018	2022
Matthew Magee	2018	2022
Jennifer Jordan-Saifi	2022	2023
Dr Nathan Ross	2023	2025
Muna Shamsuddin	2023	present

== See also ==
- Canadian Secretary to the King
- Private secretary
