= Philip Moore, Baron Moore of Wolvercote =

Private Secretary to Queen Elizabeth II (1977–86)

Flight Lieutenant The Right Honourable The Lord Moore of Wolvercote GCB GCVO CMG QSO PC

Private Secretary to the Sovereign
- In office 12 November 1977 – 1 April 1986
- Monarch: Elizabeth II
- Deputy: Sir William Heseltine
- Preceded by: Sir Martin Charteris
- Succeeded by: Sir William Heseltine

Member of the House of Lords
- Lord Temporal
- Life peerage 22 July 1986 – 7 April 2009

Personal details
- Born: Philip Brian Cecil Moore; 6 April 1921
- Died: 7 April 2009 (aged 88)
- Education: Brasenose College, Oxford

Philip Brian Cecil Moore, Baron Moore of Wolvercote (6 April 1921 – 7 April 2009) was Private Secretary to Queen Elizabeth II of the United Kingdom from 1977 to 1986.

== Coat of arms ==
Coat of arms of Philip Moore, Baron Moore of Wolvercote
Crest A moorcock Proper gorged with a crown Or holding in its dexter claw a quill pen Proper. Escutcheon Gules on a fess between two lions passant guardant Or three moorcocks Sable crested Gules. Supporters Dexter a wolf Proper crowned Or gorged with a collar Argent fimbriated Or thereon roses Gules barbed and seeded Proper and cross crosslets Sable; sinister a stag Proper attired and unguled Or crowned also Or gorged with a collar Argent fimbriated Or thereon cross crosslets Sable and roses Gules barbed and seeded Proper therefrom a chain reflexed over the back ending in a ring Gold. Compartment A grassy mount growing therefrom on each side between a thistle and a shamrock both Proper a rose Gules stalk and leaves Vert barbed and seeded to the front thereof on the dexter side a rugby football and similarly on the sinister side a cricket ball Proper. Motto Moribus Et Consilio

== Early life and education ==
He was educated at the Dragon School, Cheltenham College, then Brasenose College, Oxford, and served in RAF Bomber Command during World War II. He played one match for the England international rugby union team, against Wales in the 1951 Five Nations Championship.

== Career ==
Moore was then Private Secretary from 1957 to 1958, to the 10th Earl of Selkirk in the latter's capacity as First Lord of the Admiralty. He was Deputy British High Commissioner (and acting HC) in Singapore, 1963–65, and back in the UK, Chief of Public Relations of the Ministry of Defence 1965–66. He was then Assistant Private Secretary to Queen Elizabeth II from 1966 to 1972, then as Deputy until 1977 and as Private Secretary to the Sovereign until 1986. On his retirement in 1986, he was created Baron Moore of Wolvercote, of Wolvercote in the City of Oxford and he lived in a grace and favour apartment in Hampton Court Palace. He received the honour of being made a Permanent Lord in Waiting.

His former son-in-law is the singer Peter Gabriel and singer Melanie Gabriel his granddaughter. His wife Joanna died in 2011 aged 86.

Court offices
Preceded by Sir Martin Charteris	Private Secretary to the Sovereign; 1977–1986	Succeeded by Sir William Heseltine
