= Robin Janvrin, Baron Janvrin =

Private Secretary to Elizabeth II from 1999 to 2007

The Right Honourable The Lord Janvrin GCB GCVO QSO PC
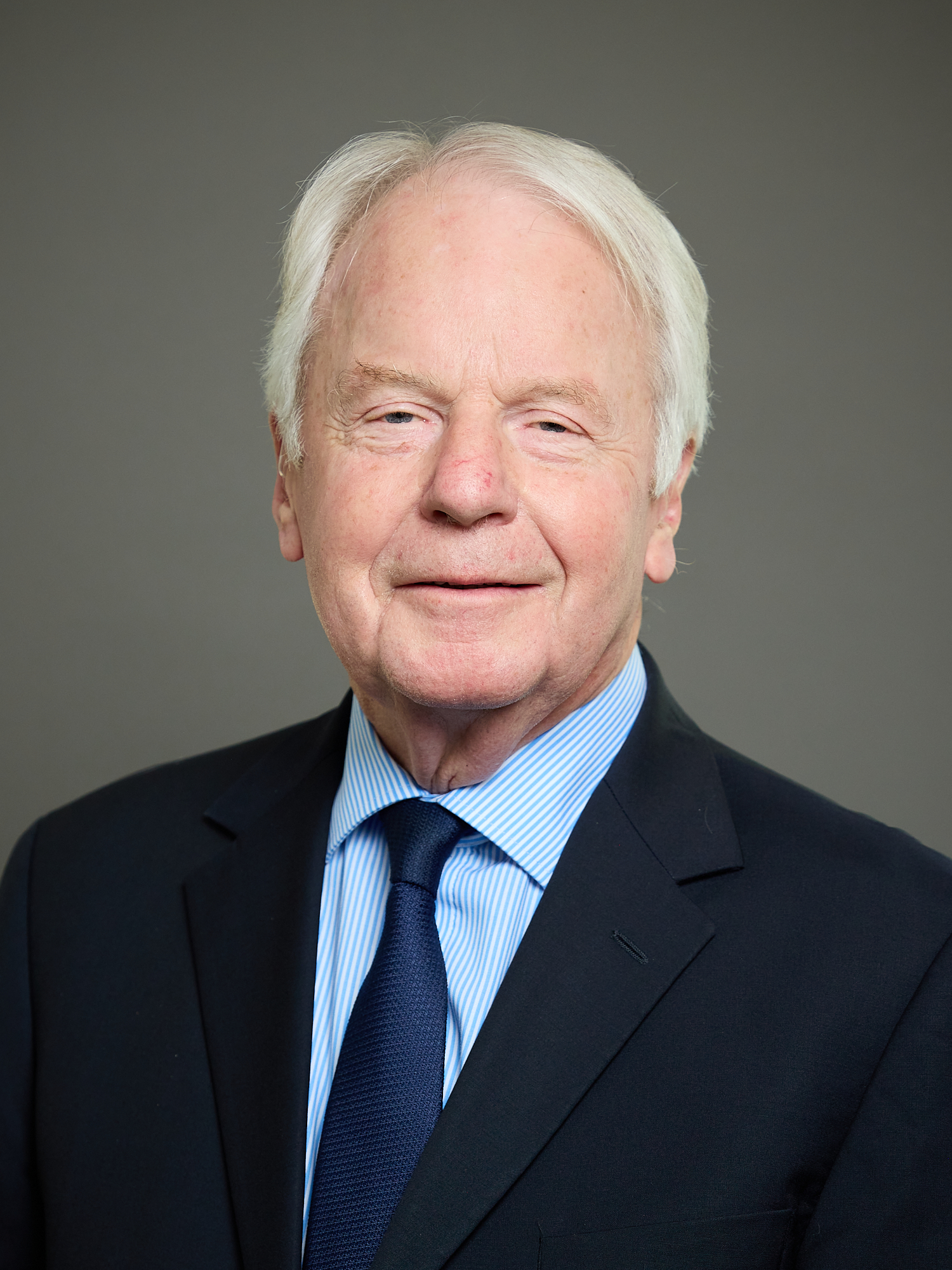
- Official portrait, 2025

Private Secretary to the Sovereign
- In office 4 February 1999 – 8 September 2007
- Monarch: Elizabeth II
- Deputy: Sir Christopher Geidt (from 2005)
- Preceded by: Sir Robert Fellowes
- Succeeded by: Sir Christopher Geidt

Press Secretary to the Sovereign
- In office 1 June 1987 – 19 October 1990
- Monarch: Elizabeth II
- Preceded by: Michael Shea
- Succeeded by: Charles Anson

Member of the House of Lords
- Lord Temporal
- Life peerage 10 October 2007

Personal details
- Born: 20 September 1946 (age 80) Cheltenham, Gloucestershire, England
- Spouse: Isabelle de Boissonneaux de Chevigny (m. 1977)
- Parent(s): Richard Janvrin; Nancy Fielding
- Education: Britannia Royal Naval College; Brasenose College, Oxford

Military service
- Allegiance: United Kingdom
- Branch/service: Royal Navy
- Years of service: 1966–1975
- Rank: Lieutenant

Robin Berry Janvrin, Baron Janvrin, GCB, GCVO, QSO, PC (born 20 September 1946) is a British naval officer and diplomat who was private secretary to Elizabeth II from February 1999 to September 2007.

== Early life ==
Born in Cheltenham, Gloucestershire, Robin Berry Janvrin is the son of Vice Admiral Sir Richard Janvrin and Nancy Fielding. He was educated at Marlborough College, Britannia Royal Naval College, Dartmouth, and Brasenose College, Oxford, from which he received a first class bachelor's degree in philosophy, politics and economics in 1969, and of which he was made an Honorary Fellow in 1999. In 1962, he was selected to attend Camp Rising Sun in upstate New York.

== Career ==
Janvrin entered the Royal Navy in 1964, was commissioned as an acting sub-lieutenant on 1 September 1966, promoted lieutenant on 4 March 1971, and served until 2 July 1975. He subsequently became a member of the Castaways' Club. On leaving the navy, Janvrin joined the Foreign and Commonwealth Office. He was a Second Secretary in 1975 and was appointed First Secretary at the mission to NATO in 1976. He was officially appointed an Officer of the Diplomatic Service on 7 February 1979. Janvrin was First Secretary in New Delhi from 1981 to 1984, during which time he was made a member of the 4th Class of the Royal Victorian Order for services during the Queen's state visit to India.

Janvrin was then counsellor and deputy head of the Department for the Personnel Department of the Foreign and Commonwealth Office from 1985 to 1987.

On 1 June 1987 Janvrin was recruited as press secretary to the Queen, though it was initially thought that he would be appointed assistant press secretary. In 1990, he was awarded the New Zealand 1990 Commemoration Medal. On 19 October 1990 he became assistant private secretary to the Queen, and in 1996 the deputy private secretary. He was promoted a commander of the Royal Victorian Order in the 1994 New Year Honours, a companion of the Order of the Bath in the 1997 New Year Honours, and a knight commander of the Royal Victorian Order in the 1998 New Year Honours. In February 1999 he succeeded Sir Robert Fellowes (later Lord Fellowes) as private secretary to the sovereign. He was promoted to knight commander of the Order of the Bath in the 2003 New Year Honours.

Janvrin was also a trustee of the Queen's 80th Birthday Trust, and was the chairman of trustees of The Royal Foundation of The Duke and Duchess of Cambridge and Prince Harry from 29 September 2009 to 1 April 2016.

Janvrin retired in September 2007, and was succeeded as private secretary by Christopher Geidt. He was promoted to Knight Grand Cross of the Order of the Bath in the 2007 Birthday Honours and, on 24 July, it was announced that Janvrin would be made a life peer, as one of the ten public servants per Parliament whom the Prime Minister may nominate for a peerage upon their retirement. His title was gazetted as Baron Janvrin, of Chalford Hill in the County of Gloucestershire on 10 October, and he sits as a crossbencher in the House of Lords. On the day of his retirement, 8 September, Janvrin was also promoted to Knight Grand Cross of the Royal Victorian Order by the Queen. In October, the Queen appointed Lord Janvrin to be a permanent lord-in-waiting in the royal household.

In the 2008 New Zealand New Year Honours, Lord Janvrin was made a companion of the Queen's Service Order for "services to New Zealand as Private Secretary to The Queen".

On 7 January 2008 Janvrin took up his appointment of deputy chairman, HSBC Private Bank (UK). Janvrin is also chairman of The Leadership Council, a research and thought leadership body in the UK. In 2008, he replaced Sir Christopher Mallaby as president of the British Entente Cordiale Scholarship trust.

== Marriage ==
Janvrin married Isabelle de Boissonneaux de Chevigny, daughter of French aristocrat Yann de Boissonneaux de Chevigny, in 1977.

== In popular culture ==
Janvrin was portrayed by Roger Allam in Stephen Frears' The Queen (2006) starring Helen Mirren.

Janvrin was portrayed by Jamie Parker in season 6 of The Crown. In episode 4, "Aftermath", Janvrin is depicted informing Queen Elizabeth II, Prince Charles, and Prince Philip of the death of Diana, Princess of Wales.

== Honours ==
On 10 October 2007 Sir Robert was raised to a peerage as Baron Janvrin.

Country	Date	Appointment	Ribbon	Post-nominal letters	Notes
United Kingdom	1983	Lieutenant of the Royal Victorian Order		LVO	Was promoted to CVO in 1994
United Kingdom	1994	Commander of the Royal Victorian Order		CVO	Was promoted to KCVO in 1998
United Kingdom	1997	Companion of the Order of the Bath		CB	Was promoted to KCB in 2003
United Kingdom	1998	Knight Commander of the Royal Victorian Order		KCVO	Was promoted to GCVO in 2007
United Kingdom	2002	Queen Elizabeth II Golden Jubilee Medal			
United Kingdom	2003	Knight Commander of the Order of the Bath		KCB	Was promoted to GCB in 2007
Saskatchewan, Canada	2005	Commemorative Medal for the Centennial of Saskatchewan			
United Kingdom	16 June 2007	Knight Grand Cross of the Order of the Bath		GCB	
United Kingdom	8 September 2007	Knight Grand Cross of the Royal Victorian Order		GCVO	
New Zealand	2008	Companion of the Queen's Service Order		QSO	

=== Styles ===
- Mr Robin Janvrin 1946–1983
- Mr Robin Janvrin MVO 1983–1984
- Mr Robin Janvrin LVO 1984–1994
- Mr Robin Janvrin CVO 1994–1997
- Mr Robin Janvrin CB CVO 1997–1998
- The Rt Hon Sir Robin Janvrin KCVO CB 1998–2003
- The Rt Hon Sir Robin Janvrin KCB KCVO 2003 – 16 June 2007
- The Rt Hon Sir Robin Janvrin GCB KCVO 16 June 2007 – 8 September 2007
- The Rt Hon Sir Robin Janvrin GCB GCVO 8 September 2007 – 10 October 2007
- The Rt Hon The Lord Janvrin GCB GCVO PC 10 October 2007 – 2008
- The Rt Hon The Lord Janvrin GCB GCVO QSO PC 2008–present

Court offices
Preceded by Sir Robert Fellowes	Private Secretary to the Sovereign; 1999–2007	Succeeded by Sir Christopher Geidt
Orders of precedence in the United Kingdom
Preceded by The Lord Darzi of Denham	Gentlemen; Baron Janvrin	Followed by The Lord Stern of Brentford
