= 1980 New Year Honours =

British royal recognitions

The 1980 New Year Honours were appointments in many of the Commonwealth realms of Queen Elizabeth II to various orders and honours to reward and highlight good works by citizens of those countries. They were announced on 31 December 1979 to celebrate the year passed and mark the beginning of 1980.

Names and titles of recipients are shown as they appeared in this honours list.

== United Kingdom ==
=== Knights Bachelor ===
- Harry Jefferson Barnes, C.B.E., Director, Glasgow School of Art.
- Professor James William Longman Beament, Chairman, Natural Environment Research Council.
- Charles William Bell, C.B.E. For political service in Scotland.
- Ronald McMillan Bell, Q.C., M.P. For political and public service.
- Professor Max Beloff, College at Buckingham. Principal of University
- Austin Ernest Bide, Chairman and Chief Executive, Glaxo Holdings Ltd.
- William Gibson Haig Clark, M.P. For political and public service.
- Robert James Clayton, C.B.E., Technical Director, The General Electric Company Ltd.
- Walter Clegg, M.P. For political and public service.
- Kenneth George Corfield, Chairman, Standard Telephones and Cables Ltd. For services to Export.
- Colin Rex Davis, C.B.E., Music Director, Royal Opera, Covent Garden.
- John Rogers Ellis, M.B.E., General Physician and Dean, London Hospital Medical College.
- Nigel Gordon Foulkes, Chairman, Civil Aviation Authority.
- John Drury Grugeon. For service to local government in Kent.
- John Donald Brown Junor, Editor, Sunday Express.
- Philip Douglas Knights, C.B.E., Q.P.M., Chief Constable, West Midlands Police.
- Leslie Francis Knipe, M.B.E. For political service in Wales.
- Ronald Graeme Millar. For political service.
- Richard O'Brien, D.S.O., M.C., Chairman, Manpower Services Commission.
- Stanley Paul Osmond, C.B., Secretary to the Church Commissioners for England.
- The Right Honourable Rodney Graham Page, M.B.E., M.P. For political and public service.
- David Elmer Woodbine Parish, C.B.E. For services to Education.
- Professor Michael Moissey Postan. For services to Economic History.
- The Honourable John Davan Sainsbury, Chairman, J. Sainsbury Ltd.
- David Perronet Sells. For political service in Eastern England.
- Charles Barry Shaw, C.B., Q.C., Director of Public Prosecutions for Northern Ireland.
- Peter Faulkner Shepheard, C.B.E. For services to Architecture.
- Eric Roy Sisson, Executive Chairman, Smiths Industries Ltd. For services to Export.
- Arthur Godfrey Taylor, Chairman, Association of Metropolitan Authorities.
- William Henry Trethowan, C.B.E., Professor of Psychiatry, University of Birmingham.
- Ian Murray McKellen, CBE, Actor.
- Eric Weiss, President, Foseco Minsep Ltd. For services to Export.
- Hugh David Hamilton Wills, C.B.E., T.D., D.L. For services to the Ditchley Foundation.
- Mr Justice Moshe Chaim Efraim Philip Biron, Judge of the High Court, Dar es Salaam.
- Joseph Gold, lately General Counsel to the International Monetary Fund.

==== State of Victoria ====
- The Honourable William Gordon Fry, of Beaumaris. For distinguished service to the Parliament of Victoria.

==== State of Queensland ====
- Clarence Arthur Campbell Leggett, M.B.E., of Kenmore. For distinguished and dedicated services to surgery and the community.
- Keith Douglas Morris, C.B.E., of Wellers Hill, for distinguished and dedicated service to the building industry and to the people of Queensland.

==== State of Western Australia ====
- The Honourable Desmond Henry O'Neil, of South Como. Deputy Premier of Western Australia.

=== Order of the Bath ===
==== Knight Grand Cross of the Order of the Bath (GCB) ====
Military Division

- General Sir David Fraser, K.C.B., O.B.E., A.D.C. Gen., late Grenadier Guards.

Civil Division

- Sir Douglas William Gretton Wass, K.C.B., Permanent Secretary, H.M. Treasury.

==== Knight Commander of the Order of the Bath (KCB) ====
Military Division

Royal Navy

- Vice-Admiral Stephen Ferrier Berthon.
- Vice-Admiral John David Elliott Fieldhouse.

Army

- Major General Frank Edward Kitson, C.B.E., M.C., Colonel Commandant 2nd Battalion The Royal Green Jackets.
- Major General Richard George Lawson, D.S.O., O.B.E., late Royal Tank Regiment.

Royal Air Force

- Acting Air Marshal Thomas Lawrie Kennedy, C.B., A.F.C., Royal Air Force.

Civil Division

- Brian David Hayes, C.B., Permanent Secretary, Ministry of Agriculture, Fisheries and Food.
- The Right Honourable Sir Philip Brian Cecil Moore, K.C.V.O., C.B., C.M.G., Private Secretary to The Queen and Keeper of Her Majesty's Archives.

==== Companion of the Order of the Bath (CB) ====
Military Division

Royal Navy

- Rear Admiral Edward James William Flower.
- Rear Admiral Peter Beauchamp Hogg.
- Rear Admiral John Richard Danford Nunn.

Army

- Major General Peter Lester Spurgeon.
- Brigadier Anne Field, A.D.C. Hon., Women's Royal Army Corps.
- Major General Francis William Edward Fursdon, M.B.E., late Corps of Royal Engineers.
- Major General Laurie William Albert Gingell, O.B.E., late Royal Tank Regiment (now R.A.R.O.).
- Major General John Vincent Homan, late Corps of Royal Electrical and Mechanical Engineers.
- Major General Francis Michael Sexton, O.B.E., late Corps of Royal Engineers.

Royal Air Force

- Air Vice-Marshal Peter Edward Bairsto, C.B.E., A.F.C., Royal Air Force.
- Air Vice-Marshal Geoffrey William Cloutman, Q.H.D.S., Royal Air Force.
- Air Vice-Marshal Peter Anthony Latham, A.F.C., Royal Air Force.
- Air Vice-Marshal Darrell Clive Arthur Lloyd, Royal Air Force.

Civil Division

- John Alvey, Deputy Controller, R. & D. Establishments and Research, and Chief Scientist, Royal Air Force, Ministry of Defence.
- John Anderson Armstrong, O.B.E., T.D., Master of the Court of Protection.
- Ralph Benjamin, Foreign and Commonwealth Office.
- John Alexander Bergin, Deputy Secretary, Lord Chancellor's Department.
- John Handel Clement, Under Secretary, Welsh Office.
- Gordon Stanley Downey, Deputy Secretary, Cabinet Office.
- George Edward Emery, Under Secretary, Ministry of Defence.
- Noel John Bebbington Evans, Deputy Chief Medical Officer, Department of Health and Social Security.
- John Egerton Grey, Clerk Assistant, House of Lords.
- Peter Harvey, Legal Adviser, Department of Education and Science.
- Henry Leonard James, lately Press Secretary, Prime Minister's Office, 10 Downing Street.
- Richard Austin James, M.C., Under Secretary, Home Office.
- Donald James Kirkness, Deputy Secretary, Overseas Development Administration.
- Hans Hubertus Liesner, Chief Economic Adviser, Department of Industry and Trade.
- Roy Kenneth Price, Under Secretary, Office of HM Procurator General and Treasury Solicitor.
- David Andrew Michael Pring, M.C., Clerk of Committees, House of Commons.
- Archibald Louden Rennie, Secretary, Scottish Home and Health Department.
- Anthony Savage, Under Secretary, Ministry of Agriculture, Fisheries and Food.
- Elizabeth Catherine, Mrs. Shore, Deputy Chief Medical Officer, Department of Health and Social Security.
- Alexander Silverleaf, Director, Transport and Road Research Laboratory, Department of Transport.

=== Order of St Michael and St George ===
==== Knight Grand Cross of the Order of St Michael and St George (GCMG) ====
- Sir Antony Duff, K.C.M.G., C.V.O., D.S.O., D.S.C., Foreign and Commonwealth Office.
- Sir Donald Tebbit, K.C.M.G., British High Commissioner, Canberra.

==== Knight Commander of the Order of St Michael and St George (KCMG) ====
- Michael Dacres Butler, C.M.G., United Kingdom Permanent Representative to the European Communities, Brussels.
- Walter Robert Haydon, C.M.G., H.M. Ambassador, Dublin.
- John Charles Moir Mason, C.M.G., H.M. Ambassador, Tel Aviv.
- Brian John Maynard Tovey, Director, Government Communications Headquarters.
- Michael Scott Weir, C.M.G., H.M. Ambassador, Cairo.

==== Companion of the Order of St Michael and St George (CMG) ====
- Robert Brash, H.M. Consul-General, Düsseldorf.
- The Right Reverend George Cardell Briggs, lately Anglican Bishop of the Seychelles.
- Alan Brooke Turner, Minister, H.M. Embassy, Moscow.
- Bryan George Cartledge, H.M. Ambassador (designate), Budapest.
- Martin Kenneth Ewans, Deputy British High Commissioner, New Delhi.
- Roy Fox, O.B.E., H.M. Consul-General, Houston.
- Roger Blaise Ramsay Hervey, Counsellor, H.M. Embassy, The Hague.
- Rex Masterman Hunt, lately Deputy British High Commissioner, Kuala Lumpur.
- Gordon Wesley Jewkes, H.M. Consul-General, Cleveland.
- The Honourable Ivor Thomas Mark Lucas, H.M. Ambassador, Muscat.
- Philip Louis Victor Mallet, British High Commissioner, Georgetown.
- Achilles Symeon Papadopoulos, M.V.O., M.B.E., H.M. Ambassador, Maputo
- Robin William Renwick, Foreign and Commonwealth Office.
- Jeremy Cashel Thomas, H.M. Ambassador, Luxembourg.
- Michael Charlton Whittall, O.B.E., Foreign and Commonwealth Office.

===== State of New South Wales =====
- Lawford Richardson, of Killara. For service to the community.

===== State of Victoria =====
- Robert Taylor Balderstone, M.C., of Wellington. For service to the Royal Agricultural Society of Victoria.

===== State of Queensland =====
- Leonard Thomas Knevitt, of Surfers Paradise. For services to the business community.

===== State of South Australia =====
- Gordon Desmond Combe, M.C., of Edwardstown. For public service.

===== State of Western Australia =====
- Slade Drake-Brockman, of Dalkeith. For his role in the 150th Anniversary Celebrations.
- Keith William Edwards, C.B.E., of Mosman Park. For services in the rural, commercial and community service fields.

=== Royal Victorian Order ===
==== Knight Grand Cross of the Royal Victorian Order (GCVO) ====
- Major Sir James Rennie Maudslay, K.C.B., K.C.V.O., M.B.E.

==== Knight Commander of the Royal Victorian Order (KCVO) ====
- Brigadier Sir Alexander Abel Smith, T.D., J.P.
- Mark Baring, C.V.O.
- Lieutenant Colonel Sir James Carreras, M.B.E.
- Air Commodore Archie Little Winskill, C.V.O., C.B.E., D.F.C., A.E.

==== Commander of the Royal Victorian Order (CVO) ====
- Philip Ayrton Grime, veterinary surgeon at Ascot
- John William George Barratt.
- Lieutenant Colonel Peter Thomas Clifton, D.S.O.
- Major William Richard Hern.
- Lady Ariel Olivia Winifred Keith.
- John William Rolfe Kempe.
- Sir Rupert Iain Kay Moncreiffe of that Ilk, Bt.
- Francis Michael Nunan, M.V.O.
- Michael Roger Ernest Ruffer, M.V.O., T.D.
- Charles Gordon Taylor, O.B.E., Q.P.M.
- The Reverend Prebendary Sidney Austen Williams.

==== Member of the Royal Victorian Order (MVO) ====
At this time the two lowest classes of the Royal Victorian Order were "Member (fourth class)" and "Member (fifth class)", both with post-nominal letters MVO. "Member (fourth class)" was renamed "Lieutenant" (LVO) from the 1985 New Year Honours onwards.

Fourth Class

- Lieutenant Colonel Charles Maynard Adderley.
- Fiona Violet, Mrs Aird.
- Commander Graham John Tyrrell Creedy, Royal Navy.
- Commander David Hart-Dyke, Royal Navy.
- Catherine Taylor Morton, Mrs Green.
- Wing Commander Stanley Kitchen, A.F.C., Royal Air Force.
- Peter Scott Larkman.
- Ronald McCulloch Matheson.
- Francis Nigel, Major the Lord Napier and Ettrick.
- Commander John Ernest Porter, Royal Navy.
- Felicity Margaret Salisbury Simpson, M.V.O.

Fifth Class

- John Edward Langford Bannister.
- Miss Ivy Vera Edmond.
- Geoffrey Charles Francis.
- Wilfrid Edward Hall.
- Brenda Mary, Mrs Hodgson.
- Joan Kathleen, Mrs Jackson.
- James McLachlan.
- Patricia Cranwill, Mrs Ranking.

=== Royal Victorian Medal (RVM) ===
==== Royal Victorian Medal (Silver) ====
- Jack George Albert Beard.
- Acting Chief Petty Officer Steward James Maclaine Bell.
- Arthur Haviland Birch.
- Reginald Edwin Cammell.
- Miss Bridget Conroy.
- Police Constable Leslie Thomas Day, Metropolitan Police.
- Robert Gray Hamilton.
- Warrant Officer Chalmers Hardie, Royal Air Force.
- Arthur Hay Johnston.
- Frederick George Mitchell.
- Margaret Johanna, Mrs Wood-Murray.
- David Alfred Gates.
- Dennis O'Hagan.
- Frederick Charles Owen.
- Police Constable Thomas Richard Rawlinson, Metropolitan Police.

=== Order of the British Empire ===
==== Knight Grand Cross of the Order of the British Empire (GBE) ====
Military Division

- General Sir Hugh Beach, K.C.B., O.B.E., M.C., Colonel Commandant Corps of Royal Engineers, Colonel Commandant Corps of Royal Electrical and Mechanical Engineers, Colonel Commandant Royal Pioneer Corps, Honorary Colonel Cambridge University Officers' Training Corps.

Civil Division

- The Right Honourable Michael John, Earl St. Aldwyn, K.B.E., T.D., D.L. For political and public service.

==== Dame Commander of the Order of the British Empire (DBE) ====
Civil Division

- Miss Phyllis Muriel Friend, C.B.E., Chief Nursing Officer, Department of Health and Social Security.
- Miss Cicely Mary Strode Saunders, O.B.E., Medical Director, St. Christopher's Hospice, London. For services to the care of the dying.

==== Knight Commander of the Order of the British Empire (KBE) ====
Diplomatic Service and Overseas List

- Charles Philip Haddon-Cave, C.M.G., Financial Secretary, Hong Kong.
- Alfred Joseph Hitchcock, Film Producer and Director.
- Richard Neil Posnett, C.M.G., O.B.E., lately British High Commissioner, Kampala.

===== State of Victoria =====
- Colonel Alfred Newcombe Kemsley, C.M.G., C.B.E., E.D., of Brighton. For distinguished service to the Shrine of Remembrance and returned servicemen.

===== State of South Australia =====
- The Honourable Charles Hart Bright, Q.C., of North Adelaide. For public service.

==== Commander of the Order of the British Empire (CBE) ====
Military Division

Royal Navy

- Captain William Alleyne Higgins, Royal Navy.
- Captain Richard Chester Read, Royal Navy.
- Commodore John Frank Wacher, R.D., Royal Naval Reserve.

Royal Navy

- Colonel Charles James Baines, M.C., T.D., A.D.C., D.L., late The North Staffordshire Regiment (The Prince of Wales's) Territorial Army.
- Brigadier Michael Edward Carleton-Smith, M.B.E., late The Royal Green Jackets.
- Colonel Peter Attwood Dally, late Royal Corps of Signals.
- Brigadier Michael Matthews, M.B.E., Corps of Royal Military Police.
- Brigadier Alan Frederick Mutch, A.D.C., Royal Pioneer Corps.
- Colonel Earle William Nicoll, M.V.O., late The Black Watch (Royal Highland Regiment).
- Colonel Peter Harry Bedford O'Meara, late The Queen's Lancashire Regiment.
- Colonel (Acting Brigadier) Angus Francis Fletcher Hope Robertson, late The Royal Anglian Regiment.
- Colonel Vera Margaret Rooke, R.R.C., Queen Alexandra's Royal Army Nursing Corps.

Royal Air Force

- Air Commodore Colin Arthur Grennan, M.B.E., Royal Air Force.
- Group Captain David John Edwards, A.F.C., Royal Air Force.
- Group Captain James Marshall, M.V.O., A.D.C., Royal Air Force.
- Group Captain John Fishleigh Woodard, Royal Air Force.

Civil Division

- William Denys Cathcart Andrews, lately President, Law Society of Scotland.
- Professor Graham William Ashworth, Chairman, Executive Committee, Civic Trust for the North West.
- Leonard Ashworth, Chief Executive, Davy Engineering Industries Ltd. For services to Export.
- Charles David Aubrey Baggley, Headmaster, Bolton School.
- Stanley Ernest Bailey, Q.P.M., Chief Constable, Northumbria Police.
- Henry Baillie, O.B.E., Senior Deputy Chief Constable, Royal Ulster Constabulary.
- John Vernon Barnett, Principal, College of Ripon and York St. John.
- William Gerald Beasley, Professor of the History of the Far East, School of Oriental and African Studies, University of London.
- Charles Edward Bellairs, O.B.E. For political service.
- John Arthur Berry, O.B.E., D.L. For public services in North Wales.
- Walter Andrew Biggar, O.B.E., M.C., Chairman, Animals Board, Joint Consultative Organisation for Research and Development in Agriculture.
- Joseph Black, Professor of Engineering, University of Bath.
- Alasdair Steele-Bodger, Professor of Veterinary Clinical Studies, University of Cambridge.
- Kenneth White Borthwick, Lord Provost, City of Edinburgh.
- William Ernest Burcham, Oliver Lodge Professor of Physics, University of Birmingham.
- Norman Alan Burges. For public services in Northern Ireland.
- Cyril Eric Carr. For political and public services.
- Ronald David Carter, Chairman and Managing Director, DCA Design Consultants Ltd.
- Norman Edgar Cook, lately Editor, Liverpool Daily Post.
- Leslie William Cox, D.S.C. For political and public services in the West of England.
- Peter Whalley Cunliffe, Chairman, Pharmaceuticals Division, Imperial Chemical Industries Ltd.
- Miss May Alison Davidson, lately Area Psychologist, Oxfordshire Area Health Authority.
- Alun Grier Davies, lately Director, Rio Tinto-Zinc Corporation Ltd.
- George Howard Davies, O.B.E., T.D. For political service in the West of England.
- Mary Meredydd Saunders-Davies. For political and public service in Wessex.
- Robert William Dean. For services to Equestrian Sport.
- Anthony John Dechant, Assistant Secretary, Manpower Services Commission.
- Alan Robert Devereux, lately Chairman, Confederation of British Industry in Scotland.
- Reginald Derek Henry Doyle, Chief Fire Officer, Kent Fire Brigade.
- Alan Duke, lately Assistant Secretary, Civil Service Department.
- John Pearse Gerard Dunne. For political and public service in Eastern England.
- Miss Pamela Margaret Yvonne Edwards, Headmistress, Skinners' Company's School for Girls, London.
- Peter Harry Elsley, Assistant Secretary, Department of the Environment.
- Michael Henry Ewbank, Chairman, Ewbank and Partners Ltd. For services to Export.
- Lewis Fialko. For political service.
- Joseph Gibson, Board Member, National Coal Board.
- Wilford Henry Gibson, Q.P.M., Assistant Commissioner, Metropolitan Police.
- Gordon Graham, Senior Partner, Architects Design Group.
- Alan Proctor Grant, Physician, Belfast City Hospital.
- David James Grant, Chairman, Darchem Ltd.
- George Michael Anthony Harrison, Chief Education Officer, Sheffield Local Education Authority.
- Walter Leopold Arthur Hayes, Vice Chairman, Ford of Europe.
- Stephen Hearst, Controller, Future Policy Group, British Broadcasting Corporation.
- Basil Arthur Hermon, Regional Works Officer, South West Thames Regional Health Authority.
- Joseph Edmund Hinde, Chairman, Printing Machinery Sector Working Party.
- David Hodge, Lord Provost, City of Glasgow.
- Rita Hunter (Rita Nellie, Mrs. Thomas), Singer.
- William Thomas Hutton, Assistant Secretary, Ministry of Defence.
- Allan Gwynne-Jones, D.S.O., Painter.
- Beti Jones, Chief Social Work Adviser, Scottish Office.
- Colonel Hugh Edward Hunter Jones, M.C., T.D., Chairman, East Anglia, Territorial Auxiliary and Volunteer Reserve Association.
- Leslie Thomas Loader. For political and public services in Wessex.
- Joseph Edward Lumb, Chairman, Allied Textile Companies Ltd. For services to Export.
- Eric Lyall. For political service in Eastern England.
- Peter Alexander McCunn, Deputy Chairman and Group Managing Director, Cable & Wireless
- Ronald Swift McNeill. For political service in Scotland.
- Norman Croumbie Macpherson, Solicitor in Scotland to the Admiralty Board.
- Norris Dewar McWhirter, Author and Publisher.
- John Basil Newland, Chairman, Northern Bank Ltd.
- Ronald George Owen, Employee Relations Adviser, Unilever Ltd.
- William Stanley Page, Principal Chief Officer and City Treasurer, Birmingham City Council.
- Alan Plumpton, Chairman, London Electricity Board.
- Peter James Prior, Chairman, H. P. Buhner (Holdings) Ltd.
- Donald Kirkman Redford, Chairman and Managing Director, Manchester Ship Canal Company.
- Robert Basil Reid, Member, British Railways Board.
- Trevor Rippington, Regional Treasurer, South Western Regional Health Authority.
- John Joseph Donald Rivers, O.B.E. For services to the Royal British Legion Housing Association Ltd.
- Richard Roberts, M.B.E., Chairman, Salford Area Health Authority.
- Ronald Foote Robertson, lately President, Royal College of Physicians of Edinburgh.
- Frank Arnold Robinson. For services to Chemistry.
- Harold Geoffrey Robson, Director of Marketing, National Girobank, Post Office.
- Jeremy Rowe, Chairman and Managing Director, London Brick Company Ltd.
- William Thomas Hawken Rowse, Chairman, Cornwall County Council.
- Andrew MacLeod Russell, lately Treasurer and General Manager, Bank of Scotland.
- Cyril Frederick Scurr, M.V.O., Consultant Anaesthetist, Westminster Hospital.
- Eric Sharp, Chairman, Monsanto Ltd. For services to Export.
- Kenneth Shuttleworth, lately Controller, Department of Health and Social Security.
- John Speirs, lately District Auditor, Department of the Environment.
- Gerald Maurice Stitcher, Chief Commoner, City of London.
- John Burton Sweeting, Assistant Secretary, Board of Inland Revenue.
- Geoffrey Templeman, D.L., Vice-Chancellor, University of Kent.
- William Henry Tench, Chief Inspector of Accidents, Department of Trade.
- Albert Jesse Thayre, M.B.E., Pro-Chancellor, University of Bradford.
- Graham Bruce Thomson, Director of Manufacturing, UK Plants, Dundee, Timex Corporation.
- Peter Eugene Trier, Director of Research and Development, Philips Electronic and Associated Industries Ltd.
- Thomas William Matthew Tuite, Senior Principal Inspector of Taxes, Board of Inland Revenue.
- Elston Grey-Turner, M.C., T.D., Secretary, British Medical Association.
- David Arthur John Tyrrell, Deputy Director, Clinical Research Centre, Medical Research Council.
- Herbert Waddell, T.D. For services to Rugby Football.
- Roland Henry Wade, Chairman, Council for the Protection of Rural England.
- Arthur Stephen Walsh, Managing Director, Marconi Space and Defence Systems Ltd. For services to Export.
- Tom Vivian Walters, Chief Executive, Mid Glamorgan County Council.
- Rachel Elizabeth, Mrs. Waterhouse. For services to consumer affairs.
- Horace John Webb, Collector, Dover, Board of Customs and Excise.
- William Southcombe Lloyd Webber. For services to Music.
- James Alfred Wilde, Chief Social Work Adviser, Department of Health and Social Services, Northern Ireland.
- Charles Cuthbert Powell Williams, lately Chairman, Price Commission.
- Thomas Eifion Hopkins Williams, Professor of Civil Engineering, University of Southampton.
- Margaret Elizabeth, Mrs. Wingfield. For political service.
- Geoffrey Wood, Consultant, Ove Arup Partnership. For services to Export.

Diplomatic Service and Overseas List

- Dr Harry Sin-yang Fang, O.B.E. For public services in Hong Kong.
- Michael Patrick Vivian Hannam, H.M. Consul-General, Jerusalem
- Gilbert Spence Harrison, O.B.E. For services to the British community in Naples.
- John Frederick Hely. For services to British commercial interests in Australia.
- Richard Hughes. For services to journalism in Hong Kong.
- Cecil Albert Jacobs, M.B.E., Managing Director, East Caribbean Currency Authority
- Alan Edward Moore, lately Financial Adviser, Bahrain.
- Gerald Barker Read, O.B.E. For services to British commercial interests in Kenya.
- John Frederick Charles Springford, O.B.E., lately British Council Representative, Canada.
- John Clifford Strong, Governor, Turks and Caicos Islands.

===== State of New South Wales =====
- Edward William Francis Bacon, of Sutherland. For service to the community.
- Emeritus Professor Lindsay Michael Birt, of Mount Pleasant. For service to education.
- Lorna, Mrs Hayter, of Lane Cove. For service to agriculture and the community.

===== State of Victoria =====
- The Honourable John William Galbally, Q.C., of Malvern. For service to the Parliament of Victoria.
- Councillor Irvin Peter Rockman, of Toorak. For service to the City of Melbourne.
- Peter William Thomson, M.B.E., of Malvern. For service to the sport of golf.

===== State of Queensland =====
- Angelo Efstathis, of New Farm. For his contribution to the welfare of the Greek community in Brisbane.
- Lionel Ker Strutton Hogg, of Holland Park. For services to journalism.

===== State of Western Australia =====
- William Sharp Davidson, of Peppermint Grove. For services to the community.

==== Officer of the Order of the British Empire (OBE) ====
Military Division

Royal Navy

- Commander Francis Philip Brooke-Popham, Royal Navy.
- Commander Gerald Olive Burnan, Royal Navy.
- Commander John William Chapman, Royal Navy.
- Major James Noel Anthony Goldsworthy, Royal Marines.
- Commander Anthony Paul Hoddinott, Royal Navy.
- Commander Peter Leslie Keenan, Royal Navy.
- Commander Peter John Russell, Royal Navy.
- Commander Geoffrey David Hutton Sample, D.S.C., Royal Navy.
- Commander Terence James Smy, Royal Navy.
- Commander John Pierre Torres Torr, Royal Navy.
- Commander John Cole Lowndes Wright, Royal Navy.

Army

- Lieutenant Colonel Brian Aldridge, The Royal Regiment of Fusiliers.
- Lieutenant Colonel Nicholas George Picton Ansell, 5th Royal Inniskilling Dragoon Guards.
- Lieutenant Colonel Eric Hugh Barker, Corps of Royal Engineers.
- Lieutenant Colonel John David Bidmead, Royal Corps of Transport.
- Lieutenant Colonel Colin John Bowden, M.B.E., The Parachute Regiment.
- Lieutenant Colonel Keith Dodd Brown, T.D., Royal Corps of Signals, Territorial Army.
- Lieutenant Colonel (Now Acting Colonel) Mark Edward Coe, Corps of Royal Engineers.
- Lieutenant Colonel Richard Eric Dale, T.D., The Royal Irish Rangers (27th (Inniskilling) 83rd and 87th), Territorial Army.
- Lieutenant Colonel William Telford Dennison, Corps of Royal Engineers.
- Lieutenant Colonel Robin Digby Grist, M.B.E., The Gloucestershire Regiment.
- Lieutenant Colonel (Quartermaster) Anthony William Heal, Royal Regiment of Artillery.
- Lieutenant Colonel Robert John Hodges, M.B.E., The King's Own Royal Border Regiment.
- Lieutenant Colonel John Charles Holman, The Queen's Regiment.
- Lieutenant Colonel Herbert John Orpen-Smellie, The Parachute Regiment.
- Lieutenant Colonel (Ordnance Executive Officer) Desmond Noel Paddy, Royal Army Ordnance Corps (Now Retired).
- Colonel (Acting) Wilfred Anthony Pledger, Army Cadet Force, Territorial Army (Now Retired).
- Lieutenant Colonel (Quartermaster) Roy Taylor, Corps of Royal Engineers (Now R.A.R.O.).
- Lieutenant Colonel Michael John Wilkes, Royal Regiment of Artillery.

Royal Air Force

- Acting Group Captain John Antony Horrell, Royal Air Force.
- Wing Commander Peter George Beer, M.V.O., Royal Air Force.
- Wing Commander Christopher William Bruce, Royal Air Force.
- Wing Commander Michael John Gibson, Royal Air Force.
- Wing Commander John Bartram Main, M.B.E., Royal Air Force.
- Wing Commander Michael John Marsh, Royal Air Force.
- Wing Commander Stephen Robert Parsons, Royal Air Force.
- Wing Commander James Shearer, Royal Air Force.
- Wing Commander Malcolm Westmoreland Sleight, Royal Air Force.
- Wing Commander Paul Everard Terrett, Royal Air Force.
- Wing Commander Patrick Stuart Edwin Tootal, Royal Air Force.

Civil Division

- David Emlyn Adamson, Principal, Ministry of Defence.
- Douglas Andrews, Principal Professional and Technology Officer (Fire), Department of the Environment.
- Mary Beatrice, Mrs. Armitage, lately Director of Social Services, Sheffield City Council.
- Frank Atkinson, Director, North of England Open Air Museum, Beamish Hill.
- Frank Harry Baker, D.F.C., A.E., Deputy Chairman, London and South East Region, Air Cadet Council.
- Kenneth Haigh Barker, D.L. For political and public service in the Midlands.
- William Kirkwood Begg, Chairman, Begg Cousland Holdings Ltd., Glasgow.
- Raymond George Bellchambers, Board Member, Milton Keynes Development Corporation.
- Barry William Vincent Bovey, Managing Director, Orbit Valve Ltd.
- Arthur Donald Brown, Principal Scientific Officer, Ministry of Defence.
- Lieutenant Commander Robert Gould Brown, V.R.D., General Secretary, Soldiers', Sailors' and Airmen's Families Association.
- William Robert Bruce, Land and Property Services Manager, Northern Ireland Housing Executive.
- Robert Patrick Bryan, Deputy Assistant Commissioner, Metropolitan Police.
- Brian Brindal Burridge, D.F.C., County Commissioner, Avon, The Scout Association.
- John Leslie Caldwell. For political and public service in London.
- Hugh Denis Carritt, lately Chairman, Gow Wilson Ltd.
- Edward John Challis, Production and Environmental Director, Petro-Chemicals Division, Imperial Chemical Industries Ltd.
- Roy Chappell. For political and public service in the Midlands.
- Stanley Charlesworth, National Secretary, National Council of Young Men's Christian Associations.
- Margaret Joyce, Mrs. Charlton. For political and public service in the North West of England.
- Miss Joan Chreseson, H.M. Inspector, Department of Education and Science.
- Thomas Christie, Director, Walker Shipyard, Swan Hunter Shipbuilders Ltd.
- Peter Bayliss Clarke, T.D., Consultant Oral Surgeon, Grampian Health Board.
- Harry Cliff, Area Administrator, Staffordshire Area Health Authority.
- Norman Robert Francis Collins, Chairman, South Western Council for Sport and Recreation.
- Norman Calvert Cooper, Chief Pharmacist, Department of Health and Social Services, Northern Ireland.
- Alexander Cormack, Managing Director, Everton Engineering Ltd., Newtownabbey.
- John Cornwell, lately Principal, West Midlands College of Higher Education.
- Samuel Joseph Cowan, lately President, Association of Local Authorities of Northern Ireland.
- Alfred Peter Cox, Principal, Dartington College of Arts, Totnes.
- Major Donald John Cropper, Secretary General, Federation of Personnel Services of Great Britain Ltd.
- The Reverend Robert Raymond Davey, M.B.E., Leader, Corrymeela Community, Northern Ireland.
- Francis Donald Davies, Area Director, South Nottinghamshire Area, National Coal Board.
- Alfreda Joan, Mrs. Dean, Chief Inspector, Surrey Local Education Authority.
- Captain Alexander Forrest Dickson, R.D., lately Head of Operational Services and lately Director, Shell International Marine Ltd.
- William Johnston Dickson, lately Chief Officer, Southern Education and Library Board, Northern Ireland.
- James Docherty, General Secretary, Scottish Secondary Teachers' Association.
- Charles Cecil Drury, District Organisation Officer, Scotland, National and Local Government Officers' Association.
- Eve Alice, Mrs. du Pre. For political service in London.
- David Brenig Edwards, Principal, Rotherham College of Technology.
- David Peter Garbett-Edwards, Development Director, Development Board for Rural Wales.
- Michael Paul Elliott, Artistic Director, The Royal Exchange Theatre Company, Manchester.
- Dorothy Alice, Mrs. Ellis, Chairman, English Bowls Council.
- Norman Guy Ellis, lately County Engineer, South Yorkshire County Council.
- Stanley Percy Esom, Chairman, Board of Visitors, Pentonville Prison.
- John Henry Evers, Member of Board, The London Metal Market and Exchange Company Ltd.
- John Frederick Farley, A.F.C., Chief Test Pilot, Kingston-Brough Division, Aircraft Group, British Aerospace. For services to Export.
- Frank Allan Fentiman. For public services in Surrey.
- Anne Dorothy, The Right Honourable The Countess of Feversham, M.B.E., Vice-Chairman, Women's Royal Voluntary Service.
- John Charles Eastwick-Field, Architect, Stillman and Eastwick-Field.
- James Gordon Findlay, Farmer, Angus.
- Arthur Fish, District Postmaster, South Eastern District Office, London Postal Region, Post Office.
- Tom Fleming (Thomas Kelman Fleming), Actor and Broadcaster.
- Ernest Floweth, M.B.E., Assistant Director of Road Safety, Royal Society for the Prevention of Accidents.
- Miss Marjorie Constance Fraser. For services to the British Red Cross Society in Berkshire.
- William Brian Fraser, Senior Principal, Department of Employment.
- Robert Owen Freeman, lately Area Administrator, Gwynedd Health Authority.
- Donald Alfred Frith, lately Chairman, York Community Council.
- Ronald George Fuller, lately Deputy Chairman, Latin American Trade Advisory Group.
- William Douglas Ross-Gardner. For political service in Yorkshire.
- Donald Clarence Garratt, Scientific Adviser, Pharmaceutical Society of Great Britain.
- Toni Gartell, Foreign and Commonwealth Office.
- Ronald Percy Gibbs, Senior Principal, Department of Transport.
- Harold Howard Gott, Managing Director, Associated Nuclear Services.
- Oswald Henry Grafton, Director, Freight Services, British Waterways Board.
- James Granger, Director, Clydeport Stevedoring Services Ltd.
- Patrick Thomas Grant, Director, Institute of Marine Biochemistry, Natural Environment Research Council.
- Miss Eileen Mary Grasett. For services to the magistracy in Derbyshire.
- Haig Gudenian, Vice-Chairman, Muscular Dystrophy Group of Great Britain.
- Peter Dudley Hall, Director, Corporate Communication, International Computers Ltd.
- Eric Gordon Hambrook, lately Director of Environmental Services, Stoke-on-Trent City Council.
- Samuel Hamer, Headmaster, Royal Liverpool Children's Hospital School.
- William Herbert Hamilton, Managing Director, Gulf Oil (Great Britain) Ltd.
- Paul Ratliff Harris, Chairman, Eastbourne Unit Committee, Sea Cadet Corps.
- Miss Enid Mary Harrison, Chairman, Age Concern, Northern Ireland.
- William Ernest Harriss. For services to housing in Paddington.
- John Alexander Hay, Chairman and Managing Director, Hay-Lambert Ltd.
- Michael Hearn, Managing Director, Aluminium Wire and Cable Company Ltd. For services to Export.
- James Hewitt, Commercial Director, Elswick and Hebburn Works, Vickers Ltd. Engineering Group.
- George Edward Hill, T.D., Member, Solihull Metropolitan Borough Council.
- John Frederick Hirst, Official Receiver (A), Insolvency Service, Department of Trade.
- Raymond Cyril Hodge, Regional Engineer, North West Thames Regional Health Authority.
- Denis Jack Hodges, Secretary, Central Council of Probation and After-Care Committees.
- Peter John Dixon Hodgson. For political service in the West of England.
- Geoffrey Jermyn Holborow, Chairman, Association of Cornish Boys' Clubs.
- Miss Isaline Blew Horner. For services to the Pali Text Society.
- Emlyn Walter Hughes. For services to Association Football.
- Thomas Edward Hurst. For services to the Birmingham Royal Institution for the Blind.
- Miss Daphne Gwendoline Hussey, District Nursing, Officer, Leicestershire Area Health Authority.
- Miss Muriel Jackson, Principal, Board of Customs and Excise.
- John Hamilton James, Conservator of Forests, North West England Conservancy, Forestry Commission.
- Walter William James, Chief Ambulance Officer, Department of Health and Social Security.
- Burton Harry Frederick Johnson Financial Adviser, Electricity Council.
- Kenneth Mansel Jenkins Jones, Principal, Trinity College, Carmarthen.
- Leonard Joughin, M.C., Director of Management Services Department, Metropolitan Police.
- Miss Mary Grace Joynson, Senior Director and Director of Child Care, Dr. Barnardo's.
- Edward Alexander Justice, Director of Overseas Sales and Export Operations, Talbot (UK). For services to Export.
- Maurice Arthur Kausman. For services to Angling.
- Sidney Harling Kennard, Vice-Chairman, Kent Area Health Authority.
- Samuel Wilkinson Kilburn, Chief Executive, Institute of Grocery Distribution.
- James Duncan Lapish, Chairman, Manpower and Productivity Sub-Group, Domestic Electrical Appliances Sector Working Party.
- Geoffrey Lee. For political service in the North West of England.
- Lilian, Mrs. Lerry, Headmistress, Kingsbury Day Special School, London Borough of Brent.
- John Campbell Bonner Letts. For services to National Heritage.
- Frederick George Lintott, Joint Managing Director, H. Huntsman Group of Companies. For services to Export.
- George David Lyttleton. For services to the community in Leeds.
- John Rae McBoyle, T.D., Regional Medical Officer, Department of Health and Social Security.
- Laura Marion, Mrs. McCaig, Provost, Stirling District Council.
- John Joseph McCarthy, lately Rector, Trinity Roman Catholic High School, Renfrew.
- Angus McDermid, Diplomatic Correspondent, British Broadcasting Corporation.
- Hector Robert Ferguson Macdonald, Chairman of Council, St. Andrew's Ambulance Association.
- James MacGregor, lately Registrar, University of Leeds.
- Walter Smith Sutherland Mackay, E.D., Consultant on Tea Development Projects.
- Leslie Roy Mann, Chairman and Managing Director, Victor Products (Wallsend) Ltd. For services to Export.
- Miss Sheila Ena Bridget Manning, lately District Nursing Officer, Hertfordshire Area Health Authority.
- Mary Anna Sibell Elizabeth, The Honourable Mrs. Marten. For political service in Wessex.
- Joseph Martucci, Secretary, Police Federation of England and Wales.
- Ronald Leslie Matthews, General Secretary, The Brewers' Society.
- Edward Garson Miller, Superintending Civil Engineer, Scottish Development Department.
- Joan Isobel, Mrs. Miller, lately Chairman, Lothian Region Children's Panel.
- Hugh Cecil Moreland, lately Principal, Department of Industry.
- William Peter Morgan, lately Operations Director (Buses), London Transport Executive.
- Lieutenant Colonel William Carter Munro, T.D., Director, Scottish Engineering Employers' Association.
- George Kent Newman, Director-General, Road Haulage Association.
- Miss Mary MacKenzie Nixon. For service to the Girl Guides Association in Scotland.
- Roger Arthur Carver Norrington, Musical Director, Kent Opera.
- George William North, Telecommunications Consultant, Civil Aviation Authority.
- Thomas Horace Oakman, Director, The Employment Fellowship.
- Joseph Leonard O'Hagan, General Manager and Branch Director, Reed Corrugated Cases Ltd., Warrenpoint.
- Henry Graham Partridge. For political and public service in Wales.
- William Darby Partridge, Deputy Secretary, Association of County Councils.
- Alexander David Paton, Provost, Kyle and Carrick District Council.
- Vera Naomi, Mrs. Paul, Appeal Director, Berkshire, Buckinghamshire and Oxfordshire Naturalists Trust.
- Alfred Standen Peters, General Dental Practitioner, Gerrards Cross.
- George Henry Pettingale, Principal, Swalcliffe Park School, Banbury.
- Richard Henry Pickering, Senior Principal, Lord Chancellor's Department.
- Frederick Austin Pielou, Assistant Chief Civil Hydrographic Officer, Minister of Defence.
- William James Price, lately Chairman, Transport Users' Consultative Committee, Yorkshire.
- Ryszard Puszkiewicz, Medical Administrator, Polish Hospital, Penley, Clwyd.
- Miss Alice Pyesmith Ramage. For services to the United Kingdom Home Economics Federation.
- Harold Reynolds, Joint Managing Director, Whitworths Holdings Ltd.
- Cliff Richard, Entertainer.
- Norman Frank Richards, M.B.E., Q.F.S.M., H.M. Inspector of Fire Services, Grade I, Fire Service Inspectorate.
- William Alan Rook. For political and public service in the Midlands.
- Bernard William George Rose. For services to Music.
- Norman Scott Ross, Senior Lecturer, Employer-Employee Relations, University of Birmingham.
- Norman James Sapsted. For political and public service in London.
- Robert Charles Scarlett, Director of Environment, Tyne and Wear County Council.
- Katalin Eva, Mrs. Schopflin, lately General Medical Practitioner, East London.
- Mervyn Nelson Scorgie. For political and public service hi London.
- Richard David Shepherd. For services to the conservation of wildlife.
- Thomas Hilary Sinclair. For services to Mountaineering.
- Jean Marjorie Guthrie, Mrs. Baird-Smith, Chairman, Polmont Borstal Institution Visiting Committee.
- John Edward Sharwood Smith, D.F.C., Senior Lecturer in Classics, Institute of Education, University of London.
- Kenneth Vernon Smith, Managing Director, Transmark.
- Robert Lupton Smith. For political and public service.
- Sholto Derek Solomon, Principal, Department of Commerce, Northern Ireland.
- Miss Diana Claire Sparks, Technical Adviser, Ministry of Defence.
- Stanley Denys Trevor Spittle, Principal Investigator, Royal Commission on Historical Monuments (England).
- Phyllis Diana, Mrs. Stafford. For political service in the South East of England.
- Captain John Stephen Stewart, Director, Nuffield Farming Scholarships Trust.
- Sydney John Stromqvist, Principal Professional and Technology Officer, Ministry of Defence.
- Daniel Styles, Chairman, Atkins Brothers (Hosiery) Ltd.
- Leslie Teeman, Group Managing Director, Clay Cross Company Ltd.
- Edmund Edgar Temple, Assistant Secretary-General, Association of Commonwealth Universities.
- Miss Edith Vera Thornton (Mrs. Parker), Principal, Ministry of Agriculture, Fisheries and Food.
- Francis Olaf Thornton, Member, Irvine New Town Development Corporation.
- Richard Eustace Thornton, D.L., Farmer, Surrey.
- John Ronald Troop, Senior Principal, Home Office.
- Gerard Alan Smith Turnbull, T.D. For public service in Cardiff.
- Frank Tweedle, lately Deputy Chairman, Wales Region, British Gas Corporation.
- Alan Usher, Professor of Forensic Pathology, University of Sheffield.
- Peter Joseph Usher, Managing Director, Woolston Yard, Vosper Thornycroft (UK) Ltd.
- Manfred Philip Vanson, Executive Director, The Jewish Blind Society.
- Mary, Mrs. Russell Vick. For services to Women's Hockey.
- Ronald John Ward, Chief Accountant, Board of Inland Revenue.
- Peter John Warren, Member, Cambridge City Council.
- James Andrew Allan Watt, Co-ordinator, Scottish Veterinary Investigation Services.
- Miss Elizabeth McGowan Kerr Welsh, Director of Nursing and Midwifery Education, Northern Ireland Council for Nurses and Midwives.
- Patrick Francis Michael White, Q.P.M., Deputy Chief Constable, North Yorkshire Police.
- Raymond Dudley Wickham. For services to fruit growing in Kent.
- Harold Emmott Williams. For services to industry in Wales.
- Keith Arthur Wood, Executive Director, Decca Software Sciences Ltd., and Flight Navigation Ltd.
- Ronald Robin Wood, Managing Director, Muirhead Data Communications Ltd. For services to Export.
- Elizabeth, Mrs. Cory-Wright. For services to young people in Hertfordshire.

Diplomatic Service and Overseas List

- Philip Edward Aldous, Government Secretary, St Helena.
- Wilfred Osmond Barzey, M.B.E. For public services in Montserrat.
- Michael Patrick Bentley. For services to British commercial interests and the British community in Malaysia.
- Dr Donald Keith Bowden, Physician Specialist, British Base Hospital, New Hebrides Condominium.
- Emile Leslie Bridges. For services to ex-Servicemen and to the British community in Antwerp.
- Ernest William Busby, M.B.E., H.M. Consul (Commercial), British Consulate-General, Detroit.
- James Henry Callan, lately H.M. Consul (Commercial), British Consulate-General, Osaka.
- Peter Kenneth Cavaye, British Council Representative, Hong Kong.
- Gerard Chippindall. For services to British interests in Beirut.
- Dr Peter Seymour Vergil Cox. For services to medicine and the community in Kenya.
- Edred Alexander Dakers, Permanent Secretary, Establishments, Belize.
- Robert Philip De Burlet, Consul, British Consulate, Quebec.
- Malcolm Robert William Dexter, lately British Council Representative, Muscat.
- Dr Edward Richard Dingley. For services to medicine and the British community in Sabah, Malaysia.
- Geoffrey Douglas Eden, Director of Accounting Services, Hong Kong.
- Denis Frederick Elliott, lately H.M. Consul (Commercial), British Consulate-General, Johannesburg.
- Reginald Godley, lately First Secretary (Aid), British High Commission, Nairobi.
- John Melman Harrison. For services to British commercial interests in Australia.
- Romald Patrick Helmerow Helmer. For services to British commercial interests in Colombia.
- Wyndham Colin Hopkins, Honorary British Consul, Djibouti.
- Leonard Victor Ingrams. For services to British interests and the British community in Saudi Arabia.
- Kenneth Vivian Richards Jefferies. For services to British Interests and the British community in Iran.
- Jacques Alecxis Kirk. For services to British aviation interests and the British community in Toulouse.
- Max William Georges Le Mansois-Field, lately Head Interpreter, NATO International staff, Brussels.
- Frederick Raymond Love, First Secretary, H.M. Embassy, Brussels.
- Edward Lucas, M.V.O., Deputy British High Commissioner, St Vincent.
- Lieutenant-Colonel James Anthony Lys, M.C., (Retd.) Director Ghurka Reintegration Scheme, Nepal.
- Harwell Moncrieffe McCoy, M.B.E., B.E.M., Principal Secretary, Cayman Islands.
- Professor Margaret Frances May Macpherson, M.B.E. For services to University education in Uganda.
- John William Marshall. For services to British commercial interests in France.
- Ronald Bruce Martin. For services to the British community in Buenos Aires.
- Raymond John Mears. For services to British commercial interests and the British community in Abu Dhabi.
- Walter Edward Moss, Regional Director, British Council, São Paulo.
- Roderick Leese Mullan. For services to British commercial interests and the British community in Tokyo.
- John Meiklejohn Munro. For services to the development of cotton production in Ecuador.
- Dr Edward Hamilton Paterson. For medical and welfare services to the community in Hong Kong.
- Duncan McCunn Reid, M.B.E., lately Honorary British Vice-Consul, Puerto Plata, Dominican Republic.
- Donald Reginald Roberts, M.V.O., lately First Secretary (Administration), H.M. Embassy, Madrid.
- Dr John Milton Digby Roberts, Senior Specialist, Ministry of Health, Kenya.
- George Norman Stansfield, lately H.M. Consul (Commercial), British Consulate-General, Durban.
- John George Stean, Director of Building Development, Hong Kong.
- Gordon Stewart. For services to ex-Servicemen in Dublin.
- Frederick Morphet Watson, Q.F.S.M., Director of Fire Services, Hong Kong.
- Alexander William White. For services to the development of fisheries in Sudan.
- Esmond Alexander Willoughby, Q.P.M., Commissioner of Police, Belize.
- William Craig Wilson. For services to British commercial interests in Venezuela.
- Ramsay Albert William Wright, M.B.E., lately First Secretary (Administration), H.M. Embassy, Tehran.
- Keith Alexander James Younger, Principal, Agricultural College, Lesotho.

===== State of New South Wales =====
- Robert Edward Joseph Allman, of Frankston, Victoria. For service to opera.
- Miss Julie Anthony (Mrs E. Natt), of Church Point. For service to the entertainment industry.
- Professor Manuel James Aroney, of South Coogee. For service to the community.
- Bruce Bertram Burns, of Balgowlah. For service to dentistry.
- Cecil Auld Churm, of Connel's Point. For services to libraries.
- Miss Aline Mary Fenwick, of Double Bay. For service to the community.
- Laurence Graham Harrison, J.P., of Cremorne Point. For service to industry and commerce.
- John William McNamara, of Mosman. For service to medicine.
- Barbara May, Mrs McNulty, of Wahroonga. For service to education.
- Hilary Hans Pryer, of Bellevue Hill. For service to the community.
- Alexander Walter Young, of Belmont. For service to commerce and industry.

===== State of Victoria =====
- James Raymond Andrews, of Burwood. For public service.
- Desmond Dudley Cooper, of Nunawading. For service to the Victorian dairy industry.
- John Disney Graham Pagan, M.B.E., of Brighton. For municipal service.
- John Alastair Hepburn, of Glen Iris. For public service.
- Norman Sidney Johnson, of East Kevv. For service to the scout movement.
- Patrick Sellar Lang, of Lismore. For service to primary industry.
- Miss Margaret McClelland, of East Melbourne. For service to medicine.
- Stanley Franklin Newman, of Toorak. For service to industry and technical education.
- Gordon Walgrave Trinca, of Toorak. For service to road safety.
- Robert George Chisholm, of Sandringham. For services to local government and skiing.
- Alfred Ernest Clark, of Mount Eliza. For service to underprivileged children.
- Miss Patricia Cosh, of Hawthorn. For service to physiotherapy.
- Councillor Arnold Thomas Coulston, of Tangambalanga. For municipal service.
- Archibald Malcolm Galt, J.P.; of Via Wunghnu. For municipal service.
- Captain Gerhard Heinrich Heyen, of Mentone. For service to the Melbourne Maritime Museum.
- Frank Maxwell Kelly, of Colac. For municipal service.
- Thomas Edward Kilburn, of Glen Waverley. For service to youth organisations.
- Francis Alexander McIntyre, of Hamilton. For municipal service.
- Edward John Millett, of Ballarat. For service to the Science Museum of Victoria.
- Edward Stuart Morris, of Burwood. For service to retired persons.
- Osbert James Ramage, of Violet Town. For municipal service.
- Miss Suzanne Magdalene Steele (Mrs S.M. Page), of Elsternwick. For service to the arts.
- David Swift, of Ivanhoe. For public service.
- Lawrence Eugene Warner, of Ivanhoe. For service to music.
- Leslie John Westacott, of Highton. For services to the community and medicine.

===== State of Queensland =====
- Keith Alexander Esdale, E.D., of Broadbeach. For services to the banking profession.
- Robert Francis Bowden Mann, of Goondiwindi. For services to the community.
- Councillor George William Roberts, of Murgon. For services to local government and the community.
- John Boyd Rutherford, of Southport. For service as a Stipendiary Magistrate.
- Hercules Vincent Sinnamon, of Oxley. For services to youth and the community.
- The Reverend John Edward White, of Ipswich. For services to the Baptist Church.
- George Kenneth Alley, of Gordonvale. For services to the community.
- Miss Nora Baird, of Newmarket. For her contribution to music.
- Brian John Cahill, of New Farm. For his contribution to radio and television news and for community service.
- Mervyn Alwyn Collom, of Nundah. For services to his profession of chartered accountant and the community.
- Rowland Chalmers Jameson, of Charleville. For his contribution to the sheepbreeding industry.
- Evan George Keating, of Kilkivan. For community service.
- The Reverend Patrick Vincent Kenny, of Gympie. For services to the community.
- John Alan Henderson Leeds, of via Charleville. For community service.
- Getano Belford Lui, of Yam Island. For welfare activities in the interests of the Torres Strait people.
- Councillor Basil Mervyn McLellan, of Bundaberg. For local authority and community service.
- Gustav Ernest Muller, of Mackay. For services to the Sugar industry and community.

===== State of South Australia =====
- Ivor Jeffrey Ball, of Prospect. For public service.
- Ronald John Fitch, J.P., of Novar Gardens. For services to railways and the community.

===== State of Western Australia =====
- Ernest Clark, of Cannington. For services to the community.
- James Drummond Clarkson, of Peppermint Grove. For services in Hospital Administration.
- Bruce Athol Goodheart, of Applecross. For his contribution to the State's 150th Anniversary Celebrations and to hockey.
- Donald Eric Langoulant, of Attadale, Chairman, Parmelia Race Management Committee (150th Anniversary).
- Wilfred Dennis Marr, of Carnarvon. For services to the plantation industry.
- James Alan Richards, of Sorrento, Chairman of the Western Australia Week Council (150th Anniversary).

==== Member of the Order of the British Empire (MBE) ====
This section fails to include Victorians awarded the MBE - See the listing in the Victorian Gov't Gazette No 2 of 4 January 1980. From a cursory examination of this Wikipedia page, I believe the names of Victorians have been included, incorrectly, in the listing above for OBE.

Military Division

- Lieutenant Commander Leslie Cave, Royal Navy.
- Acting Lieutenant Commander Peter Alfred Clendining, Royal Navy.
- Lieutenant Commander William John Matthew Coles, Royal Navy.
- Fleet Chief Communications Yeoman George Duncan.
- Lieutenant Commander Peter Hugh Dunn, Royal Navy.
- Lieutenant Commander Robert James Fidler, Royal Navy.
- Surgeon Lieutenant Ian Franklin Geraghty, Royal Navy.
- Lieutenant Commander Anthony James Harding, Royal Navy.
- Lieutenant Commander Reginald Cecil Harper, Royal Navy.
- Acting Lieutenant Commander Henry Anthony Harris, Royal Navy.
- Fleet Chief Weapon Engineering Mechanic Frederick Arthur Holberry.
- Lieutenant Commander Robert Dudley Lilly, Royal Navy.
- Lieutenant Richard John Lippiett, Royal Navy.
- Second Officer Edna Marian Miles, R.D., W.R.N.R.
- Surgeon Lieutenant Commander Thomas Pace, Royal Navy. I
- Lieutenant Commander John Passmore, Royal Navy.
- Captain David Lachlan Ross, Royal Marines.
- Major Thomas William Beard, The Worcestershire and Sherwood Foresters Regiment (29th/45th Foot), Territorial Army.
- Captain John Bennett, Royal Army Ordnance Corps.
- Major David Anthony Beveridge, The Queen's Regiment.
- Major (Quartermaster) Theodore Louis Brown, Intelligence Corps.
- Major (Garrison Engineer) Wilfred Alexander George Carter, Corps of Royal Engineers.
- Major Geoffrey Chadwick, Royal Army Educational Corps.
- Major Brian Desmond Cheley, Corps of Royal Electrical and Mechanical Engineers (Now R.A.R.O.).
- Major Ronald George Cockings, Royal Corps of Transport.
- Major James Patrick Bernard Condon, The Royal Irish Rangers (27th (Inniskilling) 83rd and 87th).
- Major (Quartermaster) Patrick Cooper, The Queen's Own Hussars.
- Major Isaac Forbes Hamilton Cousins, Ulster Defence Regiment.
- Lieutenant Alun John Davies, Corps of Royal Engineers.
- Major Christopher Barren Dawson, Royal Regiment of Artillery.
- Reverend Victor Dobbin, Chaplain to the Forces Third Class, Royal Army Chaplains' Department.
- Warrant Officer Class 2 Harold William Nevvnham Fynn, Intelligence Corps.
- Warrant Officer Class 2 Sidney Paul Hardman, Royal Corps of Transport.
- Major (Electrical Mechanical Assistant Engineer) Christopher Hoatson, Corps of Royal Electrical and Mechanical Engineers.
- Major (Quartermaster) John Wilson Kewley, The King's Own Royal Border Regiment.
- Warrant Officer Class 2 John Laing, Royal Regiment of Artillery.
- Major David Michael Peirse Lowe, Royal Regiment of Artillery.
- Major (Brevet Lieutenant Colonel) Dennis Brian Martin, T.D., Corps of Royal Engineers, Territorial Army.
- Major Christopher Peter Matthews, Royal Army Ordnance Corps.
- Major (Quartermaster) Ronald Edward Brannan Morris, The Queen's Regiment.
- Warrant Officer Class 1 Frank Pearce, The Cheshire Regiment.
- Major Nigel Roy Mitton Petrie, The Light Infantry.
- Warrant Officer Class 1 Emlyn Lewis Pridham, Welsh Guards.
- Captain (Brevet Major) Albert John James Pryce-Howells, T.D., Royal Army Medical Corps, Territorial Army.
- Major Paul Revell, Corps of Royal Electrical and Mechanical Engineers.
- Major (Quartermaster) Edwin Joseph Roy Rose, Coldstream Guards.
- Warrant Officer Class 2 James Matthew Ross, Small Arms School Corps.
- Major Martin William Scrase, The Queen's Lancashire Regiment.
- Major Christopher George Poussett Snowden, Royal Tank Regiment.
- Major (Electrical Mechanical Assistant Engineer) George Franz Southon, Corps of Royal Electrical and Mechanical Engineers (Now R.A.R.O.).
- Major (Brevet Lieuatenant Colonel) John Martin Steele, T.D., Royal Regiment of Artillery, Territorial Army.
- Warrant Officer Class 2 (Acting Warrant Officer Class 1), Joseph Thomas Stoddart, Corps of Royal Engineers.
- Major Eric Tait, Corps of Royal Engineers.
- Major Timothy William Terry, Royal Tank Regiment.
- Major John Austin Thorp, Corps of Royal Engineers.
- Warrant Officer Class 2 Barry Edward Till, Royal Regiment of Artillery.
- Major (Quartermaster) Fitzgerald Webb, The Queen's Regiment, Territorial Army (Now Retired).
- Captain (Acting) Ernest Frederick Williamson, Army Cadet Force, Territorial Army.
- Major Peter Huntly Williamson, The Royal Anglian Regiment.
- Squadron Leader Peter Thomas Baker, Royal Air Force.
- Squadron Leader John Andrew Keith Edwards, Royal Air Force Regiment.
- Squadron Leader William Frank Floydd, B.E.M., Royal Air Force.
- Squadron Leader Sidney Arthur Edward Forrest, Royal Air Force (Retired).
- Squadron Leader Michael William Tingle, Royal Air Force.
- Squadron Leader Wouter Van Warmelo, Royal Air Force.
- Squadron Leader Peter John West, Royal Air Force.
- Acting Squadron Leader David Dinmore Royal Air Force.
- Flight Lieutenant John Douglas Christison, Royal Air Force.
- Flight Lieutenant Frederick Hindley, Royal Air Force.
- Flight Lieutenant Charles John Finn-Kelcey, Royal Air Force.
- Flight Lieutenant Edward Dudley Mee, Royal Air Force.
- Acting Flight Lieutenant Francis Peter Le Dug, Royal Air Force Volunteer Reserve (Training Branch).
- Warrant Officer Philip Henry Banks, Royal Air Force.
- Warrant Officer Peter Brennan, Royal Air Force.
- Warrant Officer Basil Golightly, Royal Air Force.
- Warrant Officer Derek Goodwin, Royal Air Force.
- Warrant Officer John Oliver Jones, Royal Air Force.
- Warrant Officer John Michael Lecun, Royal Air Force.
- Warrant Officer Kenneth Lindsay, Royal Air Force.
- Warrant Officer Roy Mecklenburgh, Royal Air Force.
- Warrant Officer John Richard Brian Montgomery, Royal Air Force.
- Warrant Officer Joseph Walklett, Royal Air Force.
- Master Pilot Walter Edward Scott, Royal Air Force.

Civil Division

- Audrey Dorothy, Mrs Allan, Consular Clerk, British High Commission, New Delhi.
- Michael Hampson Baugh, lately Training Officer, Police Training College, Botswana.
- Athalie, Mrs Beecher. For nursing and welfare services to the community in Nairobi.
- Marjory Isobel, Mrs Blacklock, Vice-Consul, British Consulate-General, Munich.
- Dr Alan Estcourt Boucher. For services to the teaching of English in Iceland.
- Colin Edward Brown, Honorary British Consul, Managua, Nicaragua.
- Robert Thomas Marshall Burr, lately Attaché, British High Commission, Gaborone.
- Miss Margaret Cassidy. For nursing and welfare services to the community in Kalimpong, India.
- Howard Robert Acheson Chamberlain, Chief Engineer, Port Works Division, Hong Kong.
- George Walter Woodward Charlton, Second Secretary (Administration) H.M. Embassy, The Hague.
- Kim-ming Chow, Liaison Officer Class I, Mutual Aid Committee Task Force, Hong Kong.
- Gerald Arthur Clode, Vice-Consul (Information), British Consulate-General, Marseilles.
- Robert Frank Christopher Davies, Pro-Consul, British Consulate-General, Rio de Janeiro.
- Miss Margaret Freda Marjorie Dodd. For services to British Commercial interests in Tehran.
- Miss Antonia Margaret Mary Doyle, lately Head of Index Unit, NATO International Staff Brussels.
- Luis Alberto Espat. For services to the community in Belize.
- Anthony Fayle, First Secretary (Consular), British High Commission, Dacca.
- Malvin Lanswell Flax, District Officer, Virgin Gorda, British Virgin Islands.
- Ian Frost. For veterinary and animal husbandry services in the Seychelles.
- Michael Alexander Gedeon, Cashier, H.M. Embassy, Cairo.
- Thomas Leslie Green. For services to education in Sierra Leone.
- Matthew Benjamin Greenhalgh, Assistant Archivist, British High Commission, Nairobi.
- David Arthur Cyril Hallett, Vice-Consul, British Consulate, Guatemala City.
- Stanley Frederick Hedges, lately Administrative Officer, British Council, Iran.
- Allan Hobbs, Second Secretary, H.M. Embassy, Moscow.
- John Edmond Howell. For services to the community in Nevis, St Kitts-Nevis-Anguilla.
- Miss Margaret Blair Johnston, lately Administrative Officer, United Nations Languages Division, Geneva.
- Miss Williamina Margaret Joss, Chief Executive Assistant, Police Department, Hong Kong.
- Dr Neil Reginald Kemp, lately Assistant Regional Education Adviser, British Council, Calcutta.
- Horace Raymond Knight, Assistant Commissioner for Labour, Hong Kong.
- Anthony Gordon Brooke Lacey, Chief Financial Administrator, Government of Botswana.
- Pauline Hilda Belmont, Mrs Latimer. For welfare services to the community in Mauritius.
- Doris Louise, Mrs Leslie. For services to the community in Belize.
- Miss Kathleen McDermott. For nursing services to the community in Malaita, Solomon Islands.
- Miss Mary Ann Pearl McLean, Personal Assistant, British Consulate-General, Montreal.
- William Allen McLaughlin. For public services in the Cayman Islands.
- Beryl Amethyst Irene, Mrs Manget. For services to education in Bermuda.
- Arthur Richard Mitchell. For services to the community in Bangladesh.
- Stanley Riddle Moir, Q.P.M., C.P.M., Assistant Commissioner of Police, Bahamas.
- Philip Henry Monypenny. For services to the British community in Chile.
- Huseyin Osman, Vice-Consul, H.M. Embassy, Ankara.
- Gwynant Owen, Administrative Secretary, British Residency, New Hebrides Condominium.
- Miss Jean Margaret Plumbe. For services to English education in Tehran.
- William Innes Rae, lately Second Secretary (Commercial), H.M. Embassy, Jedda.
- Ernest Riddiough. For public services in Ascension Island.
- William Henry James Rodriguez, Mails Superintendent, Postal Service, Gibraltar.
- June Farquhar, Mrs Schmiderer, Commercial Assistant, H.M. Embassy, Vienna.
- David Colin Stanley. For services to British commercial interests in Laos.
- Maria Carmen, Mrs Summerfield. For public services in Gibraltar.
- Barry Langley Weightman, Director of Agriculture and Rural Development, New Hebrides Condominium.
- Fraser Andrew Wilson, Administration Officer, Mirimba, Salisbury.

===== State of New South Wales =====
- Larry John Corowa, of Drummoyne. For service to sport.
- Keith Alfred Coulton, of North Star. For service to agriculture.
- Miss Edith May Cox, of Elizabeth Bay. For service to the community.
- Cecil Milton Crealy, of Woollahra. For service to the motor industry.
- The Reverend Brother John Borgia Duffy, of Wahroonga. For service to religion and education.
- Raymond Ambrose Farrelly, of Bondi. For service to local government and the community.
- Donald Ross Ferguson, of Bondi. For service to sport.
- The Venerable Robert Gordon Fillingham, of West Pennant Hills. For service to religion.
- Albert Richard Gardener, of Sans Souci. For service to sport and youth.
- George Hanna, of Murwillumbah. For service to the building industry and the community.
- Kenneth Jackman Hiscoe, of Vaucluse. For service to sport.
- Beryl Elizabeth, Mrs Ingold, of Via Gundagai. For service to agriculture and the community.
- Sheila, Mrs Lazzarini, of Guildford. For service to the community.
- Malcolm Rex Leyland, of Adamstown Heights. For service to the film industry.
- Michael James Leyland, of Toronto. For service to the film industry.
- Kevin Joseph Lynch, of Newport. For service to the community.
- Kenneth Shipton McMorrine, of Condell Park. For service to the community.
- William John O'Brien, of Vaucluse. For service to sport.
- Gary Bernard O'Callaghan, of Turramurra. For service to broadcasting and the community.
- Walter Lyall Rowe, of Pymble. For service to journalism.
- Sister Josephine Florence Walsh (Sister Mary Fabian), of Tempe. For service to religion and the ethnic community.
- Shui Ling Wong (Stanley Wong), of South Maroubra. For service to the ethnic community.

===== State of Western Australia =====
- Maxwell Arthur Bostock, of City Beach. For his contribution to the 150th Anniversary Celebrations.
- Douglas Joseph Burton, of Karrinyup. For services in the field of photo-journalism.
- Kenneth Colbung, of Nollamara. For services to the Aboriginal community.
- Kenneth Arthur Dickson, of City Beach, Chairman, Industry Committee of the 150th Anniversary Board.
- Jennifer Ann Selby, Mrs Hardie, of South Hedland. For services to the community.
- Frederick Samuel Theodore Haywood, J.P., of Woodlands. For services to surf life saving and the community.
- Glen Valentine Mitchell, of Donnybrook. For services to the community.
- Harry Michael Noonan, of Nedlands. For services to ex-servicemen's organisations.
- Gilbert Murray Ralph, of Claremont, Chairman, Arts and Entertainment Committee of the 150th Anniversary Board.
- Harry William Sorensen, of Melville, Chairman, Commerce Committee (150th Anniversary).

=== Imperial Service Order (ISO) ===
==== Home Civil Service ====
- Harry John Challen, lately Chief Auditor, Exchequer and Audit Department.
- James Reid Cowie, lately Sheriff Clerk (Principal Grade), Scottish Courts Administration.
- Kenneth Christopher Cudby, Senior Principal, Department of Health and Social Security.
- Ronald Albert Dale, Principal Scientific Officer, Health and Safety Executive, Department of Employment.
- William Good Dry, T.D., Principal, Manpower Services Commission, Department of Employment.
- Trevor Elliott, First Class Valuer, Board of Inland Revenue.
- John Edwin Field, Principal Scientific Officer, National Engineering Laboratory.
- William Douglas Godson, lately Superintending Building Surveyor, Property Services Agency, Department of the Environment.
- Frederick James Hagell, lately Senior Principal, Ministry of Defence.
- Henderson Harding, Inspector S.P., Board of Inland Revenue.
- John Roland Hards, Principal, Overseas Development Administration.
- Arthur Egerton Harrison, Principal, Department of Health and Social Security.
- Miss Mildred Mary Howley, Principal, Department of Transport.
- Leopold Alfred Jimenez, Senior Principal, Home Office.
- Urian Johnston, Principal, British Museum Natural History.
- Hubert Richard John Morris, Senior Inspector of Taxes, Board of Inland Revenue.
- Philip William Nunn, lately Official Receiver (B), Insolvency Service, Department of Trade.
- Royston David Perry, Foreign and Commonwealth Office.
- Victor Horace Reeves, General Secretary, Civil Service Sports Council.
- Peter John Ross, Principal Scientific Officer, Ministry of Defence.
- William George Shannon, Principal, Loughry College of Agriculture and Food Technology, Northern Ireland.
- Bernard Charles Simpson, Principal, Ministry of Defence.
- Graham Hibbens Spink, Principal Professional and Technology Officer, Ministry of Defence.
- James Watchorn, Professional and Technology Superintending Officer, Ministry of Defence.
- Thomas Ellis Wathan, Divisional Agricultural Officer Grade I, Ministry of Agriculture, Fisheries and Food.

==== Diplomatic and Overseas List ====
- Royson Vaughan Lindsay Hatton, Assistant Commissioner, Customs and Excise Service, Hong Kong.
- John Dudley Romer, M.B.E., Senior Pest Control Officer, Urban Services Department, Hong Kong.
- Alan Harley Wilkins, Mass Transit Adviser, Public Works Department, Hong Kong.

==== State of New South Wales ====
- John Lewis Henry, Commissioner of the Forestry Commission of New South Wales.
- Gordon Mackenzie Maxwell, D.C.M., Under Secretary, New South Wales Department of Mines.

==== State of Queensland ====
- William John White, of Enoggera, lately Permanent Head of the Department of Justice.

==== State of Western Australia ====
- Oliver Francis Dixon, of Peppermint Grove, Parliamentary Commissioner for Administrative Investigations.
- David Mossenson, of Mount Lawley, as Director-General of Education and for his contribution to the 150th Anniversary Celebrations.

=== British Empire Medal (BEM) ===
Military Division

- Chief Petty Officer (SEA) Michael George Ackford.
- Acting Corporal Paul Adrian Ballingall, Royal Marines.
- Chief Marine Engineering Mechanic (L) Arthur William Bartle.
- Marine Engineering Mechanician (P)l Alan Stanley Brown.
- Chief Petty Officer Stores Accountant George Fraser Buchan.
- Marine David Edward William Clifton, Royal Marines.
- Weapons Engineering Mechanician 1 Albert Clyde.
- Chief Weapons Engineering Mechanician Reginald Arthur Cook.
- Chief Communications Yeoman Raymond John Cotton, Royal Naval Reserve.
- Chief Petty Officer Coxswain Edward Dawson.
- Aircraft Artificer (AE)1 John Dayton.
- Chief Petty Officer (OPS)(S)(SM) John Thomas George Harvey.
- Chief Weapons Engineering Artificer Norman Charles Hill.
- Chief Petty Officer Stores Accountant Leslie John Howell, Royal Naval Reserve.
- Steward Richard Kennedy Janssens.
- Colour Sergeant David Leonard Jones, Royal Marines.
- Marine Engineering Artificer 1 (H) Michael Albert Keir.
- Petty Officer Medical Assistant John Jackson Knowles.
- Chief Petty Officer Cook Brian Lawson.
- Chief Petty Officer Stores Accountant Robert Charles Marshall.
- Chief Petty Officer Airman (SE) Richard Martinson.
- Chief Wren Writer Linda Ollivant.
- Radio Electrician Artificer (Air) John Radford Purdy.
- Chief Weapons Electrical Mechanic (O) Raymond John Summers, Royal Naval Reserve.
- Colour Sergeant Hugh William Walker, Royal Marines.
- Chief Petty Officer Physical Trainer Robert Smith Wilkins.
- Staff Sergeant William Adams, Royal Corps of Signals.
- Staff Sergeant (Acting Warrant Officer Class 2) Graham John Archer, Royal Army Medical Corps.
- Sergeant David Ralph Armstrong, Intelligence Corps.
- Staff Sergeant Anthony John Arnold, Royal Regiment of Artillery.
- Sergeant Edward Cavan William Ayris, Royal Corps of Transport.
- Sergeant Dennis Victor Baker, The Worcestershire and Sherwood Foresters Regiment (29th/45th Foot) (Now Discharged).
- Sergeant Melvin Llewellyn Blake, The Royal Regiment of Wales (24th/41st Foot).
- Staff Sergeant John James Boyle, Royal Regiment of Artillery.
- Lance Sergeant John Colin Brown, Grenadier Guards.
- Sergeant Charles Anthony Byles, Irish Guards.
- Bombardier (Acting Sergeant) John Malcolm Campbell, Royal Regiment of Artillery.
- Staff Sergeant Chandrakumar Basnet, 2nd King Edward VII's Own Gurkha Rifles (The Sirmoor Rifles).
- Staff Sergeant George Clarke, Mercian Volunteers, Territorial Army.
- Sergeant George Henry Collins, The Royal Welch Fusiliers, Territorial Army.
- Staff Sergeant Archibald Bonnar Colville, The Gordon Highlanders.
- Staff Sergeant (Acting Warrant Officer Class 2) John Michael Greaser, Special Air Service Regiment.
- Sergeant Brian Gaw Dalzell, Royal Regiment of Artillery.
- Staff Sergeant Alan Davies, Corps of Royal Electrical and Mechanical Engineers.
- Sergeant Alan Cameron Davies, Royal Army Medical Corps.
- Bombardier Henry Bramwell Dodds, Royal Regiment of Artillery.
- Corporal Michael Philip Dodge, Corps of Royal Electrical and Mechanical Engineers.
- Sergeant (Acting Staff Sergeant) Ian Fryer, Royal Army Pay Corps.
- Staff Sergeant David Hirst Gridley, The Royal Anglian Regiment.
- Sergeant Martin Shields Harper, The Royal Irish Rangers (27th (Inniskilling) 83rd and 87th).
- Staff Sergeant William Alfred Hicks, Royal Army Ordnance Corps.
- Corporal David John Hilborn, Royal Army Ordnance Corps.
- Staff Sergeant James Charles Hosie, Corps of Royal Electrical and Mechanical Engineers.
- Sergeant Barry John Humphrey, Royal Army Ordnance Corps.
- Corporal Bryan Walker Johnson, The Queen's Own Mercian Yeomanry, Territorial Army.
- Staff Sergeant Gerald Kelly, The Royal Irish Rangers (27th (Inniskilling) 83rd and 87th).
- Staff Sergeant James Lannie, Royal Corps of Transport, Territorial Army.
- Sergeant (Acting Warrant Officer Class 2), David John Lee, Royal Regiment of Artillery.
- Corporal David Lefebvre, Royal Army Pay Corps, Territorial Army.
- Staff Sergeant James Albert Le Feuvre, Royal Regiment of Artillery, Territorial Army.
- Sergeant Terence Mann, Grenadier Guards.
- Corporal Mohan-Sing Gurung, 6th Queen Elizabeth's Own Gurkha Riffes.
- Sergeant Narbahadur Thapa, 6th Queen Elizabeth's Own Gurkha Rifles.
- Staff Sergeant Bernard John Newland, Corps of Royal Engineers, Territorial Army.
- HK/Staff Sergeant Ping Ching Ng, Hong Kong Military Service Corps.
- Staff Sergeant Dennis Clive Oldfield, Royal Army Ordnance Corps.
- Staff Sergeant Peter O'Reilly, The King's Regiment.
- Staff Sergeant David Frank Osguthorpe, Corps of Royal Engineers.
- Staff Sergeant William Woodhouse Redmond, The iRoyal1 Yeomanry, Territorial Army.
- Staff Sergeant John Richard Reed, Special Air Service Regiment, Territorial Army.
- Sergeant Christopher Anthony Rennie, Corps of Royal Engineers.
- Staff Sergeant Robert John Roberts, Corps of Royal Engineers.
- Staff Sergeant (Local Warrant Officer Class 2) Brian David Sanders, Corps of Royal Engineers.
- Sergeant William Samuel Sheridan, Corps of Royal Military Police.
- Bombardier David Ivan Smylie, Royal Regiment of Artillery, Territorial Army.
- Staff Sergeant Graham Bernard Sutherland, The Queen's Own Hussars.
- Staff Sergeant Alexander Jackson Symons, Royal Army Ordnance Corps.
- Staff Sergeant Leonard John Taylor, Corps of Royal Engineers.
- Sergeant Michael John Telling, Royal Army Ordnance Corps.
- Sergeant John James Thompson, Royal Corps of Signals.
- Staff Sergeant Joseph Tidmarsh, Royal Army Ordnance Corps.
- Staff Corporal John Triggs, The Blues and Royals (Royal Horse Guards and 1st Dragoons).
- Sergeant Roy Barrington Vockins, Corps of Royal Military Police.
- Sergeant Kenneth Frank Watkins, The Royal Regiment of Wales (24th/41st Foot).
- Staff Sergeant Michael Edward Wellings, Royal Regiment of Artillery.
- Staff Sergeant Alan William Wildman, Royal Pioneer Corps.
- Acting Warrant Officer Dennis Charles Sprake, Royal Auxiliary Air Force.
- Flight Sergeant (now Warrant Officer) Keith Stuart Boast, Royal Air Force.
- Flight Sergeant (now Warrant Officer) Frederick Alec Bunting, Royal Air Force.
- Flight Sergeant Edmund Dearsley, Royal Air Force.
- Flight Sergeant Michael Alan Gunney, Royal Air Force.
- Flight Sergeant Alan James Harby, Royal Air Force.
- Flight Sergeant Anthony Leonard, Royal Air Force.
- Flight Sergeant Harold Horace Leslie Miller, Royal Air Force.
- Flight Sergeant Edward James Milne, Royal Air Force.
- Flight Sergeant Arthur Mitchell, Royal Air Force.
- Flight Sergeant John Edward Reuben Rockett, Royal Air Force.
- Flight Sergeant Frank Grindlay Shedden, Royal Air Force.
- Flight Sergeant Reginald John Welch, Royal Air Force.
- Acting Flight Sergeant James Craig, Royal Air Force.
- Acting Flight Sergeant John Edwin Veal, Royal Air Force.
- Chief Technician Leslie Gray, Royal Air Force.
- Chief Technician Robert Samuel Porter, Royal Air Force.
- Chief Technician David Tallentire, Royal Air Force.
- Sergeant John Donald Goupillot, Royal Air Force.
- Sergeant John James Hunter, Royal Air Force.
- Sergeant Anthony Robert Jewell, Royal Air Force.
- Sergeant Robert Henry Lacy, Royal Air Force.
- Sergeant John Allan Peat, Royal Air Force.
- Sergeant Gordon Dick Sidey, Royal Air Force.

Civil Division

- Philimoni Batiweti. For services to the community in the New Hebrides Condominium.
- Chan, Kwok-ki, Technician, Agriculture and Fisheries Department, Hong Kong.
- Chan Lo, Mrs Anna In-on, Assistant, Housing Department, Hong Kong.
- Miss Ho, Scarlett Siu-lan, Confidential Assistant, Textile Controls Division, Commerce and Industry Department, Hong Kong.
- Isaac Douglas Hudson, Senior Public Health Inspector, Public Health Department, St Helena.
- Li, Hong, C.P.M., Station Sergeant, Royal Hong Kong Police Force.
- May, Mrs Maddocks. For services to the community in the Falkland Islands.
- Cyril Sage. For public services in St Kitts-Nevis-Anguilla.
- Miss Kay Williams. For services to the community in the New Hebrides Condominium.

==== State of New South Wales ====
- Arthur Kingsley Adams, of Fairfield. For service to cycling and the community.
- Denes Adrigan, of Emu Plains. For service to sport.
- Marjorie Victoria, Mrs Arnold, of Lawson. For service to the community.
- Victor William Bayliss, of Bathurst. For service to the community.
- Giulia, Mrs Bonacina, of Dapto. For service to the ethnic community.
- Miss Laura Margaret Chaffey, of Ruscutters Bay. For service to nursing.
- David Major Cody, of Forestville. For service to the State.
- Vera, Mrs Cox, of Five Dock. For service to the community.
- Ms Winsome Evans, of Sydney. For service to music.
- Neville Weston Galton, of Roseville. For service to the community.
- Miss Beatrice Emma Foster Gerdes, of Drummoyne. For service to the community.
- Karel Joseph Koenig, of North Sydney. For service to the community..
- Chris, Mrs Mcconnell, of Merewether. For service to the community.
- Elsie Ameliai Mrs McLean, of Belmore. For service to the community.
- Edward Ryan Marshall, of Thirroul. For service to sport and the community.
- Ian Wylie Milbank, of Elizabeth Bay. For service to the community.
- Ida Charlotte Eliza, Mrs Miller, of Kogarah. For service to the community.
- Edith Constance, Mrs Murray, of Springwood. For service to the theatre and youth.
- Ruby Lynette, Mrs Neate, of Coonabarabran. For service to the community.
- Clara Elena, Mrs Norman, of Woollahra. For service to ethnic communities.
- Miss Hazel Majella O'Connor, of Glebe Point. For service to the State.
- Lesley Florence, Mrs Onslow, of Taree. For service to the community.
- Adele Hamilton, Mrs Patterson, of Coffs Harbour. For service to the community.
- Mary Evelyn, Mrs Pepperall, of Wickham. For service to the community.
- Kathleen Violet, Mrs Randall, of Bowral. For service to the community.
- Mary Elizabeth, Mrs Rogers, of Bega. For service to the community.
- Elizabeth Anne, Mrs Search, of Normanhurst. For service to education.
- Ronald William Sharp, of Mortdale. For service to music.
- Russell George Smith, of Lugarno. For service to the community.
- Anne, Mrs Godfrey-Smith, of Narrabundah. For service to the theatre.
- Clyde Ernest Stiff, of Wombeyan Caves. For service to the State.
- Reginald Thomas Ward, of Bondi Beach. For service to the community.
- Gladys Eileen, Mrs Willis, of Merrylands. For service to the community.
- Walter Harold Leslie White, of Tumut. For service to the community.
- Rifat Yaka, of East Lakes. For service to the ethnic community.

==== State of Victoria ====
- Miss Marjorie Adelaide Andrews, of Elwood. For community service.
- Albert Edward Boucher, of Bairnsdale. For community service.
- Florence Veronica, Mrs Canavan, of North Balwyn. For community service.
- William Martin Comer, of Elmore. For community service.
- Arthur James Cowley, of East Wandin. For service to youth sporting organisations.
- Kathleen Alder, Mrs Dickie, of Glenthompson. For community service.
- Keith Reginald Filbay, of Leopold. For service to rural fire brigades and the community.
- Miss Annie Boyd Gemmell, of Albert Park. For community service.
- Patricia Ada Rose, Mrs Griffiths, of Sale. For service to disabled persons.
- John Norval Gutierrez, of Brighton. For service to youth sailing.
- Robert Charles Hayes, of Thornbury. For service to ex-servicemen's organisations.
- Eva Jean, Mrs Hughes, of Stawell. For community service.
- William Antonio Jennings, of Bendigo. For service to the meat industry.
- Roy Edward Lane, of Bairnsdale. For community service.
- Betty, Mrs Lipton, of Balaclava. For service to elderly citizens.
- Donald Percival Maguire, of Borovia. For service to rural fire brigades.
- Claudine Marie Stuart, Mrs Matheson, of Black Rocks. For community service.
- Miss Nell McLarty, of South Melbourne. For service to women's cricket.
- Beatty Edith, Mrs McLean, of Healesville. For community service.
- Jean Marian, Mrs McLean, of Swan Hill. For service to the Presbyterian and Uniting Church.
- Jessica, Mrs Millott, of Black Rock. For community service.
- Eugene Richard Gerrard Shalders, of Yarra Junction. For community service.
- Bruce Roy Taylor, of Sorrento. For emergency services.

==== State of Queensland ====
- Jessie May, Mrs Blue, of Kingaroy. For services to the community.
- William Nils Buchanan, of Via Gympie. For services to the community.
- Gordon Hoskins Byrne, of Thargomindah. For services to the community.
- Allan Banks Carvosso, of Dalby. For services to the community.
- James Lancaster Gardiner, of Ipswich. For services to the community.
- Annie, Mrs Hansen, of Bowen. For services to the community.
- Clara Elizabeth May, Mrs Hoffman, of Guluguba. For services to the community.
- Alice Eva, Mrs Holland, of Murgon. For services to the community.
- Kevin Joseph Kelly, of Dalby. For services to the community.
- William Bell Kerr, of Camp Hill. For services to the community.
- Annie Watson, Mrs Payne, of Aramac. For services to the community.
- Friedrich Gottlieb Stephan Radke, of Bethania. For services to the care and welfare of children.
- George Soden, of Camp Hill. For services to the community.
- Frederick Norman Sorensen, of Injune. For services to the community.

==== State of Western Australia ====
- Margaret Minna, Mrs Abbotts, J.P., of Bridgetown. For services to youth.
- John Francis Anderson, of Bayswater. For services to music.
- Margaret Shirley McPhie, Mrs Atkinson, of Mosman Park. For her contribution to the 150th Anniversary Celebrations.
- Doris Olive, Mrs Della-Bosca, of Southern Cross. For service to the community.
- Grant Stephen Dorrington, of Warwick. For his contribution to the 150th Anniversary Celebrations.
- Kenneth Eastwood, of Thornlie. For his contributions to the 150th Anniversary Celebrations.
- Margaret Kerr, Mrs Franck, of West Leederville. For services to nursing.
- Dorothy Merle, Mrs Isbister, of Kalgoorlie. For her contribution to the 150th Anniversary Celebrations.
- Peter John Lockyer, of Girrawheen. Butler, Government House, Perth.
- James Louis Macaulay, of Albany. For services to sport.
- George Court Pestell, of Dianella. For services to music and the Salvation Army.
- Sarah May, Mrs Stone, of Fremantle. For services to the community.
- Albert Edward Williams, of Nedlands. For his contribution to the 150th Anniversary Celebrations.

=== Royal Red Cross ===
==== Member of the Royal Red Cross (RRC) ====
- Squadron Officer Angela Moffatt, Princess Mary's Royal Air Force Nursing Service.

==== Associate of the Royal Red Cross (ARRC) ====
- Major Margaret Sara Alexandra Ferguson, Queen Alexandra's Royal Army Nursing Corps, Territorial Army.
- Major Pamela Lena Rutherford, Queen Alexandra's Royal Army Nursing Corps.
- Major Elizabeth Margaret Smyth, Queen Alexandra's Royal Army Nursing Corps.
- Squadron Officer Grace Lorna Hawke, Princess Mary's Royal Air Force Nursing Service
- Squadron Officer Margaret Mary Ann Robb, Princess Mary's Royal Air Force Nursing Service.
- Flight Lieutenant Robert Henry Williams, Royal Air Force.

=== Air Force Cross (AFC) ===
- Lieutenant Commander Anthony Ronald Widawski Ogilvy, Royal Navy.
- Wing Commander David Cousins, Royal Air Force.
- Squadron Leader John Macquarie Every Pym, Royal Air Force.
- Squadron Leader Graeme Campbell Smith, Royal Air Force.
- Squadron Leader David John Sowler, Royal Air Force.
- Squadron Leader David John Gladstone Wilby, Royal Air Force.
- Flight Lieutenant Robert Eric Best, Royal Air Force.
- Flight Lieutenant Bruce Adrian Charles Chapple, Royal Air Force.
- Flight Lieutenant Michael Timothy Curley, Royal Air Force.
- Flight Lieutenant Malcolm Norton Sawyer, Royal Air Force.
- Flight Lieutenant Stanley John Spoor, Royal Air Force.

=== Bar to the Air Force Medal (AFM*) ===
- Flight Sergeant James Donald Robertson, A.F.M., Royal Air Force.

=== Queen's Police Medal (QPM) ===
England and Wales

- Roger Birch, Chief Constable, Warwickshire Constabulary.
- Vivian Thomas Brook, Chief Superintendent, South Wales Constabulary.
- Robert Sidney Bunyard, Chief Constable, Essex Police.
- Thomas Richard Davies, Assistant Chief Constable, North Wales Constabulary.
- Mrs Selina Gelder, Chief Inspector, Lancashire Constabulary.
- William Hadfield, Chief Superintendent, Greater Manchester Police.
- Kenneth Gilbert Hannam, Commander, Metropolitan. Police.
- Gerald Toby Charles Lambourne, Commander, Metropolitan Police.
- Frederick Ashton Maskery, Chief Superintendent, Staffordshire Police.
- George William Rushbrook, Commander, Metropolitan Police.
- John Henry Thornton, Commander, Metropolitan Police.
- James Whitehead, lately Assistant Chief Constable, Nottinghamshire Constabulary.
- Edmund Walter Whitmore, Deputy Chief Constable, Gloucestershire Constabulary.
- John Wilkinson, lately Chief Superintendent, South Yorkshire Police.
- Sir Colin Philip Joseph Woods, K.C.V.O., C.B.E., lately H.M. Chief Inspector of Constabulary.

Northern Ireland

- John Joseph Fitzsimmons, Inspector, Royal Ulster Constabulary.

Overseas Territories

- Chik-shin Cheng, C.P.M., Chief Superintendent of Police, Royal Hong Kong Police Force.
- Brian Ernest Graves, C.P.M., Commandant of Police, British Division, New Hebrides Constabulary.
- Donald Leslie Philip, C.P.M., Deputy Commissioner of Police, Royal Antigua Police Force.

State of New South Wales

- Paul Francis Clark, Superintendent, New South Wales Police Force.
- John Joseph Conaghan, Superintendent, New South Wales Police Force.
- Colin Neil Mackinnon, Superintendent, New South Wales Police Force.
- William Lindley Marcroft, Superintendent, New South Wales Police Force.
- Ralph Dudley Masters, Superintendent, New South Wales Police Force.
- Keith Robert Paull, Superintendent, New South Wales Police Force.
- Arthur Leonard Smaills, Senior Inspector, New South Wales Police Force.
- Douglas William Walker, Inspector, New South Wales Police Force.
- Norman Ross Walker, Inspector, New South Wales Police Force.

State of Victoria

- Philip Harry Bennett, Superintendent, Victoria Police Force.
- Kenneth Ernest Brown, Inspector, Victoria Police Force.
- Joseph Disher Darley, Assistant Commissioner, Victoria Police Force.
- John Walter Matthey, Senior Constable, Victoria Police Force.
- Charles Raymond Mitchell, Chief Superintendent, Victoria Police Force.
- Allen James Williams, Chief Inspector, Victoria Police Force.

State of Queensland

- Thomas Sydney Charles Atkinson, Superintendent, Queensland Police Force.
- Clarence Arnold Castledine, Superintendent Queensland Police Force.
- Andrew Michael Coyne, Sergeant 2nd Class, Queensland Police Force.
- Noel Thomas Creevey, Superintendent, Queensland Police Force.
- Neil Sylvester Harvey, Superintendent, Queensland Police Force.
- William Patrick Howley, lately Superintendent, Queensland Police Force.
- William Patrick Osborne, lately Superintendent, Queensland Police Force.

State of Western Australia

- Francis William Roy Balcombe, Assistant Commissioner (Crime), Western Australia Police Force.
- James Ralph Wilson, M.V.O., Assistant Commissioner (Operations), Western Australia Police Force.

Scotland

- George Steven, Assistant Chief Constable, Lothian and Borders Police.
- Donald Crawford Irving, Chief Superintendent, Strathclyde Police.

=== Queen's Fire Service Medal for Distinguished Service ===
England and Wales

- Alan John Archer, Chief Fire Officer, Buckinghamshire Fire Brigade.
- Ronald Alfred Bullers, Chief Fire Officer, Greater Manchester Fire Brigade.
- Thomas Frederick Elton, Chief Fire Officer, Durham Fire Brigade.
- Kenneth Harden, B.E.M., Chief Fire Officer, Gloucestershire Fire Brigade.
- Royston Herbert Edward Mason, Divisional Officer Grade I, Humberside Fire Brigade.
- Gordon John Stringer, Deputy Assistant Chief Officer, London Fire Brigade.

State of Victoria

- Ernest Joseph Bromley, Station Officer, Ballarat City Urban Fire Brigade.
- Ernest Osborne, Deputy Chief Fire Officer, Metropolitan Fire Brigade.
- Stanley Maxwell Taylor, Senior Assistant Chief Officer, Country Fire Authority of Victoria.
- Neville Edward Van Every, Chief Fire Officer, Metropolitan Fire Brigade.

=== Colonial Police Medal for Meritorious Service ===
- Maurice Albert William Brown, Chief Inspector of Police, Royal Hong Kong Police Force.
- Tat-wah Chan, Senior Inspector of Police, Royal Hong Kong Police Force.
- Wai-poon Chan, Station Sergeant of Police, Royal Hong Kong Police Force.
- Yuen-tung Chan, Police Constable, Royal Hong Kong Police Force.
- Chi-kong Cheung, Station Sergeant of Police, Royal Hong Kong Police Force.
- Major John Roland Edward Cross, Superintendent of Police, Royal Hong Kong Police Force.
- Clement McWilton Dunnah, Assistant Superintendent of Police, Royal Antigua Police Force.
- Yiu-ming Fung, Senior Inspector of Police, Royal Hong Kong Police Force.
- Thomas David Charles Gardiner, Divisional Officer, Hong Kong Fire Services.
- Peter Ernest Halliday, Superintendent of Police, Royal Hong Kong Police Force.
- Kwan-ha Li, Chief Superintendent of Police, Royal Hong Kong Police Force.
- James Gordon Murray, Divisional Officer, Hong Kong Fire Services.
- Wilfred Sebastian Ogley, Chief Inspector of Police, Royal Hong Kong Auxiliary Police Force.
- Siu-Kwai Tang, Station Sergeant of Police, Royal Hong Kong Police Force.
- Peter John Webb, Senior Superintendent of Police, Royal Hong Kong Police Force.
- John Peter Wilson, Senior Superintendent of Police, Royal Hong Kong Police Force.
- Pak-cheung Yiu, Station Sergeant of Police, Royal Hong Kong Police Force.

=== Queen's Commendation for Valuable Service in the Air ===
- Lieutenant Commander Neville Langdale Lee Featherstone, Royal Navy.
- Lieutenant Alan Lockey, Royal Navy.
- Squadron Leader Alastair McKay, Royal Air Force.
- Squadron Leader Jeffrey Morgan, Royal Air Force.
- Squadron Leader John Hugh Thompson, Royal Air Force.
- Flight Lieutenant Jeremy John Barnett, Royal Air Force.
- Flight Lieutenant William Norman Browne, Royal Air Force.
- Flight Lieutenant Dennis Cheesebrough, Royal Air Force.
- Flight Lieutenant Raymond Arthur Coates, Royal Air Force.
- Flight Lieutenant Richard Alexander Cole, Royal Air Force.
- Flight Lieutenant Colin Cullis, Royal Air Force.
- Flight Lieutenant Graham Stewart Forbes, Royal Air Force.
- Flight Lieutenant Robert John Hellyer, Royal Air Force.
- Flight Lieutenant John Patrick Holland, Royal Air Force.
- Flight Lieutenant Andrew Wallace Marrs, Royal Air Force.
- Flight Lieutenant John Roland Pintches, Royal Air Force.
- Flight Lieutenant Paul Edward Rickard, Royal Air Force.
- Flight Lieutenant Edward James Scott, Royal Air Force.
- Flight Lieutenant Roger William Searle, Royal Air Force.
- Master Navigator Anthony David Melton, Royal Air Force.
- Harold John Charles Bennett, Flight Engineering Superintendent (Flight Crew), British Airways.
- Peter Julian Ginger, lately Chief Production Test Pilot, Warton Division, British Aerospace.
- Miss Gisela Elizabeth Thurauf, Nursing Officer, Scottish Air Ambulance Service.

== Australia ==
=== Knight Bachelor ===
- Talbot Sydney Duckmanton, C.B.E., of Sydney, New South Wales. For service to broadcasting.
- Dr. Keith Stephen Jones, of Manly, New South Wales. For service to medicine and health administration.
- Alexander George William Keys, O.B.E., M.C., of Queanbeyan, New South Wales. For service to veterans.
- Richard Robert Law-Smith, C.B.E., A.F.C., of Macedon, Victoria. For service to aviation, commerce and industry.
- James Rupert Magarey, of North Adelaide, South Australia. For service to medicine and health administration.
- Nicholas Fancourt Parkinson, of Red Hill, Australian Capital Territory. For public service.
- The Honourable Justice Reginald Allfree Smithers, of Kew, Victoria. For services to law.
- David, Ronald Zeidler, C.B.E., of Canterbury, Victoria. For service to industry.

=== Order of the Bath ===
==== Companion of the Order of the Bath (CB) ====
- Francis Joseph Mahony, O.B.E, of Hughes, Australian Capital Territory. For public service,
- Bronte Clucas Quayle, O.B.E., of Deakin, Australian Capital Territory. For public service.

=== Order of Saint Michael and Saint George ===
==== Companion of the Order of St Michael and St George (CMG) ====
- The Honourable Charles Robert Kelly, of Burnside, South Australia. For parliamentary service.
- Francis Patrick McManus, of Essendon, Victoria. For parliamentary service.

=== Order of the British Empire ===
==== Dame Commander of the Order of the British Empire (DBE) ====
- Senator (Mrs.) Margaret Georgina Constance Guilfoyle, of Kew, Victoria. For public and parliamentary service.
- Raigh Edith, Mrs. Roe, C.B.E., of Kelmscott, Western Australia. For service to women.

==== Knight Commander of the Order of the British Empire (KBE) ====
Civil Division

- Harold Murray Knight, D.S.C., of Sydney, New South Wales. For service to banking.

Military Division

- Lieutenant General Donald Beaumont Dunstan, C.B., C.B.E., Chief of General Staff.

==== Commander of the Order of the British Empire (CBE) ====
- David Robert Fullerton, of Darling Point, New South Wales. For service to the community and commerce.
- Allen Rupert Guy, O.B.E., of Bendigo, Victoria. For service to the community and industry.
- Walter Laurence Hughes, of Maryborough, Queensland. For service to ship building and the Australian export industry.
- Michael George Kailis, of Perth, Western Australia. For service to the fishing industry and the Greek community.
- Miss Yvonne Minton, of Berkshire, England. For service to music.
- Francis Reginald Dorrington Morgan, of North Balwyn, Victoria. For service to the metal trades industry.
- Dr. Alan Edward Pierce, of Red Hill, Australian Capital Territory. For service to veterinary science.
- Robert Alick Robson, of Double Bay, New South Wales. For service to industry.
- Dr. Mervyn Keith Smith, of St. Georges, South Australia. For service to medicine.
- Dr. Marie Naomi Wing, O.B.E., of Waverton, New South Wales. For service to medicine in the field of rehabilitation.

==== Officer of the Order of the British Empire (OBE) ====
- Stacy Atkin, of Epping, New South Wales. For service to the Anglican Church and the sport of cricket.
- Ronald Raymond Boland, of Glenelg, South Australia. For service to journalism.
- Sol Brender, of Bellevue Hill, New South Wales. For service to commerce and community welfare (Jewry).
- Samuel Burton, of Curtin, Australian Capital Territory. For public service.
- Frederick James Church, M.B.E., of Wahroonga, New South Wales. For service to religion and the community.
- Harold George Coates, of Lithgow, New South Wales. For service to the community.
- Edward Sydney Cole, of Neutral Bay, New South Wales. For service to the rural industry and industrial relations.
- Aileen Christina, Mrs. Ekblom, of Whyalla, South Australia. For service to local government and the community.
- Miss Joan Fry, of Warramanga, Australian Capital Territory. For service to early childhood education.
- Frank Hillary Gill, of Red Cliffs, Victoria. For service to agriculture (viticulture).
- John Bernard Gough, of Toorak, Victoria. For service to industry.
- Christopher Robert Ingamells, of Westbury, Tasmania. For service to the community.
- Olwyn Gwen, Mrs. Jull, of Victoria Point, Queensland. For service to women and the Church.
- Miss Marie Beryl Kimber, of Adelaide, South Australia. For service to music.
- Robert James Linford, of Red Hill, Australian Capital Territory. For public service.
- Peter Middleton, of Picton, New South Wales. For service to architecture.
- Heather Mary, Mrs. Mitchell, of Horsham, Victoria. For service to the community.
- Professor (Mrs.) Marie Draga Neale, of Elwood, Victoria. For service to education of exceptional children.
- Vernon Thomas O'Brien, Darwin, Northern Territory. For public service.
- Dr. Vernon Douglas Plueckhahn, of Highton, Victoria. For service to pathology.
- Dr. Oscar Rivers Schmalzback, of Double Bay, New South Wales. For service to forensic medicine.
- Reginald Leslie Stock, of South Yarra, Victoria. For public service.

==== Member of the Order of the British Empire (MBE) ====
Civil Division

- Robert Russell Aitken, of Toorak, Victoria. For service to the sport of rowing.
- Paul Lynton Bagshaw, of McLaren Flat, South Australia. For service to the sport of Australian rules football.
- Vivian Walter Bennett-Wood, of Welshpool, Victoria. For service to the community.
- John Richard Blakeman, of Alice Springs, Northern Territory. For service to the community.
- John Costa Carvan, of Penrith, New South Wales. For service to the community.
- Helen May, Mrs. Cunningham, of Forrest, Australian Capital Territory. For service to women and the community.
- Marion Louise, Mrs. Disney, of Hazelwood Park, South Australia. For service to the community.
- Dennis Albert Dorricott, of Como, Western Australia. For service to disabled people.
- Miss Norma Gwendoline Ferris, of Kallista, Victoria. For service to the media.
- John Alexander Finlay, of Bourke, New South Wales. For service to the community.
- Eileen Marjory, Mrs. Fitzer, of Fannie Bay, Northern Territory. For service to health and the community.
- Robert Orr Fyfe, of East Bentleigh, Victoria. For service to the sport of badminton.
- Charles George Llewellyn Gooding, of Warragul, Victoria. For service to entomology.
- Dr. David Lindsay Graham, of Yass, New South Wales. For service to veterans and the community.
- Colin Francis Grant, of Page, Australian Capital Territory. For public service.
- Ronald James Halliday, of Parkside, South Australia. For service to the sport of cricket.
- Elizabeth May, Mrs. Hansen, of Cannington, Western Australia. For service to Aboriginal welfare.
- Hunter Chris Harrison, of Darwin, Northern Territory. For public service and service to sport.
- Lacey Morton Hurn, of Near Angaston, South Australia. For service to health and the community.
- Dr. Ronald William John Robinson James, of Wollongong, New South Wales. For service to medicine and the community.
- Roland Lindsay Johnston, of Main Arm, New South Wales. For service to primary industry and the community.
- Reginald Leo Jones, of Campbell, Australian Capital Territory. For public service.
- Ronald Clifford Jones, of Randwick, New South Wales. For service to veterans, sport and the community.
- Miss Roma Lorraine Kelton, of Campbelltown, New South Wales. For service to physically disabled children.
- Reverend Brother Gordon Declan Kerr, of Waverley, New South Wales. For service to education.
- Haig Bin Lacsana, of Home Island, Territory of Cocos (Keeling) Islands. For service to the community.
- Raymond Victor Lawrence, of Epping, New South Wales. For service to the Boy Scouts Association.
- Ronald McKauge, of Trinity Beach, Queensland. For service to veterans.
- Father Paul McLachlan, of Wooloowin, Queensland. For service to youth and the community.
- Ronald Joseph Lean Mason, of Lawes, Queensland. For service to the community.
- John Whitburn Nicholls, of Kingston Beach, Tasmania. For service to music and the performing arts.
- Sam Passi, of Via Thursday Island, Queensland. For service to the community.
- Alan Pearson, of Fairlight, New South Wales. For service to the maritime industry.
- Miss Ruth Adelaide Percival, of Barton, Australian Capital Territory. For public service.
- Gregory Gilbert Francis Quintal, of Norfolk Island, For service to the community.
- Eric William Robinson, of Singleton, New South Wales. For service to journalism and the community.
- Charles William Rowe, of Wendouree, Victoria. For service to veterans and the. community.
- Harold Vincent Salier, of Scottsdale, Tasmania. For service to the rural industry and to the community.
- Barbara, Mrs. Sattler, of Bagdad, Tasmania. For service to disabled people.
- Arthur Charles Sayer, of Ashgrove, Queensland. For public service.
- Alan John Seale, of Beecroft, New South Wales. For service to horticulture.
- Cyril George Staples, of Cronulla, New Wales. For service to the community.
- Herbert Alfred Frew Taylor, of Brighton, South Australia. For service to the community.
- Peter Alfred Toogood, of Seven Mile Beach, Tasmania. For service to sport.
- Doreen Elsie, Mrs. Trainor, of Palmyra, Western Australia. For service to Aboriginal welfare.
- Kennedy Gordon Phillip Tregonning, of Wembley Downs, Western Australia. For service to education.
- Frederick George Drake Tricks, of Black Rock, Victoria. For service to the sport of lawn bowls.
- Miss Margaret Collett Vaile, of Avalon Beach, New South Wales. For service to women and the community.
- Donald Douglas Wagstaff, of Montrose, Victoria. For service to the sport of diving.
- Gladys Edith, Mrs. Watson, of Seaforth South, Victoria. For service to youth and the community.
- Joan Ellen, Mrs. Watson, of Yarralumla, Australian Capital Territory. For service to politics.
- Thomas Walker Watson, of London, England. For public service.
- Reginald Yelverton Wilson, of Eden Hills, South Australia. For service to the community.

Military Division

ROYAL AUSTRALIAN NAVY

- Acting Commander Ivan John Bear (E55), Royal Australian Navy Emergency Reserve.
- Lieutenant Commander Robert Edward Norman Geale (E103093), Royal Australian Navy Emergency Reserve.
- Lieutenant Commander Raymond Arthur Speight (O2204), Royal Australian Navy.

AUSTRALIAN ARMY

- Major William Mayne Benson (25921), Royal Australian Electrical and Mechanical Engineers.
- Warrant Officer Class I Allan Joseph Johnson (213464), Royal Australian Corps of Signals.
- Major John Lambie (52884), Royal Australian Army Medical Corps.
- Captain Donald McGregor (28648), Royal Australian Infantry.
- Warrant Officer Class I Donald Jack Marshman (4191), Royal Australian Infantry (Active Citizen Military Forces).
- Chaplain Third Class John Francis Tinkler (216684), Royal Australian Army Chaplain.

ROYAL AUSTRALIAN AIR FORCE

- Squadron Leader Kenneth John Cairns (0111427), Royal Australian Air Force.
- Squadron Leader Ronald Alexander Young Mitchell (0316984), Royal Australian Air Force.
- Squadron Leader James Francis Roddy (05216), Royal Australian Air Force.
- Flight Sergeant John Reginald Hodges (A316327), Royal Australian Air Force.
- Flight Sergeant Rex William Reddacliff (A313245), Royal Australian Air Force.

=== Imperial Service Order (ISO) ===
- James Louis Burke, of Wollstonecraft, New South Wales. For public service.
- William David Hamilton, of Mount Waverley, Victoria. For public service.
- Bernard Clement Heagney, of Northbridge, New South Wales. For public service.
- Robert Hyslop, of Yarralumla, Australian Capital Territory. For public service.

=== British Empire Medal (BEM) ===
- Alice, Mrs. Barker, of Geraldtown, Western Australia. For.service to the community.
- Winifred Mary, Mrs. Bedford, of Goolwa, South Australia. For service to the community.
- Terence Henry Body, of Wentworth Falls, New South Wales. For service to disabled people and young people.
- George Richard Burwell, of Nelson Bay, New South Wales. For service to the community.
- Edyth Cavell, Mrs. Butler, of Deakin, Australian Capital Territory. For service to the community.
- Joan Mary, Mrs. Carpenter, of Quirindi, New South Wales. For service to the community.
- Neville Harry Coombe, of Broadview, South Australia. For. public service and service to youth.
- Miss Joan Mary, Cousins, of Hobart, Tasmania. For public service.
- Darrell Bruce Cruickshank, of Pearce, Australian Capital Territory. For public service.
- Annie Estelle, Mrs. Ellis, of Kempton, Tasmania. For service to the community.
- John Sherwood Gawne, of Frankston, Victoria. For service to the community.
- Miss Patricia Clancy, of Hampton, Victoria. For public service.
- David Matters Gordon, of Mount Crawford, South Australia. For service to the community and the grazing industry.
- Mervyn Alfred Haylings, of Seaforth, New South Wales. For public service.
- Miss Louise Homfrey, of Elsternwick, Victoria. For service to the blind.
- Miss Aurea Lainie Jarvis, of The Gap, Queensland. For public service.
- Kathleen Northcott, Mrs. Law, of Brighton-le-Sands, New South Wales. For service to women's sport.
- Robert Dudley Leonard, of Mosman, New South Wales. For service to veterans.
- Donald Ferguson McBain, of Point Vernon, Queensland. For service to the aged.
- Robert Daniel McKeague, of Kawana Waters, Queensland. For service to veterans and the disadvantaged.
- Frances Edna, Mrs. Millard, of Eden, New South Wales. For service to the community.
- Alma Morrison, Mrs. Milsom, of Uki, New South Wales. For service to the community.
- Gustav Karl Muhlhoff, of Riverstone, New South Wales. For service to migrants and the community.
- Mary, Mrs. O'Donnell, of Scarborough, Queensland. For service to the community.
- Miss Kathleen Marjorie Page, of Hove, England. For public service.
- Philip Alfred Penny, of Cairns, Queensland. For service to the aged.
- Angelo Rinaldo Picinali, of Noble Park, Victoria. For service to migrants and the community.
- Gordon Alfred Presland, of Cronulla, New South Wales. For service to the community.
- John Daniel Rahilly, of Nundah, Queensland. For service to veterans and the community.
- Mary Jane, Mrs. Rutherford, of Minyip, Victoria. For service to the community.
- Walter William Sheppard, of Bulleen, Victoria. For service to sport and to veterans.
- Miss Dorothy Jean Still, of Eastwood, New South Wales. For public service.
- Henry Verdun Traeger, of Dubbo, New South Wales. For service to veterans and the community.
- Rosemary Florence, Mrs. Whitaker, of Port Macquarie, New South Wales. For service to the community.
- Sister Mary Xavier (Miss Cahill), of Sans Souci, New South Wales. For service to the community and education.

=== Queen's Police Medal (QPM) ===
- Kenneth Max Horsell, Chief Inspector, Australian Federal Police.
- Walter Nickolas Wiliams, Chief Superintendent, Australian Federal Police.

=== Royal Red Cross ===
==== Associate of the Royal Red Cross (ARRC) ====
AUSTRALiAN ARMY

- Major Janice Christina Ann McCarthy (F3S071), Royal Australian Army Nursing Corps.
- Major Shirley Joan Southwell (F22985), Royal Australian Army Nursing Corps.

=== Air Force Cross (AFC) ===
ROYAL AUSTRALIAN AIR FORCE

- Flight Lieutenant Harry Campbell Bradford (045901), Royal Australian Air Force.
- Flight Lieutenant Gerard Peter Keogh (0117907), Royal Australian Air Force.
- Squadron Leader Ronald James Magrath (0221795), Royal Australian Air Force.

=== Queen's Commendation for Valuable Service in the Air ===
ROYAL AUSTRALIAN AIR FORCE

- Flight Lieutenant Peter Ronald Bradford (0113523), Royal Australian Air Force.
- Squadron Leader Cecil Michael Lucas (0222454), Royal Australian Air Force.
- Flight Lieutenant John Richard O'Keeffe (0113337), Royal Australian Air Force.
- Squadron Leader Alan William Titheridge (0316663), Royal Australian Air Force.

== Barbados ==
=== Knight Bachelor ===
- Senator Mencea Ethereal Cox, Chairman of the Constitution Review Commission.

=== Order of the British Empire ===
==== Commander of the Order of the British Empire (CBE) ====
- John Antony Jerningham Murray, For services to Barbados as an adviser at International conferences relating to the sugar industry.
- Reynold St. Clair Weekes, M.P. For services to the community in local and central government and to the local Branch of the Parliamentary Association.

== Mauritius ==
=== Knight Bachelor ===
- Jean Etienne Moi-Lin Ah-Chuen. For political and public services.
- Ramesh Jeewoolall, Speaker, Legislative Assembly.

=== Order of the British Empire ===
==== Commander of the Order of the British Empire (CBE) ====
- Joseph Marie Jacques Koenig. For services to the sugar industry.
- Louis Marcel Pierre Simonet, O.B.E. For political and public services and voluntary social work.

==== Officer of the Order of the British Empire (OBE) ====
- Marie Charles Louis Couocaud. For services to the development of the local fishing industry.
- Miss Evangeline Miriam Danjoux, formerly Principal, Mauritius College of Education.
- Joseph Alfred Noel D'Argent, Managing Director, State Insurance Corporation of Mauritius.
- Anmole Facknat. For services to the co-operative movement and for voluntary social work.
- Hurruck Hoolsy. For services to the co-operative movement and voluntary social work.
- Lutchmee Parsad Ramyead, formerly Adviser to Students, Mauritius High Commission, London.

==== Member of the Order of the British Empire (MBE) ====
- Maud Ada Saraswatee, Mrs. Babajee, formerly Inspector of Schools Ministry of Education and Cultural Affairs.
- Veloo Chellombron. For services to the co-operative movement and to rural local government.
- Maiganatha Saminada Chetty. For services to rural local government and voluntary social work.
- Denis Mamotte. For voluntary social service.
- Sahadeo Maudho, formerly Inspector of Schools, Ministry of Education and Cultural Affairs.
- Bai Hassam Mohamoodally Peerun, formerly Deputy Controller, Employment Service.
- Jayram Seetohul. For voluntary social work.

=== Mauritius Police Medal ===
- Louis Ecosse Marcel, Superintendent, Mauritius Police Force.
- Harris Mungroosing, Chief Inspector, Mauritius Police Force.
- Pierre Desire Guy Nayna, Assistant Commissioner, Mauritius Police Force.
- Ambikaparsadsing Ramdin, Inspector, Mauritius Police Force.

== Fiji ==
=== Order of the British Empire ===
==== Knight Commander of the Order of the British Empire (KBE) ====
- Robert Tait Sanders, C.M.G., lately Secretary to the Cabinet.
- Justice Moti Tikaram, Ombudsman.

==== Commander of the Order of the British Empire (CBE) ====
- Surendra Singh, Commissioner of Inland Revenue.

==== Officer of the Order of the British Empire (OBE) ====
Military Division

- Lieutenant Colonel Ratu Epeli Naila Tikau, M.V .O., Commanding Officer, 1st Battalion Fiji Infantry Regiment.

Civil Division

- Benijamini Ravulolo Lomaloma. For services as Principal Medical Officer and to the community.
- Sister Genevieve Loo. For services to teaching and the community.
- Gyan Singh, Permanent Secretary for Urban Development and Housing.

==== Member of the Order of the British Empire (MBE) ====
Military Division

- Warrant Officer Class I Apakuki Suluaqalo Najoritani, Royal Fiji Military Forces.

Civil Division

- Ratu Joseva Iloilo. For public service and service to the community.
- Alfred Henry Marlow. For services to building and to the community.
- Khushalbhai Nathubhai Patel, J.P. For service to the community.
- Lui Kum Zoing, J.P. For services to the community.

=== British Empire Medal (BEM) ===
- Ratu Manasa Tikoca, M.M., Senior Supervisor (Buildings), Public Works Department.

== Bahamas ==
=== Knight Bachelor ===
- Henry Milton Taylor, Editor of Hansard. For public service.

=== Order of the British Empire ===
==== Commander of the Order of the British Empire (CBE) ====
- Garnet James Levarity, O.B.E., M.P. For public service.
- Margaret Evangeline, Mrs. McDonald, Permanent Secretary, Ministry of Works and Utilities.

==== Officer of the Order of the British Empire (OBE) ====
- Olivia Elizabeth, Mrs. Watkins. For service to Nursing and Prison services.

==== Member of the Order of the British Empire (MBE) ====
- Norma Angela, Mrs. Allen, Blood Procurement Officer, Princess Margaret Hospital.
- Barbara Antoinette, Mrs. Pierre, Director of Immigration.

=== British Empire Medal (BEM) ===
- The Reverend John Errol Cleare, Transport Officer, Princess Margaret Hospital.
- Leroy Lennis Fowler, Security Officer, Princess Margaret Hospital.
- The Reverend Stafford Pinder. For service to the community of Eleuthera.

== Papua New Guinea ==
=== Order of St Michael and St George ===
==== Companion of the Order of St Michael and St George (CMG) ====
- Albert Lloyd Hurrell, O.B.E., M.C., lately Chairman, Coffee Industry Board.

=== Order of the British Empire ===
==== Knight Commander of the Order of the British Empire (KBE) ====
- The Honourable Julius Chan, C.B.E., M.P. For distinguished services to politics and government.

==== Commander of the Order of the British Empire (CBE) ====
- Alkan Tololo, O.B.E. For public service in the field of education.

==== Officer of the Order of the British Empire (OBE) ====
- Angmai Bilas, M.P. For services to politics and the community.
- Frederick Peter Kaad. For public service and services to the training of Papua New Guineans.
- Tiotem Kepas. For services to education.
- Sydney Preston Saville, lately Deputy Secretary, Department of Primary Industry.

==== Member of the Order of the British Empire (MBE) ====
- Tolik Eremus, Sub-Inspector, Royal Papua New Guinea Constabulary.
- Kirupano Eza'e. For public service as a land mediator.
- Rita, Mrs Flynn. For services to sport.
- Kini Kila, Sub-Inspector, Bandmaster, Royal Papua New Guinea Constabulary Band.
- Enny, Mrs. Moaitz, Chief Commissioner, Girl Guides of Papua New Guinea.
- Robert Angus Smales. For services to journalism.
- Captain Heliodor Otmar Tschuchnigg. For services to civil aviation.
- Maurice William Wells. For services to industrial relations.

=== British Empire Medal (BEM) ===
Military Division

- Sergeant Made Arom(81103), Papua New Guinea Defence Force.
- Corporal Poida Dauda (837), Papua New Guinea Defence Force.
- Corporal (Provisional Sergeant) Patrick Olimomo (81657), Papua New Guinea Defence Force.
- Sergeant (Provisional Warrant Officer) Rarupe Samuel (82672), Papua New Guinea Defence Force.

Civil Division

- Gwa Livinai, Sergeant Major, Royal Papua New Guinea Constabulary.
- Henari Reuben, Government Interpreter.
- Clement Mungingaui Sangimeri. For public service in the field of health.
- Bais Yambinangre, Government Driver.

== Solomon Islands ==
=== Order of the British Empire ===
==== Commander of the Order of the British Empire (CBE) ====
- Lloyd Maepeza Gina, Speaker of National Parliament.

==== Officer of the Order of the British Empire (OBE) ====
- Japhet Ramo Fa'Arodo, Assistant Medical Officer, Ministry of Health and Medical Services.

==== Member of the Order of the British Empire (MBE) ====
- The Reverend Patteson Gatu. For services to the church and community.
- Peter Larmour, Senior Administrative Officer, Ministry of Agriculture and Lands.
- Francis Waleilia, Chief Administrative Officer, Ministry of Natural Resources.

=== British Empire Medal (BEM) ===
- Petaia Delaiverata, Works Officer, Ministry of Works and Public Utilities.
- John Kwaeota, General Operations Overseer, Solomon Islands Ports Authority.
- James Loti, District Surveyor, Lands Division, Ministry of Agriculture and Lands.
- The Reverend Robert Teal Pule. For services to the church and the community.

=== Queen's Police Medal ===
- John Patrick Holloway, O.B.E., C.P.M., Commissioner of Police, Solomon Islands Police Force.

== Tuvalu ==
=== Order of the British Empire ===
==== Member of the Order of the British Empire (MBE) ====
- The Reverend Panapa Makini. For services to the Tuvalu church and people.
- Kokea Malua. For services to sport and the arts.

=== British Empire Medal (BEM) ===
- Tuisani Fou. For services to shipping.

== St. Lucia ==
=== Order of the British Empire ===
==== Officer of the Order of the British Empire (OBE) ====
- Charles Anthony Augustin, J.P. For services to the trade union movement, to sport and the community.
- Charles Marie Emmanuel Cadet, M.B.E., Trade Attache, Saint Lucia High Commission, London.

==== Member of the Order of the British Empire (MBE) ====
- Pamphiie Joseph Alexander. For services to the community.
