= Tikaram =

Tikaram is a surname. Notable people with the surname include:

- Moti Tikaram, Indo-Fijian judge, civil servant, and football administrator
- Ramon Tikaram (born 1967), British actor
- Tanita Tikaram (born 1969), British singer-songwriter
