= Naomi Wing =

Australian physician

Naomi Wing CBE
- Born: Marie Naomi Hardy; 2 October 1903; Narrabri, New South Wales, Australia
- Died: 27 February 1985 (aged 81); Hornsby, New South Wales, Australia
- Education: University of Sydney
- Occupations: Physician, rheumatologist
- Known for: Rehabilitative medicine

Naomi Wing CBE (2 October 1903 – 27 February 1985) was an Australian physician who specialised in rheumatology and rehabilitative medicine.

== Early life and education ==
Marie Naomi Hardy was born in Narrabri, New South Wales on 2 October 1903. She sat for the Intermediate at Narrabri District School in 1919 and completed her secondary education at North Sydney Girls High School the following year. She graduated with an MB BS from the University of Sydney in 1927 and was registered as a medical practitioner in New South Wales on 26 September 1927.

== Career ==
Following her graduation, Wing worked first at Sydney Hospital and then Lithgow Hospital from mid-1928.

Following her marriage to fellow doctor, Lindon Wing, they went into practice together at Pambula in 1929. In 1936 the couple moved to Cooma where they set up in general practice.

The family spent a year overseas in the early 1950s. Wing studied rheumatology in Edinburgh and returned to work in Sydney in that specialty. In 1953 she was employed by the Royal South Sydney Hospital as an assistant rheumatologist. On a visit to the United States and United Kingdom to develop her rheumatology skills, she also observed rehabilitation facilities and their role in patients' recovery from injury.

In 1956 a pilot rehabilitation service was set up at Royal South Sydney Hospital under Wing's management. Two years later the service was fully authorised. Wing served as its director until her retirement in 1973. She continued a private rheumatology practice in Macquarie Street, before retiring in 1984.

== Honours and recognition ==
Wing was appointed an Officer of the Order of the British Empire in the 1968 Queen's Birthday Honours. She was promoted to Commander in the 1980 New Year's Honours.

The Naomi Wing Rehabilitation Centre (1976–1993) was named in her honour.

== Personal ==
Wing married Dr Lindon Woorlledge Wing on 25 December 1928 at Blackheath, New South Wales. Their first daughter was born in 1929. Her husband died in 1977 and younger daughter in 1941.

Wing died in Hornsby, New South Wales on 27 February 1985. She was survived by a son and daughter.
