= John Ellis (physician) =

British physician

Sir John Rogers Ellis, MBE (15 June 1916 – 16 June 1998) was a British physician.

Ellis was educated at Oundle and Trinity Hall, Cambridge where he was contemporary with Michael Straight. He was briefly in general practice in Plymouth after war then became a supernumerary registrar on the medical unit of the London Hospital under Clifford Wilson. Took the MRCP in 1947. Ran introductory and membership courses. He was appointed sub-dean in 1948. Appointed consultant physician in 1951.

He was the Assistant registrar at the Royal College of Physicians from 1957 to 1961. On the Council from 1969 to 1972. The education committee of the Royal College of Physicians sent him round every medical school in the UK and Scandinavia. A Rockefeller Fellowship enabled him to do the same in the US.

In 1964, he was part-time principal medical officer at the Ministry of Health with the special remit of postgraduate medical education. He served on the Todd Royal Commission on Medical Education.

In 1968, he recommended the merger of the thirty little university medical institutions in London into six large enough to be viable. That same year, Dean of London Hospital Medical College worked for the merger between the London, Bart's and Queen Mary College.

== Family ==
He married Joan Davenport, a physiotherapist, in 1942. They had two sons, one is a consultant physician in Birmingham and one former police officer, and two daughters.

== Honours ==
- Knighted in 1980
- In commemoration of his work at the Royal London Medical School, he has since had a lecture theatre named after him.
- Honorary member of the Royal Flemish Academy of Medicine and of the Swedish Medical Society
