= Kathleen Alder =

German businessperson

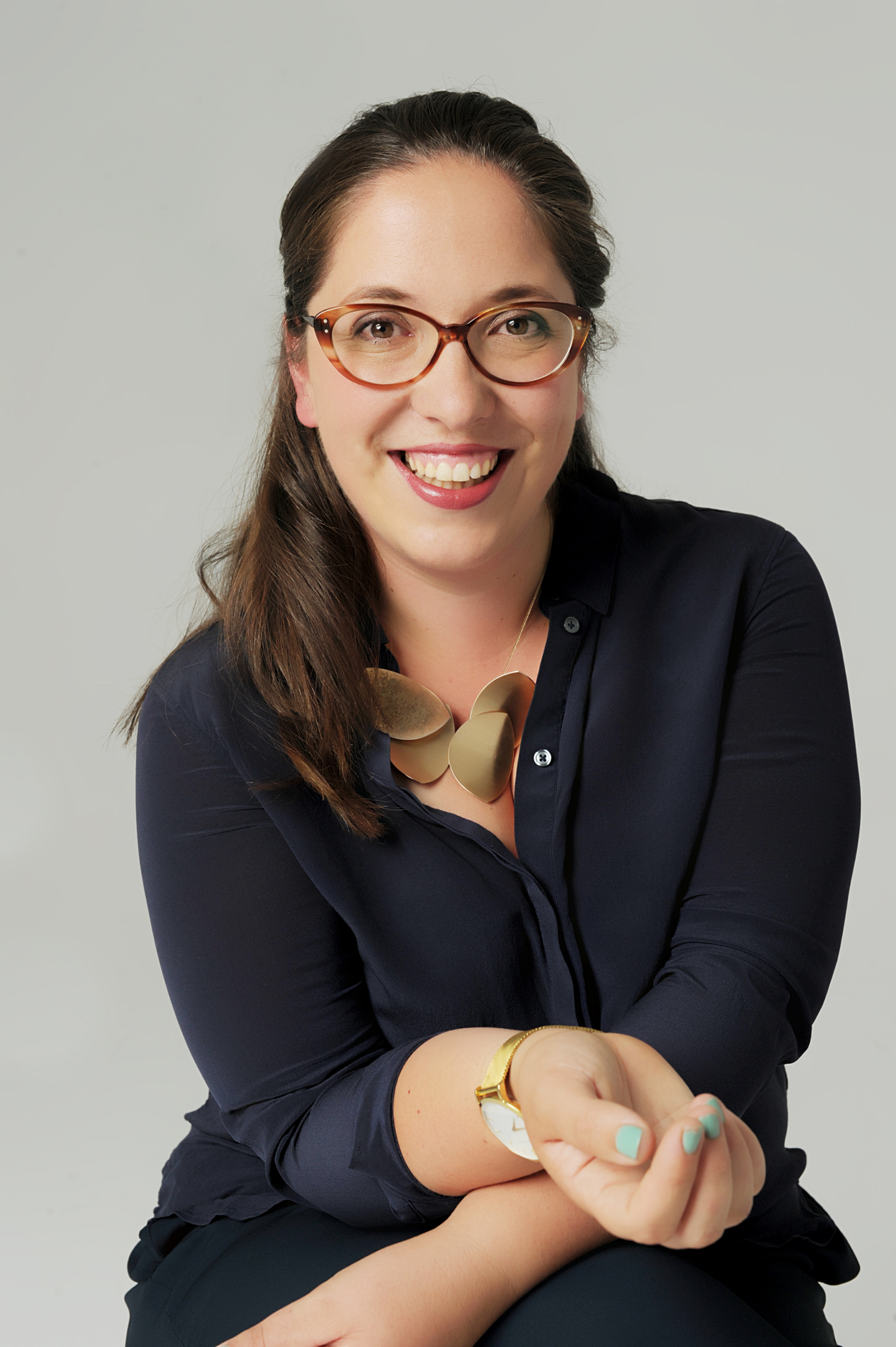
- Born: 29 August 1983 (age 42); Hamburg

Kathleen Alder (born 29 August 1983, in Hamburg) is founder and director of the PR agency WildKat PR. She is also a speaker at conferences as an expert in public relations, promotion, concert organisation and social media in the classical music field.

== Early life and career ==
Kathleen Alder was born in Hamburg and raised in a very musical household. Her father, Chris Alder, is a music producer, with prizes including a Grammy Award for Best Classical Vocal Solo. Before founding WildKat PR, Kathleen Alder worked with El Sistema in Venezuela, at the Mahler Chamber Orchestra in Berlin, TVT Europe and Universal Music Group in London. In 2008 she launched her own PR Agency under the name WildKat PR. Three years later, in November 2011, she was awarded PR Week’s prestigious “29 under 29”. Besides running WildKat PR she speaks regularly at conferences and debates – most recently the Influencer Conference in London and Berlin, at the MIDEM in France and at Classical:Next in Germany.

== WildKat PR ==
WildKat PR was founded by Kathleen Alder in April 2008.

In 2009, WildKat PR opened their Berlin branch. In 2016 WildKat employ 10 permanent staff and a network of freelancers. Kathleen Alder is constantly keen to experiment with new work-life balance trends, for example she established a 6-hourday scheme for her employees, reported The Guardian.

In May 2019, WildKat announced a major investment of 850,000 Pound Sterling from Edition Capital, an investment and advisory group. This news was reported within the specialist press in the UK (Music Week, Rhinegold Publishing) and Germany (PR Journal, Neue Musik Zeitung, Musikwoche). This investment allowed WildKat to build on their locations in London and Berlin with new offices in Paris, New York and LA within the same year. This expansion was also reported in furthers press articles (International Arts Managers, PR Week).

== Network Dutyfy ==
In 2013, Kathleen Alder founded the Dutyfy Network, a network for women whose personal life and work life matter to them in equal measure. The Website "The Wallbreakers" reported on the launch.

== Fellowship Noted Innovation ==
In 2015, Kathleen Alder created the fellowship Noted Innovation, which aims to offer financial support, industry opportunities and mentorship to up-and-coming talent in arts administration. The idea is to customize the fellowship around the recipient, in order to maximize their full potential and their impact on the industry. The first award winners in 2015 were the project Young Music Lab and the trombone player Johannes Weidner. Both the English and German press covered the launch.

== The Voices Foundation ==
In fall 2018 Kathleen Alder became a trustee for the Voices Foundation. She has since been active with the foundation in organizing its 25th anniversary concert and The Big Give campaign, a rally to gain funds for the charity's work.

== PostKultur ==
In 2020, Kathleen Alder founded PostKultur in Hamburg, a delivery service of cultural offers including items such as CDs, books, concert tickets and artwork. The idea was inspired by the subsequent shutdown of most cultural institutions as a result of the Coronavrírus-pandemic in 2020. The start-up service aims to make cultural items more accessible to a wider audience. Plans are underway for an expansion to other cities such as Frankfurt, Berlin, München, Stuttgart, Dresden.

== Awards ==
- 2011 – PR Week's prestigious "29 under 29"
- 2017 – PANDA Women Leadership Contest 2017
- 2018 – Finalist in the Arts & Culture Category for Women of the Future Awards 2018
