= Geoffrey Templeman =

Vice-Chancellor of the University of Kent at Canterbury

Geoffrey Templeman CBE DL FSA (15 February 1914 – 22 February 1988) was Vice-Chancellor of the University of Kent at Canterbury, 1963–1980. He was appointed a CBE in 1980. The Templeman Library at the Canterbury campus of the University of Kent is named after him.
