= John Grugeon =

British politician

Sir John Drury Grugeon DL (20 September 1928 – 22 November 2009) was a British Conservative politician and a leading figure in English local government.

Grugeon was educated at Epsom Grammar School and the Royal Military Academy, Sandhurst. He joined the Buffs in 1948 and the 1st Battalion in Hong Kong, serving in the Far East, Africa, Europe and the UK. He was the adjutant of the Regimental Depot and the 5th Battalion. Grugeon was elected to Kent County Council in 1967 and was elected leader of the county council in 1973, serving until 1982. He was leader of the Association of County Councils from 1984 to 1987, as well as chairman of Tunbridge Wells Health Authority 1984–92 and chairman of Kent Police Authority 1992–98.

Grugeon was knighted for services to local government in 1980 and appointed a deputy lieutenant of Kent in 1986.
