= Peter Beer (RAF officer) =

British RAF officer

- Born: 16 July 1941 (age 85)
- Military career
- Allegiance: United Kingdom
- Branch: Royal Air Force
- Rank: Air vice-marshal
- Commands: RAF Brize Norton
- Awards: Companion of the Order of the Bath; Commander of the Order of the British Empire; Lieutenant of the Royal Victorian Order

Air vice-marshal Peter George Beer, CB, CBE, LVO (born 16 July 1941) is a retired senior Royal Air Force officer who was Equerry to The Queen from 1971 to 1974.

== RAF career ==
Beer was born in 1941. He attended the Royal College of Defence Studies, and the Royal Air Force College Cranwell. He was appointed a Lieutenant of the Royal Victorian Order in 1974.

Beer was station commander of RAF Brize Norton in 1986, and was promoted to air commodore on 1 July 1987. By 1990 he was Director Air Plans and Programmes. On promotion to air vice marshal he was appointed Commander British Forces Falkland Islands from 1991 to 1992, Director-General Training and Personnel from 1992, and Chief of Staff, Personnel and Training Command from July 1994.

== Retirement ==
After his retirement from the RAF, Beer became home bursar at Jesus College, Oxford, from 1997 to 2006, succeeding Air Commodore John De'Ath. Peter Beer is an emeritus fellow of Jesus College, Oxford.
