= Angus McDermid =

Welsh journalist

- Born: Angus McDermid; 14 December 1920; Bangor, Wales
- Died: 13 October 1988 (aged 67)
- Occupation: BBC News foreign correspondent

Angus McDermid OBE (14 December 1920 - 13 October 1988) was a Welsh journalist and broadcaster. Having joined the BBC in 1957, he became one of the corporation's most prolific radio foreign correspondents, working across Africa, Washington and Europe.

== Career ==
McDermid began his career as a cub reporter on the North Wales Chronicle in 1939, based in his home town of Bangor.

In 1963, he became the BBC's central African correspondent and the continent soon became his primary beat for the decade. In 1964, he was appointed the BBC's west African correspondent. By the end of the 1960s, McDermid was working as the public broadcaster's South Africa correspondent, based in Johannesburg. During his time in Africa, he reported on the death of Congolese prime minister Patrice Lumumba.

McDermid was a regular contributor to BBC radio programme From Our Own Correspondent. One of his pieces, according to fellow BBC journalist John Simpson, focussed on a censor in Zanzibar who kept a revolver and a hand grenade under his desk. In 1985, McDermid presented a special 30th anniversary edition of the show.

In a career that included a stint as the BBC's Washington correspondent in the 1970s, McDermid still enjoyed finding other towns named Bangor across the world.

His daughter Kate Dickens is a former journalist who worked on various newspapers and magazines. His grandson Andrew Dickens is Executive Vice President of Communications and Marketing at Banijay Rights, one of the world's largest content distributors. He was previously a Senior Government Press Officer and the Chief Reporter at international television publication C21 Media.

== Awards ==
Queen Elizabeth II honoured him in 1980 by making him an officer of the Order of the British Empire.

In 2009, Bangor City Council placed a plaque on his childhood home to commemorate his life.
