= Moti Tikaram =

Indo-Fijian judge, civil servant, and football administrator

Sir Moti Tikaram, KBE, CF
- Born: 18 March 1925; Lami, Colony of Fiji, British Empire
- Died: 17 May 2012 (aged 87); Suva, Fiji
- Education: L.L.B.
- Occupation(s): Judge, ombudsman
- Children: 3

Sir Moti Tikaram, KBE, CF (18 March 1925 – 17 May 2012) was an Indo-Fijian judge, civil servant, and football administrator. He was the first Fijian appointed to be a magistrate, and the first appointed as a judge of the High Court of Fiji. From 1972 to 1987 he was Fiji's first ombudsman. He later served as President of the Fiji Court of Appeal.

== Early life ==
Tikaram was born in Lami near Suva, and was educated at Samabula Government Indian School, Suva Methodist Primary School, and Marist Brothers High School. He studied journalism at the University of Auckland in New Zealand, but switched to law after two years, completing his studies at Victoria University of Wellington and graduating in 1954. He was admitted to the bar in New Zealand in 1954, and in Fiji in 1955. He worked as a lawyer for several years, and successfully defended Tongan MP Samisoni Puliuvea Afuha'amango against a charge of sedition.

== Legal and judicial career ==
He was appointed a stipendary magistrate in 1959. Following a riot at the Suva gaol in 1963, he was appointed to lead the resulting inquiry, and his recommendations formed the basis of a new prisons law. In April 1969 he became the first Fijian-born person to be appointed a judge. Following the retirement of Clifford Hammett, he served as acting Chief Justice of Fiji until replaced by John Nimmo.

In 1972, he was appointed Fiji's first Ombudsman. He served in the role until the 1987 Fijian coups d'état, when he retired; at the time of his retirement, he was the longest serving national ombudsman in the world. He was a member of the International Commission of Jurists from 1984 to 1989.

After Fiji became a republic in 1987, he was re-appointed a judge and served for many years as the President of the Fiji Court of Appeal.

Following his death in 2012 the University of Fiji established an annual Sir Moti Tikaram Memorial Lecture in his honour.

== Football administrator ==
Tikaram was the President of the Fiji Football Association from 1959 to 1960, and was credited with making the Association multi-racial and initiating moves to have its name changed from Fiji Indian Football Association.

== Awards ==
- He was made a Knight Commander of the Order of the British Empire in the 1980 New Year Honours.
- In 2007, he was awarded the Pravasi Bharatiya Samman by the Ministry of Overseas Indian Affairs.
- In 2009, was awarded the "Sardar Vallabhbhai Patel Award" in New Delhi, India at the Indian Diaspora Celebrations.

== Family ==
He was the great-uncle of actor Ramon Tikaram and singer-songwriter Tanita Tikaram.
