= Manuel Aroney =

Australian human rights advocate (1932–2011)

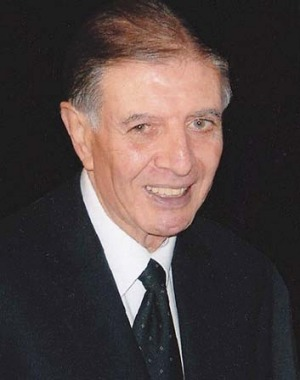
- Born: Manuel Aroney; 31 August 1932; Sydney, Australia
- Died: 15 February 2011 (aged 88)
- Education: University of Sydney
- Occupations: Academic and chemist

Manuel James Aroney AM, OBE (31 August 1932 – 15 February 2011) was an Australian chemist, academic and human rights advocate.

== Recognition ==
Aroney's contribution to society were recognised by the award in 1979 of an OBE (Officer of the Order of the British Empire) for services to the university and to the community and in 1989 of an AM (Member of the Order of Australia) for services to multiculturalism and the Greek community.
