= Yellow Drawing Room =

Room in Buckingham Palace

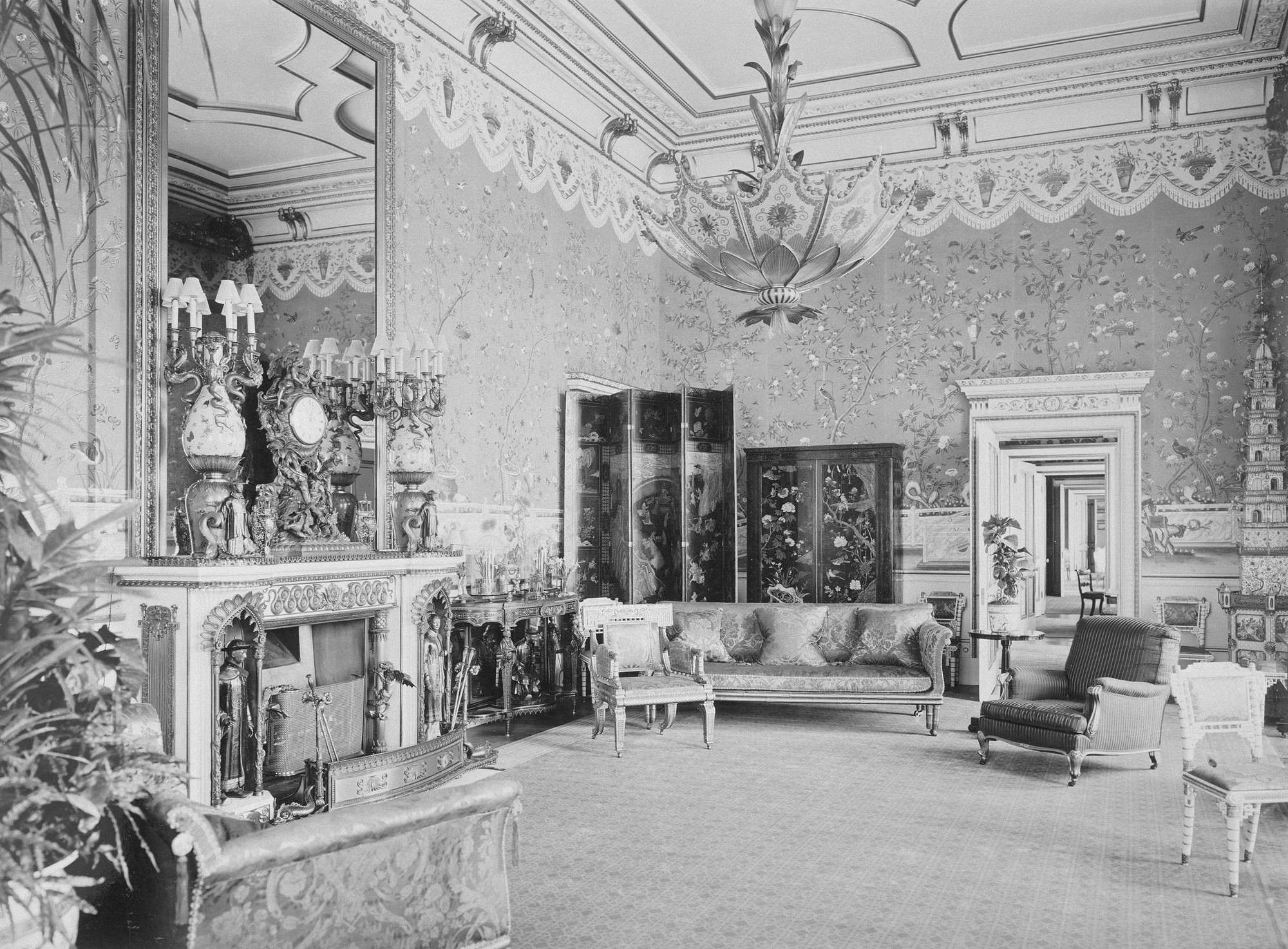
A c. 1914 photograph of the room

The Yellow Drawing Room is a room in Buckingham Palace. It is noted for its chinoiserie decorative scheme and has been the setting for many portraits of members of the British royal family.

== Location ==
The room is at the west end of the Great Gallery on the first floor of the palace and overlooks the forecourt. The room was created as part of Edward Blore's development of the palace in the 1840s. The Chinese Luncheon Room is at the opposite end, with the Centre Room in between. The room interconnects with a suite of bedrooms and dressing rooms for visitors. The name of the room derives from the amber-coloured satin damask that hung in the room in the 19th century. The room is 32 ft (9.8 m) in height, and is roughly square.

A number of pieces from the Yellow Drawing Room were among 120 objects from Buckingham Palace that were loaned to the Royal Pavilion for two years from September 2019. The pieces were displayed at the pavilion where they had originally been placed after their acquisition by George IV. The pieces were removed from the Yellow Drawing Room during work on the East Wing of Buckingham Palace.

== Decoration ==
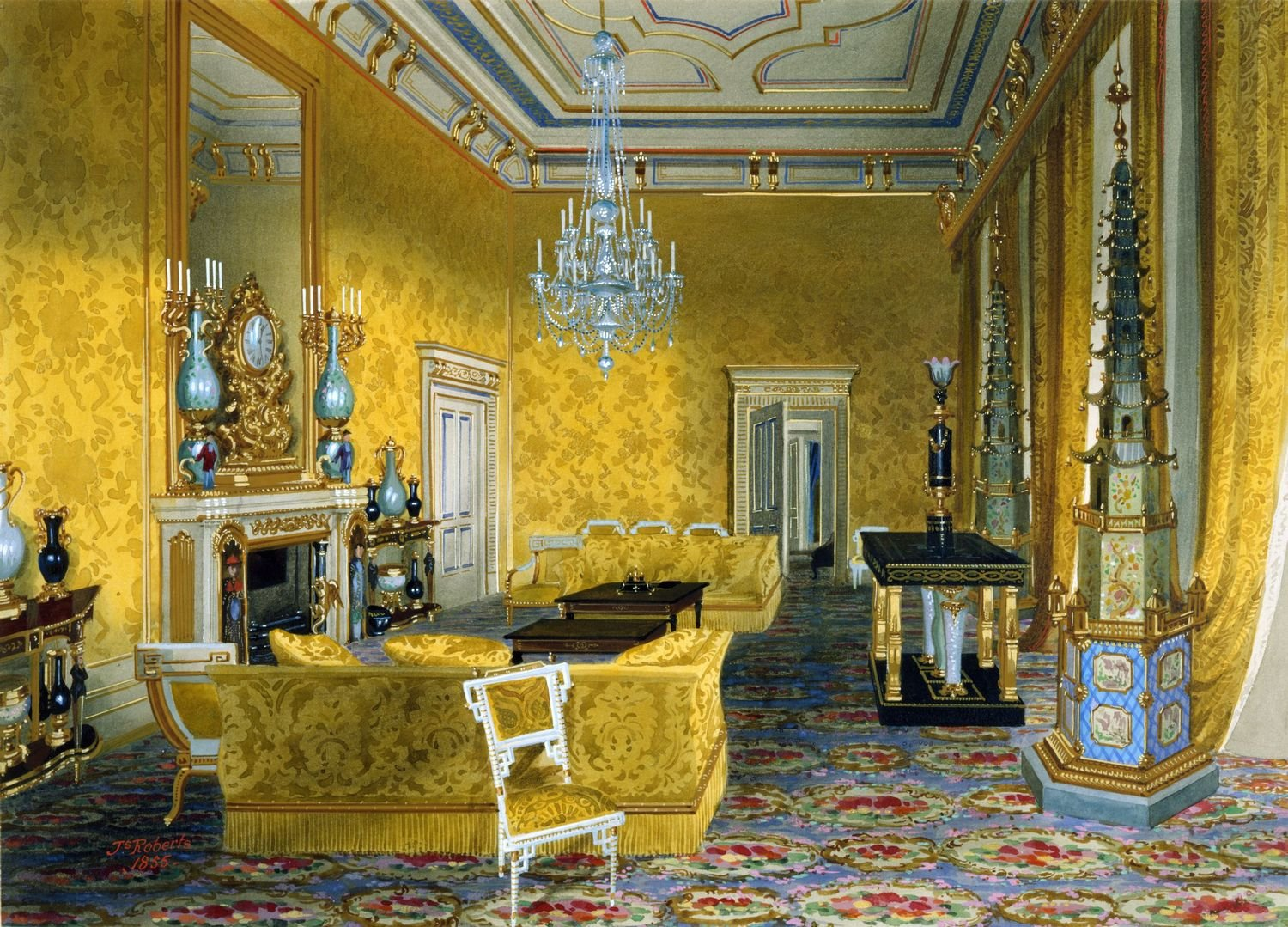
An 1855 watercolour of the room

Charles Knight's 1843 guide to London described the room as the "most superb of the whole" of the rooms on the floor and noted that it was decorated with full length portraits of the royal family painted on panels. The Illustrated London News described the room as "the most superb of the entire range of rooms" of the western front of the palace in 1844, and likened its appearance to the drawing room of the Reform Club on Pall Mall. Sculptural reliefs by William Pitts were a feature of the room in the 1840s. A series of twelve reliefs on the "origin and progress of pleasure" decorated the room. The individual reliefs have been described in sequence as depicting; Love Awakening the Soul to Pleasure, the Soul in the Bower of Fancy, the Pleasure of Decoration, the Invention of Music, the Pleasure of Music, the Dance, the Masquerade, the Drama, the contest for the Palm, the Palm resigned, the Struggle for the Laurel and the Laurel obtained. The Illustrated London News regretted the addition of medallion portraits of royal family members that broke up the frieze.

The chandelier in the Yellow Drawing Room was formerly hung in the Music Room of the Royal Pavilion.

The room was redecorated in yellow silk for the visit of French Emperor Napoleon III and his spouse, the Empress Eugénie, in 1855 when it was used as the Emperor's reception room. The couple stayed at Buckingham Palace for three days. The Illustrated London News described the decoration of the room as "incongruous" owing to the addition of the chinoiserie furniture from the Royal Pavilion.

=== Chinoiserie ===
The room contains many objects from the chinoiserie decorative scheme by Frederick Crace for the Royal Pavilion in Brighton. The Centre Room and Chinese Drawing Room are also decorated in a similar style. The pieces were bought to Buckingham Place after the 1850 sale of the pavilion; and incorporated into rooms at the palace under the direction of Prince Albert.

External videos
- Wallpaper Conservation at Buckingham Palace

The wallpaper in the Yellow Drawing Room was supplied in 1817 for the saloon of the Royal Pavilion, the wallpaper was ordered by George IV, and rediscovered in the palace in the 20th century. It was hung under Queen Mary's redecoration of the room in the 1920s. The wallpaper was removed for conservation in 2020; its removal took a month. Following conservation the wallpaper should not require further care for 100 years. The wallpaper depicts a Chinese garden with birds with distinctive plumages and butterflies as well as fruit trees and shrubs. The decorative scheme of the wallpaper is divided between two borders; the upper has tall green jars and hanging baskets with magnolias and peonies, the lower border features wading birds and tall lotus plants.

The room has a chimney piece in the Chinese style from the Saloon at the Royal Pavilion. It was made by Samuel Parker to a design by Robert Jones in 1822 at a cost of £922 (equivalent to £101,284 in 2025). It has nodding mandarins wearing dresses of varnished metal in niches and fearsome winged ormolu dragons. The mounted Chinese celadon candelabra on the fireplace also came from the saloon. The frieze of the mantelpiece depicts two serpents approaching a sunflower with two winged dragons climbing the steel columns that support the mantelpiece.

The Rock Clock on the fireplace was originally situated in the Music Room of the pavilion. Its design has been attributed to Sébastien Slodtz. It depicts a dragon being attacked by Mars wrapped around a rock and palm tree. Juno is atop the dial, with Cupid shown embracing a peacock.

A pair of tables in the chinoiserie style stand either side of the chimney piece. One of the tables is French, and dates from c.1780; it was originally part of the Chinese Room at Carlton House. The other table is English, and is a copy of the French table; it was made for the Music Room Gallery at the Royal Pavilion in 1819 by Edward Bailey. A set of chairs made by Bailey & Sanders in the room were originally situated in the Banqueting Room Gallery at the pavilion.

The room is home to a pair of Chinese pagodas in porcelain on Spode bases. The pagodas sit either side of a pietra dura-topped table made by Morel & Seddon; it was originally intended for Windsor Castle's Crimson Drawing Room. A matching pair of pagodas stood in the Principal Corridor of the palace in the 1930s.

== Portraits setting ==
The room has been the setting for numerous portraits of members of the British royal family. Terence Cuneo recalled photographing the four-year-old Prince Charles in the Yellow Drawing Room in 1953 as part of his preparations for the official portrait of the coronation of Elizabeth II. Charles asked to photograph Cuneo in turn, and was hoisted by Cuneo onto a 9-foot (2.7 m) ladder, much to the consternation of Cuneo and his nurse, Nanny Lightbody. Bryan Organ used the room as the setting for his portrait of Diana, Princess of Wales in 1981. Justin Mortimer's 1997 abstract portrait The Queen was commissioned by the Royal Society of Arts. The light artist Chris Levine took 10,000 images in the Yellow Drawing Room of Queen Elizabeth II over two sittings to create his 2004 hologram, Equanimity. This was the first 3D holographic portrait of the Queen. Rolf Harris painted the Queen in the room for his portrait to mark her 80th birthday in 2005. Prince Philip, Duke of Edinburgh posed in the room for his 2012 portrait by painter Jemma Phipps. Darren Baker's 2011 portrait of the Queen in the Yellow Drawing Room was commissioned to mark the 90th anniversary of the Royal British Legion and depicted her wearing five remembrance poppies and showing the time of 11 am on her wristwatch to symbolise the armistice that ended World War I.
