= Bryan Organ =

English portrait painter (born 1935)

- Born: 31 August 1935 (age 91); Leicester, England
- Education: Loughborough College of Art; Royal Academy Schools
- Occupation: Artist
- Known for: Portrait painting
- Notable work: Malcolm Muggeridge II; Tippett at De Montfort Hall; HRH The Princess Margaret (1970); Prince Charles (1980); Diana, Princess of Wales (1981); Prince Philip, Duke of Edinburgh (1983)

Bryan Organ (born 31 August 1935 in Leicester) is a British artist considered one of the leading and most innovative English portrait painters of the 20th century. His paintings have included portraits of prominent public figures and of members of the British royal family. Organ is also known for landscape paintings, such as St Pancras Station (Leicester New Walk Museum and Art Gallery), and lithographic studies of animals (Tate). London's National Portrait Gallery holds a total of sixteen of his portraits of which six were commissioned by the Gallery's Trustees.

Organ studied at Loughborough College of Art and the Royal Academy Schools (1952–1959), before returning to teach at Loughborough College of Art (1959–1966). In 1967, Organ left the college and to continue painting as a full-time career. His first solo exhibition was at Leicester City Art Gallery (1958) when still a student. He has been represented by The Redfern Gallery since 1967.

Organ lives and works in Leicestershire and London. He is a godfather to Prince Harry, Duke of Sussex.

== Portraiture ==
Bryan Organ became interested in portraiture in the mid-1960s. For him portraiture was not a separate art: "A portrait is a picture, presenting just the same problems as a still life or a landscape or an abstract. And this is true irrespective of who the sitter is. The solutions may be different, of course, but essentially the end product must be judged as a work of art." In 1971, the National Portrait Gallery Director Roy Strong said: "In his role as face-maker Bryan Organ emerges as one of the two or three painters of his generation to make any significant statement, let alone display any enthusiasm for the despised art of the portrait."

Organ's first portrait, painted in 1966, was of the journalist and satirist Malcolm Muggeridge. It was, in Organ's words, '"not commissioned, but done because I wanted to in January 1966. I spent a considerable amount of time with him, observing the way he moves and gestures and speaks. After all, to anyone who has seen Muggeridge on the TV, the image he conjures up is not static, it's in movement all the time. So I made lots of studies and from these made a distillation, retaining recognizable characteristics but eliminating inessentials ... One is simplifying all the time. It's a lot easier to put everything in. The difficult part is seeing how much you can leave out." At this time, Organ also painted the composer Michael Tippett. The portraits of Muggeridge and Tippett, along with a number of studies, were both included in Organ's first exhibition at the Redfern Gallery, which took place in March 1967.

While Organ is best known for his portraits of notable figures and of members of the British royal family, he has also created a diverse body of work outside this subject. These include his lithographs of birds and animals such as "Four Birds" (1977), "Four Heads of Wild Cats" (1974), and "Monarch of the Glen after Landseer" (1974).

Organ's landscapes in public collections include Hotel Timeo (1975) and Sicilian Window, as well as his reinterpretation of the John Everett Millais's Ophelia, Ophelia, 1974.

== Notable portraits ==
Bryan Organ has painted significant portraits throughout his career, including the official portraits of the last three Chancellors of the University of Oxford (Harold Macmillan, Roy Jenkins, and Chris Patten). Organ was also the first artist outside of France to be commissioned to paint a French president (François Mitterrand, 1984).

Famous public figures he has painted include Elton John (1973, Acrylic on canvas 152 x 152 cm) and, more recently, Sir David Attenborough (2016, acrylic on canvas 102 x 152). The latter was unveiled by Attenborough at Leicester's New Walk Museum & Art Gallery, in which it hangs next to Organ's portrait of Sir David's brother, Sir Richard Attenborough ("Sir Richard Attenborough", 1985–86).

In 1970, Organ was commissioned by Lincoln's Inn to paint a portrait of Princess Margaret, HRH The Princess Margaret, in which the Princess was Royal Bencher. Organ only agreed to undertake the commission if he was given complete artistic freedom. He is quoted as saying: "My thought was that royal portraits have stood still for a very long time, that this is 1970 and that it was time to paint a Princess in a way that reflected the age she lived in. So I said yes on the condition that there were no restrictions." The painting was unveiled at the National Portrait Gallery in August 1970 to a storm of publicity, in time for the Princess's 40th birthday. The portrait proved highly controversial and was described by The New York Times as "sombre". Princess Margaret herself praised the piece for accurately conveying her way of life.

Organ's portrait of Prince Charles was commissioned by the Trustees of the National Portrait Gallery in 1980. This was the inaugural work in the Gallery's programme of commissioning portraits and is the first painted portrait of the Prince to enter the National Portrait Gallery.

In 1981, Organ was commissioned by the National Portrait Gallery to paint Diana, Princess of Wales. She is depicted seated in the Yellow Drawing Room at Buckingham Palace. This is the only official portrait of the Princess. Prince Charles and Lady Diana were said to be "very pleased" with the portrait, which was completed and displayed just before their marriage). The paintings of Charles and Diana were described by the National Portrait Gallery's Director John Hayes as "a breakthrough in royal portraiture", as they showed a sharp contrast to the Gallery's collection of more traditional portraits of kings and queens. Without the adornments of crowns and elegant finery, these paintings offered a "subtle celebration of the modesty of a modern prince and monarchy", according to Tristram Hunt.

After its unveiling at the National Portrait Gallery, Princess Diana's portrait was slashed by a Northern Irish protester (29 August 1981). Paul Salmon, a Belfast student aged 20, lunged past guards and cut a diagonal slash in the painting, which ripped all the way down to the frame; he is quoted as saying: "I did it for Ireland." Salmon later pleaded guilty to a charge of "causing criminal damage", was sentenced to 6 months in prison and ordered to pay for the painting's restoration.

== Personal life ==
Organ was married to the artist, teacher and gallery owner Elizabeth Organ. Elizabeth supported his art while they were married; they were divorced in 1981.
