= Diana, Princess of Wales (Bryan Organ portrait) =

1981 painting by Bryan Organ

- Artist: Bryan Organ
- Year: 1981
- Type: Portrait
- Medium: Acrylic on canvas
- Dimensions: 177.8 cm × 127 cm (70.0 in × 50 in)
- Location: National Portrait Gallery; London

Diana, Princess of Wales is a 1981 painting of Diana, Princess of Wales, by the British artist Bryan Organ. It was commissioned by the National Portrait Gallery in London following Diana's engagement to Charles, Prince of Wales, in February 1981 while the gallery was under the directorship of John Hayes. It presently hangs as part of the National Portrait Gallery's permanent collection.

The painting was seen by an estimated 100,000 visitors to the gallery in the time between its unveiling and the wedding of Prince Charles and Lady Diana Spencer three days later.

== Description ==
The painting consists of acrylic paint on canvas and measures 177.8 cm × 127 cm. The portrait depicts Diana sitting on a chair in the Yellow Drawing Room of Buckingham Palace dressed in a trouser suit and an open necked blouse. It was painted at the time of Diana's engagement to Charles, Prince of Wales and commissioned to accompany the National Portrait Gallery's painting of Charles which had been completed by Organ in 1980. The frame of the portrait is a large 'hockey frame' finished in English gold leaf that cost £431.25. It was made by Michael Carleton and is identical to the frame for the portrait of Prince Charles.

== 1981 attack ==
In August 1981 the portrait was vandalized by Paul Salmon, a 20-year-old man from Northern Ireland. The portrait was slashed down the middle of the canvas in the attack. Portraits of Queen Elizabeth and Prince Charles were subsequently temporarily removed from public display. The painting was restored and put back on public display behind a plastic covering.

Salmon stepped over a rope and cut the painting without saying anything, though guards at the gallery later claimed that he said "I did it for Ireland". An eyewitness said that "The whole of the middle was ripped out. He was still hanging onto the canvas when the security guards grabbed him". After being held in custody after being denied bail Salmon pleaded guilty to a charge of causing criminal damage and was sentenced to 6 months in prison and ordered to pay $1,900 towards the painting's restoration.

The trustee of the National Portrait Gallery Lord Kenyon said of the damage that "There is a horizontal slash across the picture and a vertical cut which runs a long way from head to foot. But today, techniques of art restoration are very sophisticated" Organ commented that he was "...just very sad and very disillusioned by what has happened...I don't understand it".

== Reception ==
John Cooper writing in 2009 described the portrait as "striking an informal pose within a tight geometric setting" and that it is "relatively informal and utterly devoid of royal regalia". Officials from the National Portrait Gallery hailed the painting as a "portrait of the '80s" at its unveiling. Contemporary commentary focused on the depiction of Diana in trousers, then a novelty for a female member of the British royal family. In his book Eyewitnessing: The Uses of Images as Historical Evidence, Peter Burke describes the crossing of Diana's legs as taken as 'normal' in contrast to the shocked reaction of people to Thomas Gainsborough's 1760 portrait of the musician and singer Anne Ford.

In his entry for the 2002 book Great Britons: The Great Debate, John Cooper wrote of the portrait that "In different circumstances she would have grown older and more regal, the subject of dozens of dignified, official portrait paintings. The National Portrait Gallery would have collected a series of canvases milestoning her advancing years...Bryan Organ's portrait stands alone, and now seems to symbolise the world from which she escaped, the tight frame of the background prophetically constricting."

Following Diana's death in 1997 Vanessa Thorpe wrote in The Independent that "This week, Organ's picture of the teenage bride-to-be has never looked more pathetic, yet it is perhaps more poignant still to contemplate the details of a portrait that will now never be".

Niall MacMonagle writing in 2014 in the Irish Independent wrote that "She was "Shy Di", still a teenager, when this portrait, by Bryan Organ, was painted. Diana...must have wondered what she was letting herself in for, what was all before her. And she didn't know the half of it. The plumpish cheeks, the big hair, the crossed legs in tailored trousers, the sideways and elegant chair, the ornate classical backdrop combine the traditional and contemporary...Now we know it all, the whole sorry mess. The disappointments, the broken hearts, the affairs. In Roman mythology Diana was the virgin goddess of hunting; in the end, this Diana, modern and unfortunate, was the one hunted and hounded. A victim of circumstance, a prisoner in a gilded cage. She broke free but she never managed to escape."
