= Prince Philip, Duke of Edinburgh (Bryan Organ portrait) =

1983 painting by Bryan Organ

- Artist: Bryan Organ
- Year: 1983
- Type: Portrait
- Medium: Acrylic on canvas
- Dimensions: 127.0 cm × 127.0 cm (50.0 in × 50.0 in)
- Location: National Portrait Gallery; London

Prince Philip, Duke of Edinburgh, is a 1983 painting of Prince Philip, Duke of Edinburgh, by the British artist Bryan Organ.

== History ==
It was commissioned by the National Portrait Gallery in London. It is the first portrait painting of Philip to enter the National Portrait Gallery. Organ had previously produce portraits of other members of the British royal family, including Princess Margaret, Prince Charles, and Diana, Princess of Wales.

The portrait of was officially commissioned by the trustees of the National Portrait Gallery in 1983. It was the first painting of Philip to join a national collection and the only to be displayed publicly at the time. In 2018 and to mark the 70th birthday of Philip's eldest son, Prince Charles, sketches from his personal art collection went on display, including a pencil sketch Organ had produced of Philip in preparation for his portrait.
