= The Queen (Justin Mortimer portrait) =

1997 painting by Justin Mortimer

- Artist: Justin Mortimer
- Year: 1997
- Subject: Queen Elizabeth II

The Queen is a 1997 portrait by the English painter Justin Mortimer of Queen Elizabeth II. The portrait was commissioned by the Royal Society of the Arts to mark their 50th anniversary of association with the Queen, and hangs in their headquarters. It was officially unveiled in May 1998. The portrait was initially displayed to the public for five days in January 1998 at the Business Design Centre in Islington, north London.

The Wall Street Journal wrote that Mortimer's portrait depicts Elizabeth "...set against an acidic yellow background with her head floating away from her body". The yellow background references the Yellow Drawing Room at Buckingham Palace where Elizabeth sits for portraits, and where she posed for Mortimer. The isolated head was not intended by Mortimer to be a comment of the British royal family's historical use of decapitation as punishment, with Mortimer feeling that Elizabeth was "from another era...I don't have anything in common with her apart from being English". Mortimer said in painting the portrait he "wanted to get away from the royal aspect and paint a picture of a person rather than the Queen...It means people can focus more on the abstract quality of the painting and get away from the normal paintings of royalty, where everything is intact and, dare I say it, sycophantic."

The curator of the 2012 National Portrait Gallery exhibition The Queen: Art and Image, Paul Moorhouse, said that Mortimer's portrait was "...fitting with the atmosphere at the time...people were asking, 'What is she for? What does she represent?'" The portrait was seen in the public dissatisfaction that surrounded the monarchy in the aftermath of the death of Diana, Princess of Wales. In an interview with the Wall Street Journal, Mortimer said that Elizabeth "...recognizes that it is part of her role as monarch to be represented by all different kinds of portraitists...She went along with it knowing that she would get a very unconventional result." Elizabeth subsequently commissioned a portrait of the Lord Chamberlain from Mortimer.
