= Buckingham Palace swimming pool =

Private swimming pool in London, England

Coordinates: 51.501179°N 0.143792°W

The swimming pool at Buckingham Palace was built in 1938. It was converted from the northwest pavilion, designed by John Nash as a conservatory.

The pool was built in 1938, commissioned by George VI. The young Princesses Elizabeth (later Elizabeth II) and Margaret were enthusiastic swimmers. The pool was rebuilt after suffering bombing damage during the London Blitz in September 1940. Prince Philip, Duke of Edinburgh and Michael Parker were once locked in the pool having gone for a swim after a late dinner. The three-year-old Prince Charles (later Charles III) would be thrown into the pool by his father, Prince Philip, against the protestations of his nurse, Helen Lightbody.

Charles and his siblings, Princess Anne, Prince Andrew and Prince Edward all learnt to swim in the pool as children. Prince George, Princess Charlotte and Prince Louis, the children of the Prince and Princess of Wales, William and Catherine, also learnt to swim in the pool before their move to Windsor.

The temperature of the pool was reduced in 2023 by order of Charles. Charles aims to achieve net-zero emissions from the buildings of the Royal household before the British government's target date of 2050. Charles reportedly prefers swimming in the sea.

The pool is permitted to be used by senior members of the royal household who must check in advance if royal family members are planning to swim. If staff members are swimming and a member of the royal family appears, they must get out of the pool, although they are very often invited to remain swimming. Staff members will not attempt to join royals if they are already swimming, however.

The exterior of the pool is covered with darkened glass to ensure privacy. No publicly available photographs exist of the interior of the swimming pool. It has been described as "basic" by a former royal aide. It is rectangular and has no loungers.

== Sources ==
- Allison, Ronald; Riddell, Sarah, eds. (1991). The Royal Encyclopedia. London: Macmillan. ISBN 978-0-3335-3810-4.
