= Prince Charles (Bryan Organ portrait) =

1980 painting by Bryan Organ

- Artist: Bryan Organ
- Year: 1980
- Type: Portrait
- Medium: Acrylic on canvas
- Dimensions: 177.8 cm × 178.2 cm (70.0 in × 70.2 in)
- Location: National Portrait Gallery; London

Prince Charles, later retitled King Charles III, is a 1980 painting of Charles III when Prince of Wales, by the British artist Bryan Organ. It was commissioned by the National Portrait Gallery (NPG) in London. It is the first portrait painting of Charles to enter the NPG. Organ would later produce portraits of Charles's first wife Diana, Princess of Wales, and his father Prince Philip, Duke of Edinburgh.

== Description ==
The idea for the portrait was first put forward in September 1979 and Prince Charles met with Bryan Organ in November of the same year. Organ had previously painted a portrait of the subject's aunt, Princess Margaret, in 1970 which had received mixed reviews. The portrait of was officially commissioned by the trustees of the National Portrait Gallery in 1980. This was the inaugural work in the Gallery's programme of commissioning portraits and is the first painted portrait of the Prince to enter the National Portrait Gallery. The modern-style portrait depicts Charles in a relaxed pose sat a blue wooden chair and in his polo clothes, including green trousers, knee high black boots and a blue sweatshirt over a white collared shirt. The Union Jack can be seen flying at the top behind a green fence. In at least one sketch that was done before work on the portrait began, Organ depicts Charles with a slight smile which is missing from the finished painting.
