= Buckingham Palace =

Administrative headquarters of the British monarch

Coordinates: 51°30′3″N 0°8′31″W

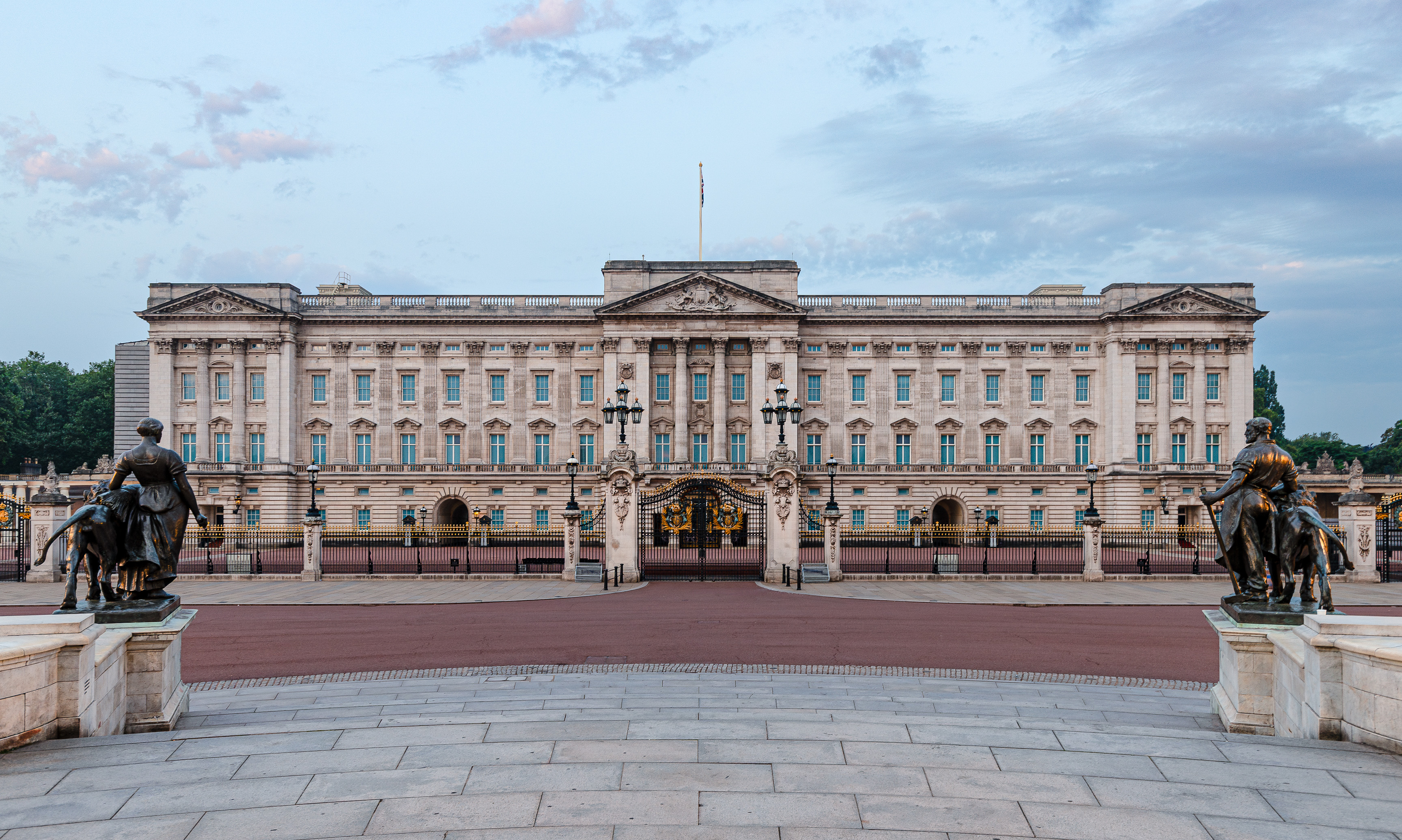
East Front of the palace seen from the Victoria Memorial

Buckingham Palace (UK: /ˈbʌkɪŋəm/) is the official residence and administrative headquarters of the monarch of the United Kingdom in London, England. (Note: By tradition, the British Royal Court is officially resident at St James's Palace, which means that, while foreign ambassadors assuming their new position are received by the British sovereign at Buckingham Palace, they are accredited to the "Court of St James's Palace". This anomaly continues for the sake of tradition, as Buckingham Palace is to all intents and purposes the official residence. See History of St James's Palace (Official website of the British Monarchy).) Located in the City of Westminster, the palace is often at the centre of state occasions and royal hospitality. It has been a focal point for the British people at times of national rejoicing and mourning.

Originally known as Buckingham House, the building at the core of today's palace was a large townhouse built for the Duke of Buckingham and Normanby in 1703 on a site that had been in private ownership for at least 150 years. It was acquired by George III in 1761 as a private residence for Queen Charlotte and became known as The Queen's House. In the early 19th century it was enlarged by the architects John Nash and Edward Blore, who constructed three wings around a central courtyard. Buckingham Palace became the London residence of the British monarch on the accession of Queen Victoria in June 1837. It was occupied by every subsequent monarch until the accession in 2022 of Charles III, who continues to reside at nearby Clarence House while conducting official duties at the palace.

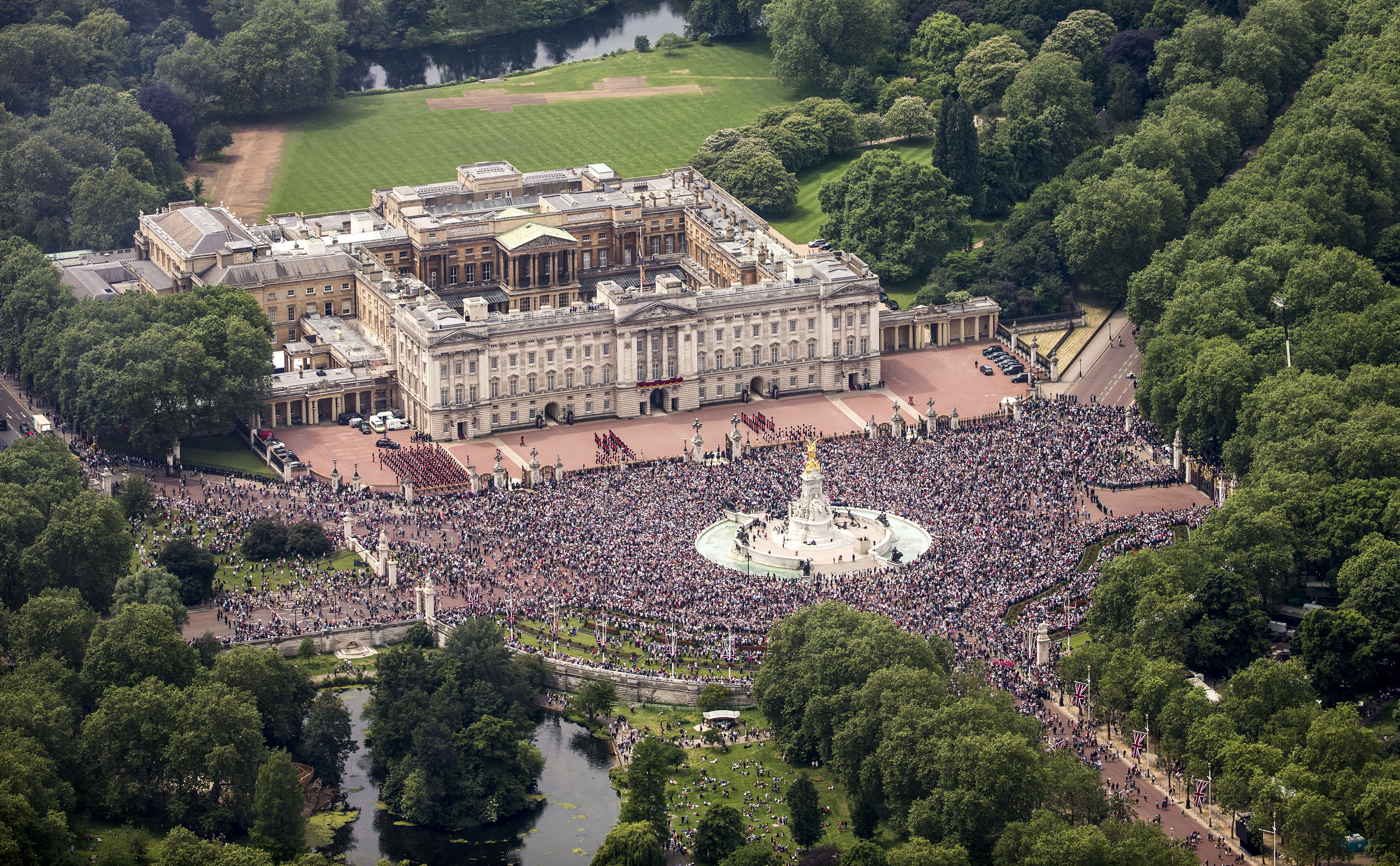
Aerial view of the palace during Elizabeth II's 90th birthday celebrations in 2016

The last major structural additions were made in the late 19th and early 20th centuries, including the East Front, which contains the balcony on which the royal family traditionally appears to greet crowds. A German bomb destroyed the palace chapel during the Second World War; the King's Gallery was built on the site and opened to the public in 1962 to exhibit works of art from the Royal Collection.

The original early-19th-century interior designs, many of which survive, include widespread use of brightly coloured scagliola and blue and pink lapis, on the advice of Charles Long. Edward VII oversaw a partial redecoration in a Belle Époque cream and gold colour scheme. Many smaller reception rooms are furnished in the Chinese regency style with furniture and fittings brought from the Royal Pavilion at Brighton and from Carlton House. The palace has 775 rooms, and the garden is the largest private garden in London. The state rooms, used for official and state entertaining, are open to the public each year for most of the summer and on selected days in winter and spring.

== History ==
=== Pre-1624 ===
In the Middle Ages, the site of the future palace formed part of the Manor of Ebury (also called Eia). The marshy ground was watered by the river Tyburn, which still flows below the courtyard and south wing of the palace. Where the river was fordable (at Cow Ford), the village of Eye Cross grew. Ownership of the site changed hands many times; owners included Edward the Confessor and Edith of Wessex in late Saxon times, and, after the Norman Conquest, William the Conqueror. William gave the site to Geoffrey de Mandeville, who bequeathed it to the monks of Westminster Abbey. (Note: The topography of the site and its ownership are dealt with in Wright, chapters 1–4.)

In 1531, Henry VIII acquired the Hospital of St James, which became St James's Palace, from Eton College, and in 1536 he took the Manor of Ebury from Westminster Abbey. These transfers brought the site of Buckingham Palace back into royal hands for the first time since William the Conqueror had given it away almost 500 years earlier. Various owners leased it from royal landlords, and the freehold was the subject of frenzied speculation during the 17th century. By then, the old village of Eye Cross had long since fallen into decay, and the area was mostly wasteland. Needing money, James VI and I sold off part of the Crown freehold but retained part of the site on which he established a four-acre (1.6 ha) mulberry garden for the production of silk. (This is at the north-west corner of today's palace.) Clement Walker in Anarchia Anglicana (1649) refers to "new-erected sodoms and spintries at the Mulberry Garden at S. James's"; this suggests it may have been a place of debauchery. Eventually, in the late 17th century, the freehold was inherited from the property tycoon Hugh Audley by the great heiress Mary Davies. (Note: Audley and Davies were key figures in the development of Ebury Manor and also the Grosvenor Estate (see dukes of Westminster), which still exists today. They are remembered in the street names North Audley Street, South Audley Street, and Davies Street, all in Mayfair.)

=== First houses on the site (1624–1761) ===
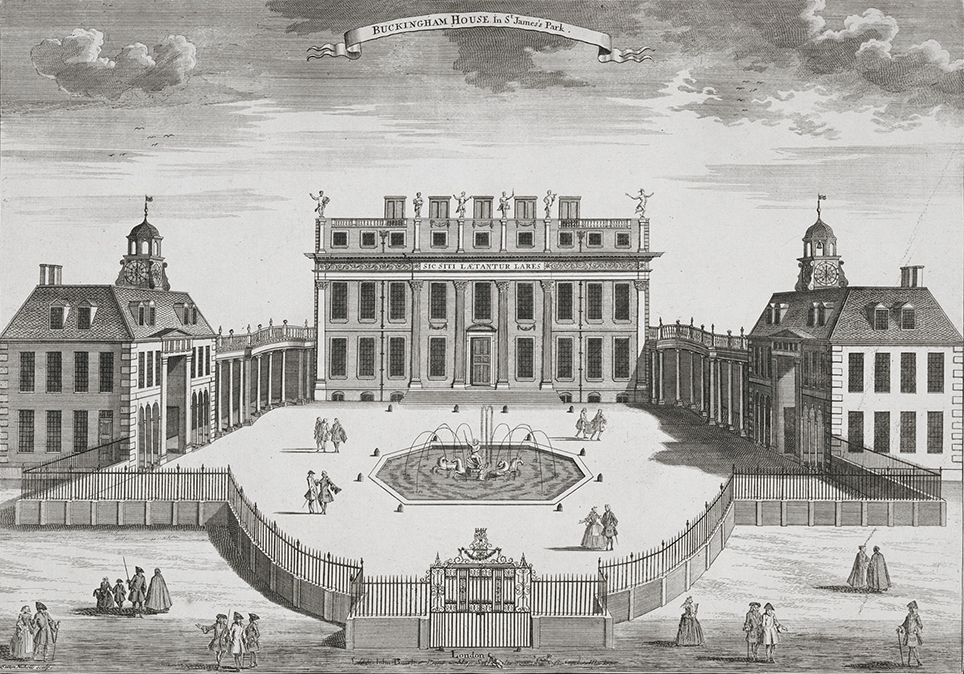
Engraving of Buckingham House, c. 1725

Possibly the first house erected within the site was that of William Blake, around 1624. The next owner was George Goring, 1st Earl of Norwich, who from 1633 extended Blake's house, which came to be known as Goring House, and developed much of today's garden, then known as Goring Great Garden. He did not, however, obtain the freehold interest in the mulberry garden. Unbeknown to Goring, in 1640 the interest "failed to pass the Great Seal before Charles I fled London, which it needed to do for legal execution". It was this critical omission that would help the British royal family regain the freehold under George III. When the improvident Goring defaulted on his rents, Henry Bennet, 1st Earl of Arlington was able to purchase the lease of Goring House and he was occupying it when it burned down in 1674, following which he constructed Arlington House on the site – the location of the southern wing of today's palace – the next year. In 1698, John Sheffield acquired the lease. He later became the first Duke of Buckingham and Normanby. Buckingham House was built for Sheffield in 1703 to the design of William Winde. The style chosen was of a large, three-floored central block with two smaller flanking service wings. It was eventually sold by Buckingham's illegitimate son, Charles Sheffield, in 1761 to George III for £21,000. (Note: The purchase price is given by Wright p. 142 as £28,000.) Sheffield's leasehold on the mulberry garden site, the freehold of which was still owned by the royal family, was due to expire in 1774.

=== From Queen's House to palace (1761–1837) ===
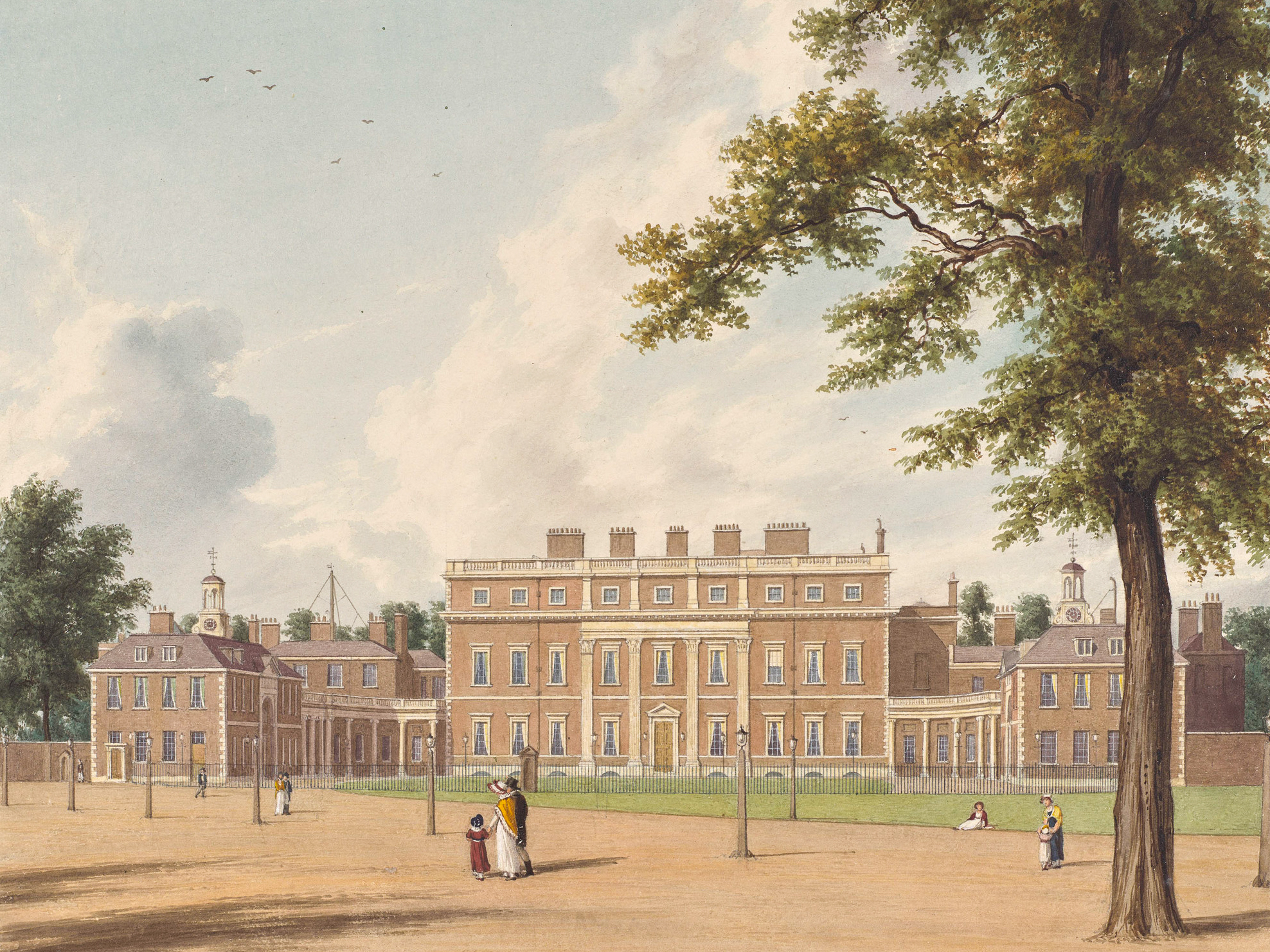
The house in 1819, by William Westall

Under the new royal ownership, the building was originally intended as a private retreat for Queen Charlotte, and was accordingly known as The Queen's House. Remodelling of the structure began in 1762. In 1775, an Act of Parliament settled the property on Queen Charlotte, in exchange for her rights to nearby Old Somerset House, and 14 of her 15 children were born there. Some furnishings were transferred from Carlton House and others had been bought in France after the French Revolution of 1789. While St James's Palace remained the official and ceremonial royal residence, (Note: The tradition persists of foreign ambassadors being formally accredited to "the Court of St James's", even though it is at Buckingham Palace that they present their credentials and staff to the monarch upon their appointment.) the name "Buckingham Palace" was used from at least 1791.

After his accession to the throne in 1820, George IV continued the renovation, intending to create a small, comfortable home. However, in 1826, while the work was in progress, the King decided to modify the house into a palace with the help of his architect John Nash. The façade was designed with George IV's preference for French neoclassical architecture in mind. The cost of the renovations grew dramatically, and by 1829 the extravagance of Nash's designs resulted in his removal as the architect. On the death of George IV in 1830, his younger brother William IV hired Edward Blore to finish the work. William never moved into the palace, preferring Clarence House, which had been built to his specifications and which had been his London home while he was heir presumptive. After the Palace of Westminster was destroyed by fire in 1834, he offered to convert Buckingham Palace into a new Houses of Parliament, but his offer was declined.

=== Queen Victoria (1837–1901) ===
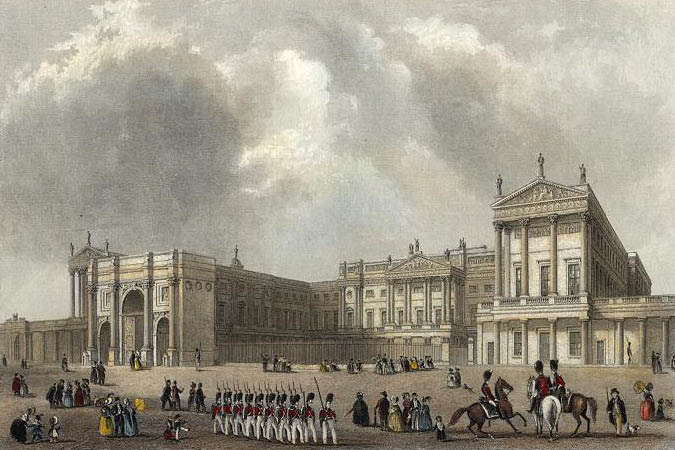
Buckingham Palace c. 1837, showing Marble Arch at left, a ceremonial entrance. It was moved next to Hyde Park to make way for the new east wing in 1847.

Buckingham Palace became the principal royal residence in 1837, on the accession of Queen Victoria, who was the first monarch to reside there. While the state rooms were a riot of gilt and colour, the necessities of the new palace were somewhat less luxurious. The chimneys were said to smoke so much that the fires had to be allowed to die down, and consequently the palace was often cold. Ventilation was so poor that the interior had a foul smell, and when it was decided to install gas lamps, there was a serious worry about the build-up of gas on the lower floors. It was also said that the staff were lax and lazy and the palace was dirty. Following the Queen's marriage in 1840, her husband, Prince Albert, concerned himself with a reorganisation of the household offices and staff, and with addressing the design faults of the palace. By the end of 1840, all the problems had been rectified. However, the builders were to return within a decade.

By 1847, the couple found the palace too small for court life and their growing family and a new wing, designed by Edward Blore, was built by Thomas Cubitt, enclosing the central quadrangle. The work, carried out from 1847 to 1849, was paid for by the sale of Brighton Pavilion in 1850. The large East Front, facing The Mall, is today the "public face" of Buckingham Palace and contains the balcony from which the royal family acknowledge the crowds on momentous occasions and after the annual Trooping the Colour. The ballroom wing and a further suite of state rooms were also built in this period, designed by Nash's student James Pennethorne. Before Prince Albert's death, in addition to royal ceremonies, investitures and presentations Buckingham Palace was frequently the scene of lavish costume balls and musical entertainments. The most celebrated contemporary musicians entertained there; for example Felix Mendelssohn is known to have played there on three occasions, and Johann Strauss II and his orchestra played there when in England.

Widowed in 1861, the grief-stricken Queen withdrew from public life and left Buckingham Palace to live at Windsor Castle, Balmoral Castle and Osborne House. For many years the palace was seldom used, even neglected. In 1864, a note was found pinned to the fence, saying: "These commanding premises to be let or sold, in consequence of the late occupant's declining business." Eventually, public opinion persuaded the Queen to return to London, though even then she preferred to live elsewhere whenever possible. Court functions were still held at Windsor Castle, presided over by the sombre Queen habitually dressed in mourning black, while Buckingham Palace remained shuttered for most of the year.

=== Early 20th century ===
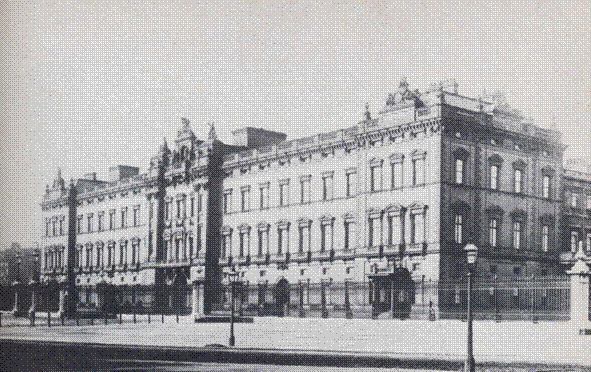
The east wing public façade in 1910. Enclosing the courtyard, it was completed in 1850 and remodelled to its present form in 1913.

In 1901, the new king, Edward VII, began redecorating the palace. He and his wife, Queen Alexandra, had always been at the forefront of London high society, and their friends, known as "the Marlborough House Set", were considered to be the most eminent and fashionable of the age. Buckingham Palace – the Ballroom, Grand Entrance, Marble Hall, Grand Staircase, vestibules and galleries were redecorated in the Belle Époque cream and gold colour scheme they retain today – once again became a setting for entertaining on a majestic scale but leading John Martin Robinson to feel Edward's heavy redecorations were at odds with Nash's original work.

The last major building work took place during the reign of George V when, in 1913, Aston Webb redesigned Blore's 1850 East Front to resemble in part Giacomo Leoni's Lyme Park in Cheshire. This new refaced principal façade (of Portland stone) was designed to be the backdrop to the Victoria Memorial, a large memorial statue of Queen Victoria created by sculptor Thomas Brock, erected outside the main gates on a surround constructed by architect Aston Webb. George V, who had succeeded Edward VII in 1910, had a more serious personality than his father; greater emphasis was now placed on official entertainment and royal duties than on lavish parties. He arranged a series of command performances featuring jazz musicians such as the Original Dixieland Jazz Band (1919; the first jazz performance for a head of state), Sidney Bechet and Louis Armstrong (1932), which earned the palace a nomination in 2009 for a (Kind of) Blue Plaque by the Brecon Jazz Festival as one of the venues making the greatest contribution to jazz music in the United Kingdom.

During the First World War, which lasted from 1914 until 1918, the palace escaped unscathed. Its more valuable contents were evacuated to Windsor, but the royal family remained in residence. The King imposed rationing at the palace, much to the dismay of his guests and household. To the King's later regret, David Lloyd George persuaded him to go further and ostentatiously lock the wine cellars and refrain from alcohol, to set a good example to the nation. Naval shipbuilders and troops continued to imbibe, and the King was left unhappy at his enforced abstinence.

George V's wife, Queen Mary, was a connoisseur of the arts and took a keen interest in the Royal Collection of furniture and art, both restoring and adding to it. Queen Mary also had many new fixtures and fittings installed, such as the pair of marble Empire style chimneypieces by Benjamin Vulliamy, dating from 1810, in the ground floor Bow Room, the huge low room at the centre of the garden façade. Queen Mary was also responsible for the decoration of the Blue Drawing Room. This room, 69 feet (21 metres) long, previously known as the South Drawing Room, has a ceiling designed by Nash, coffered with huge gilt console brackets. In 1938, the northwest pavilion, designed by Nash as a conservatory, was converted into a swimming pool.

==== Second World War ====
External videos
- Buckingham Palace Bombed (1940) – Newsreel of damage to the palace and chapel (1:08)

During the Second World War, which broke out in 1939, the palace was bombed nine times. The most serious and publicised incident destroyed the palace chapel in 1940. One bomb fell in the palace quadrangle while George VI and Queen Elizabeth (the future Queen Mother) were in the palace, and many windows were blown in and the chapel destroyed. The King and Queen were filmed inspecting their bombed home, and the newsreel footage shown in cinemas throughout the United Kingdom to show the common suffering of rich and poor. As The Sunday Graphic reported:

By the Editor: The King and Queen have endured the ordeal which has come to their subjects. For the second time a German bomber has tried to bring death and destruction to the home of Their Majesties ... When this war is over the common danger which King George and Queen Elizabeth have shared with their people will be a cherished memory and an inspiration through the years.

It was at this time the Queen famously declared: "I'm glad we have been bombed. Now I can look the East End in the face".

On 15 September 1940, known as Battle of Britain Day, an RAF pilot, Ray Holmes of No. 504 Squadron, rammed a German Dornier Do 17 bomber he believed was going to bomb the palace. Holmes had run out of ammunition to shoot down the bomber and made the quick decision to ram it. He bailed out and the bomber crashed into the forecourt of London Victoria station. Its engine was later exhibited at the Imperial War Museum in London. Holmes became a King's Messenger after the war and died at the age of 90 in 2005.

On VE Day – 8 May 1945 – the palace was the centre of British celebrations. The King, the Queen, Princess Elizabeth (the future queen) and Princess Margaret appeared on the balcony, with the palace's blacked-out windows behind them, to cheers from a vast crowd in The Mall. The damaged palace was carefully restored after the war by John Mowlem & Co.

=== Mid-20th century onwards ===
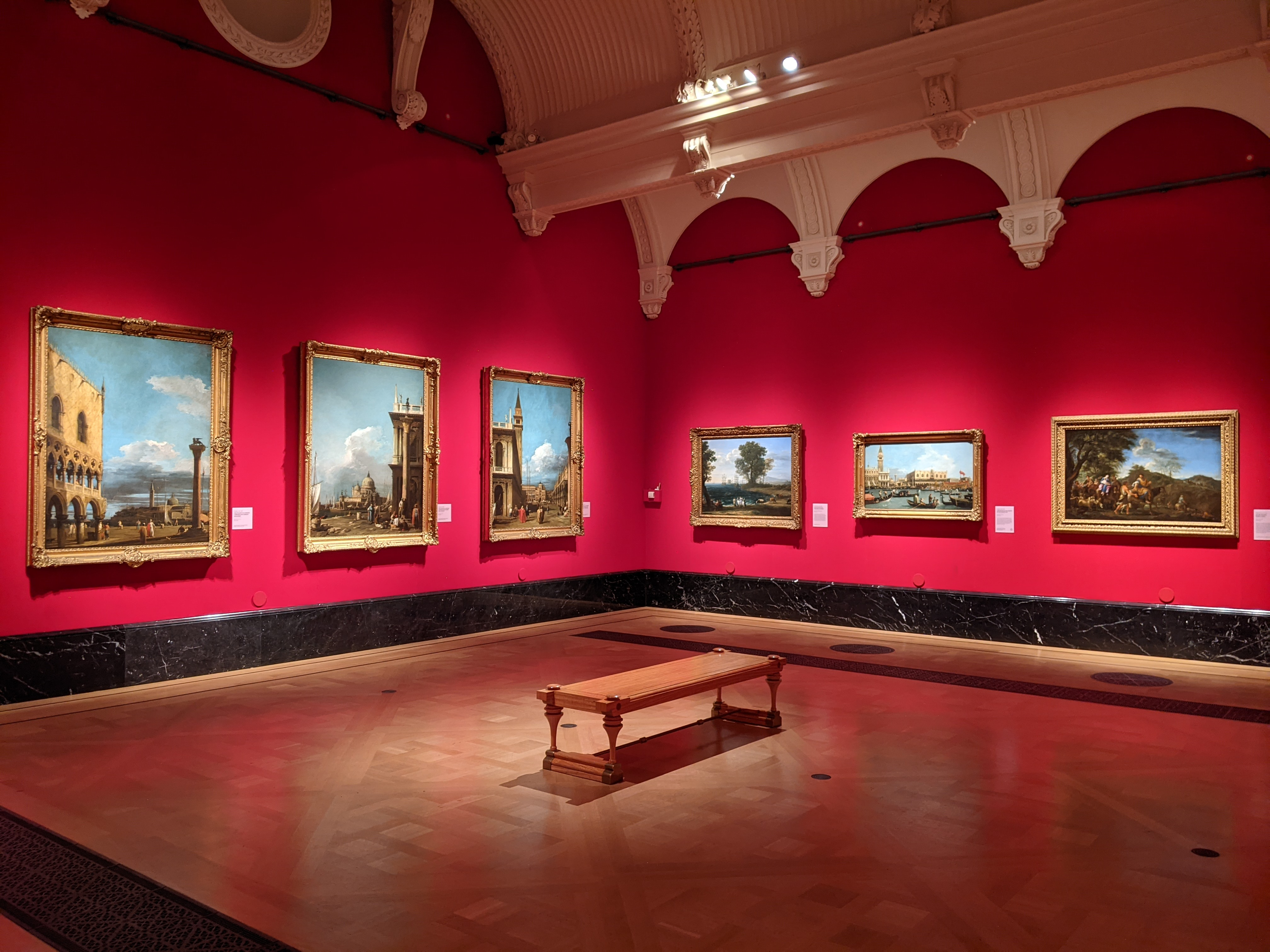
Paintings by Canaletto and Claude Lorrain exhibited at the gallery in 2021

Many of the palace's contents are part of the Royal Collection; they can, on occasion, be viewed by the public at the King's Gallery, near the Royal Mews. The purpose-built gallery opened in 1962 and displays a changing selection of items from the collection. It occupies the site of the chapel that was destroyed in the Second World War. The palace was designated a Grade I listed building in 1970. Its state rooms have been open to the public during summer and on selected dates throughout the year since 1993. The money raised in admission fees was originally put towards the rebuilding of Windsor Castle after the 1992 fire devastated many of its staterooms. It now funds the conservation of Royal Collection artwork. In the year to 31 March 2025, 683,000 people visited the palace, and 174,000 visited the gallery.

The palace used to racially segregate staff. In 1968, Charles Tryon, 2nd Baron Tryon, acting as treasurer to Queen Elizabeth II, sought to exempt Buckingham Palace from full application of the Race Relations Act 1968. He stated that the palace did not hire people of colour for clerical jobs, only as domestic servants. He arranged with civil servants for an exemption that meant that complaints of racism against the royal household would be sent directly to the Home Secretary and kept out of the legal system.

The palace, like Windsor Castle, is owned by the reigning monarch in right of the Crown. Occupied royal palaces do not form part of the Crown Estate, nor are they the monarch's personal property, unlike Sandringham House and Balmoral Castle. The UK Government is responsible for maintaining the palace in exchange for receiving the profits made by the Crown Estate. In 2015, the State Dining Room was closed for a year and a half because its ceiling had become potentially dangerous. A 10-year schedule of maintenance work, including new plumbing, wiring, boilers and radiators, and the installation of solar panels on the roof, has been estimated to cost £369 million and was approved by the prime minister in November 2016. It is being funded by a temporary increase in the Sovereign Grant paid from the income of the Crown Estate and is intended to extend the building's working life by at least 50 years. In 2017, the House of Commons backed funding for the project by 464 votes to 56. In addition to utility system upgrades, the project includes roof repairs, asbestos removal, the conversion of disused bedrooms into office space, installation of new lifts and toilets, and improved disabled access. The Royal Household forecasts additional visitor income and utilities savings worth £136 million between 2026 and 2066.

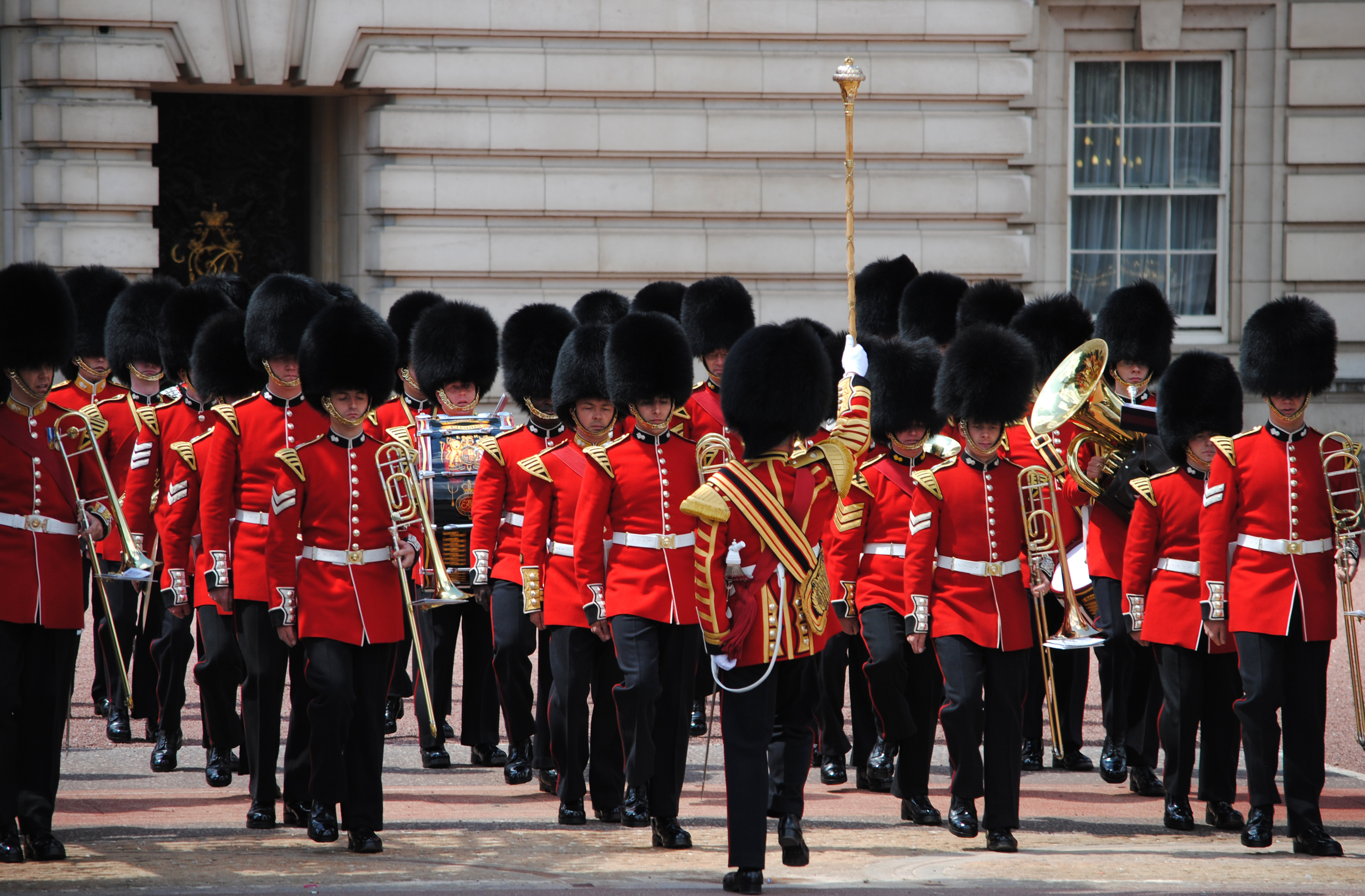
The Band of the Grenadier Guards provides musical accompaniment for the Changing of the Guard ceremony.

Buckingham Palace is a symbol and home of the British monarchy, an art gallery and a tourist attraction. Behind the gilded railings and gates that were completed by the Bromsgrove Guild in 1911, lies Webb's famous façade, which was described in a book published by the Royal Collection Trust as looking "like everybody's idea of a palace". It has not only been a weekday home of Queen Elizabeth II and Prince Philip but was also the London residence and office of the Duke of York until 2023. Prince Edward, Duke of Edinburgh and Sophie, Duchess of Edinburgh continue to have a private apartment in the palace for use when they are in London. The palace also houses their offices, as well as those of the Princess Royal and Princess Alexandra, and is the workplace of more than 700 people. King Charles III and Queen Camilla have chosen to live nearby at Clarence House, although they conduct official business including banquets, audiences and receptions at Buckingham Palace, which remains the monarch's administrative headquarters. Every year, some 50,000 invited guests are entertained at garden parties, receptions, audiences and banquets. Three garden parties are held in the summer. The forecourt of Buckingham Palace is used for the Changing of the Guard, a major ceremony and tourist attraction (daily from April to July; every other day in other months).

== Interior ==
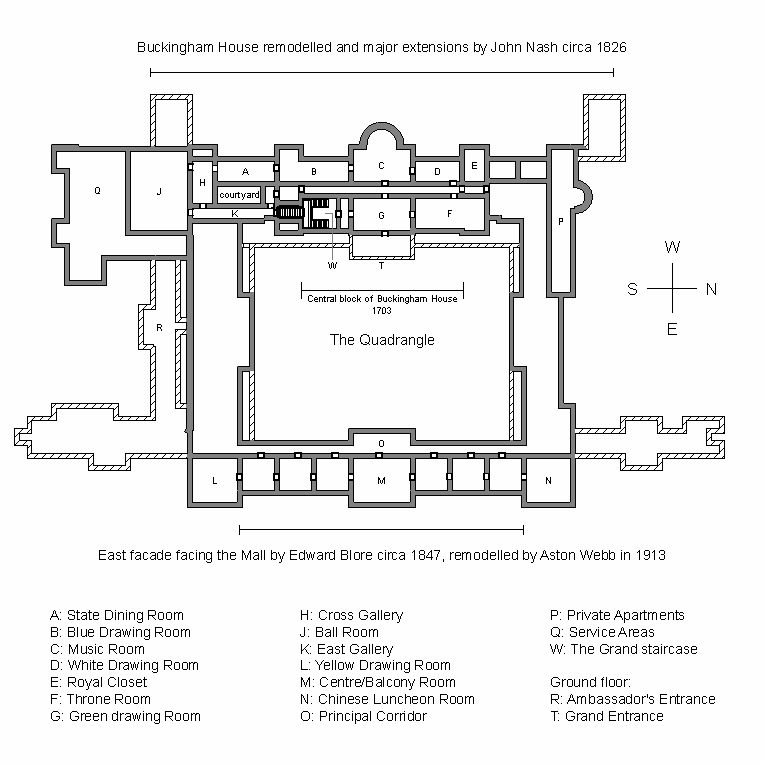
Piano nobile of Buckingham Palace. The areas defined by shaded walls represent lower minor wings. Note: this is an unscaled sketch plan for reference only. Proportions of some rooms may differ slightly in reality.

The front of the palace measures 355 feet (108 m) across, by 390 feet (120 m) deep, by 80 feet (24 m) high and contains over 830,000 square feet (77,000 m^{2}) of floorspace. There are 775 rooms, including 188 staff bedrooms, 92 offices, 78 bathrooms, 52 principal bedrooms and 19 state rooms. The royal family occupy a small suite of private rooms in the north wing. It also has a cinema, swimming pool, doctor's surgery, jeweller's workshop and post office. In the 1960s, under Court Postmaster William King, the Post Office branch included pigeon holes for Master of the Household, Equerry in Waiting, Privy Purse Door, and Sergeant Footman.

=== Principal rooms ===
The principal rooms are contained on the first-floor piano nobile behind the west-facing garden façade at the rear of the palace. The centre of this ornate suite of state rooms is the Music Room, its large bow the dominant feature of the façade. Flanking the Music Room are the Blue and the White Drawing Rooms. At the centre of the suite, serving as a corridor to link the state rooms, is the Picture Gallery, which is top-lit and 55 yards (50 m) long. The Gallery is hung with numerous works including some by Rembrandt, van Dyck, Rubens and Vermeer; other rooms leading from the Picture Gallery are the Throne Room and the Green Drawing Room. The Green Drawing Room serves as a huge anteroom to the Throne Room, and is part of the ceremonial route to the throne from the Guard Room at the top of the Grand Staircase. The Guard Room contains white marble statues of Queen Victoria and Prince Albert, in Roman costume, set in a tribune lined with tapestries. These very formal rooms are used only for ceremonial and official entertaining but are open to the public every summer.

=== Semi-state apartments ===
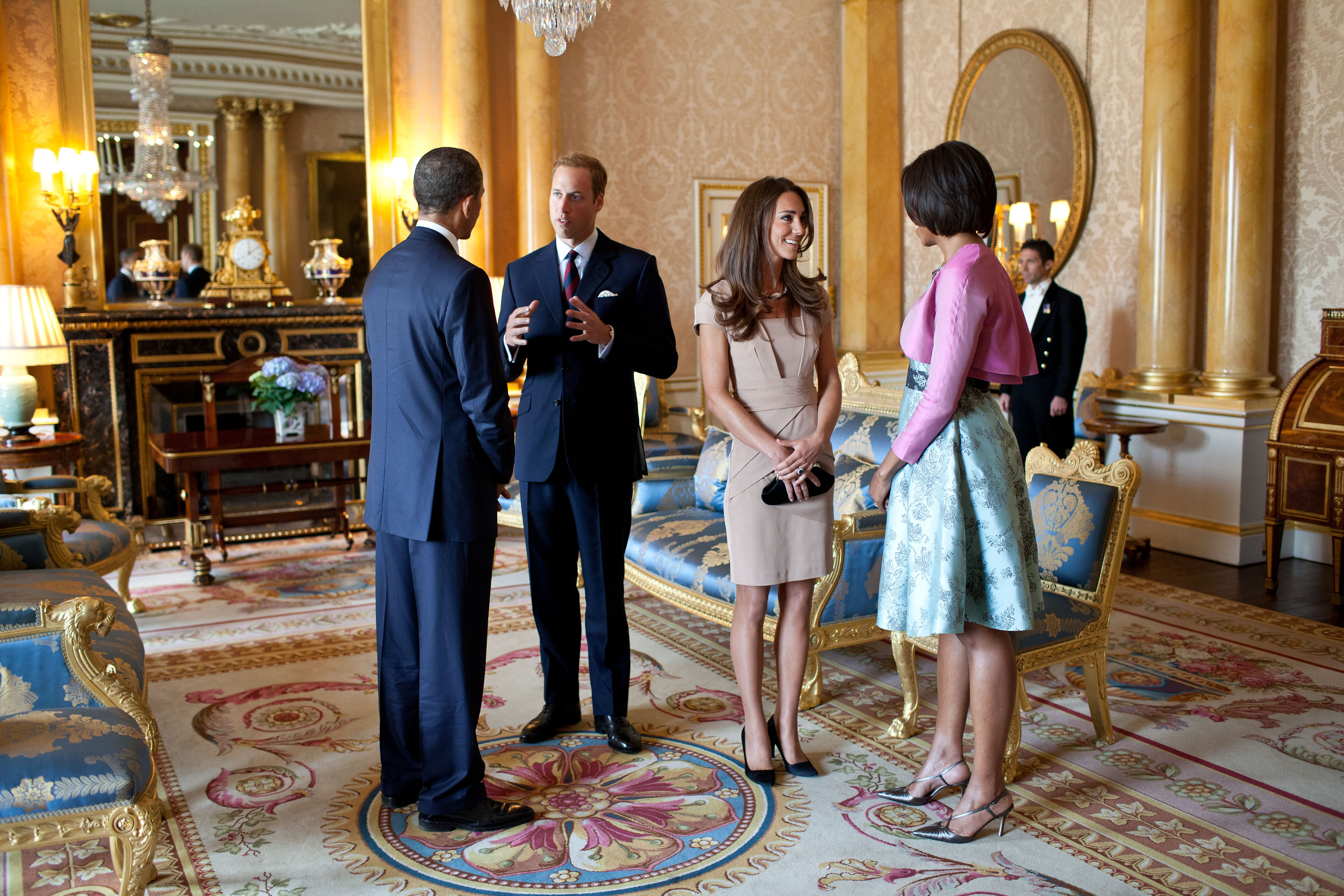
Prince William and his wife Catherine greeting Barack and Michelle Obama in the 1844 room

Directly underneath the state apartments are the less grand semi-state apartments. Opening from the Marble Hall, these rooms are used for less formal entertaining, such as luncheon parties and private audiences. At the centre of this floor is the Bow Room, through which thousands of guests pass annually to the monarch's garden parties. When paying a state visit to Britain, foreign heads of state are usually entertained by the monarch at Buckingham Palace. They are allocated an extensive suite of rooms known as the Belgian Suite, situated at the foot of the Minister's Staircase, on the ground floor of the west-facing Garden Wing. Some of the rooms are named and decorated for particular visitors, such as the 1844 Room, decorated in that year for the state visit of Nicholas I of Russia, and the 1855 Room, in honour of the visit of Napoleon III of France. The former is a sitting room that also serves as an audience room and is often used for personal investitures. Narrow corridors link the rooms of the suite; one of them is given extra height and perspective by saucer domes designed by Nash in the style of Soane. A second corridor in the suite has Gothic-influenced cross-over vaulting. The suite was named after Leopold I of Belgium, uncle of Queen Victoria and Prince Albert. In 1936, the suite briefly became the private apartments of the palace when Edward VIII occupied them. The original early-19th-century interior designs, many of which still survive, included widespread use of brightly coloured scagliola and blue and pink lapis, on the advice of Charles Long. Edward VII oversaw a partial redecoration in a Belle Époque cream and gold colour scheme.

=== East wing ===
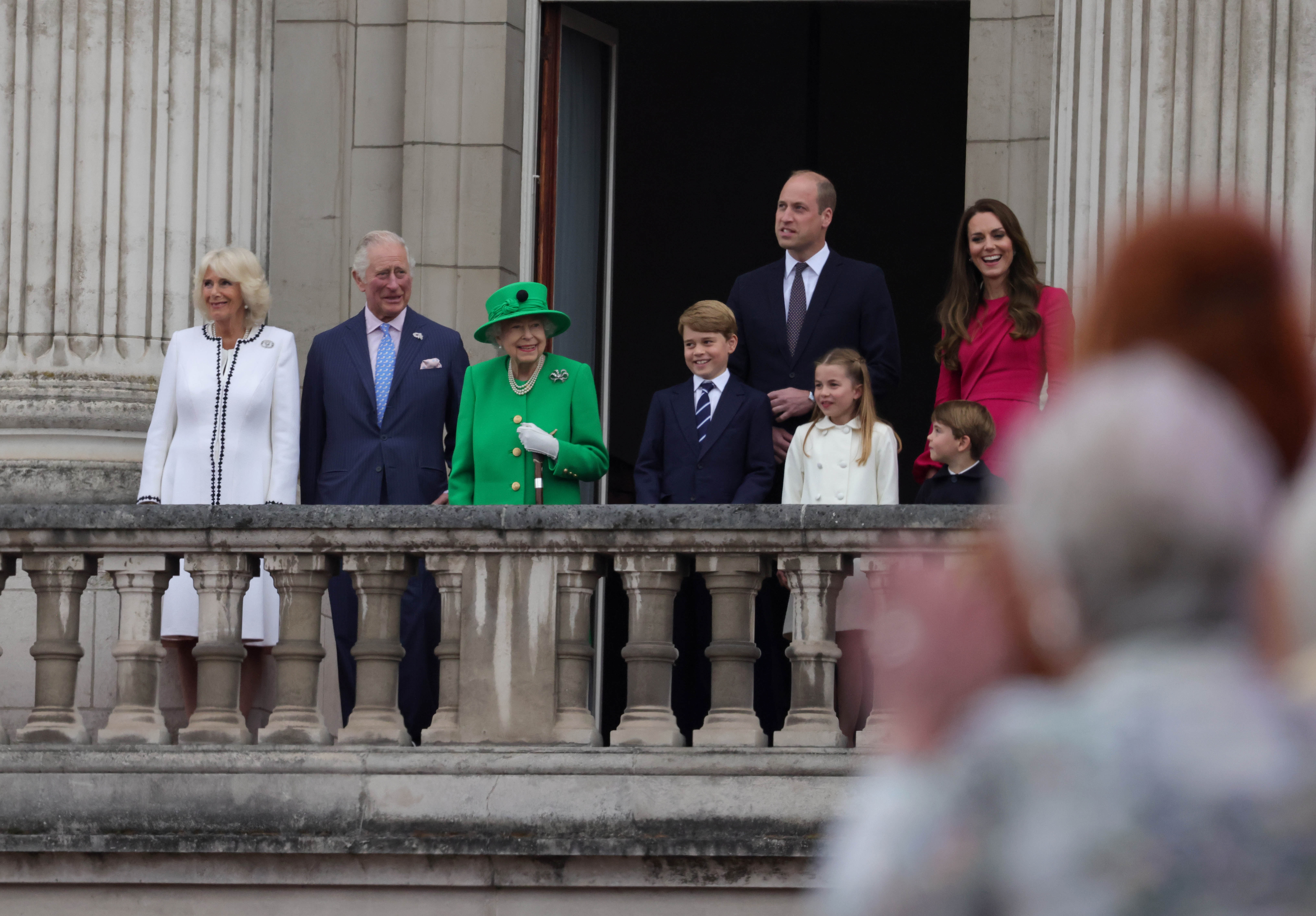
Queen Elizabeth II's final appearance on the balcony during her Platinum Jubilee celebrations in 2022

Between 1847 and 1850, when Blore was building the new east wing, the Brighton Pavilion was once again plundered of its fittings. As a result, many of the rooms in the new wing have a distinctly oriental atmosphere. The red and blue Chinese Luncheon Room is made up of parts of the Brighton Banqueting and Music Rooms with a large oriental chimneypiece designed by Robert Jones and sculpted by Richard Westmacott. It was formerly in the Music Room at the Brighton Pavilion. The ornate clock, known as the Kylin Clock, was made in Jingdezhen, Jiangxi Province, China, in the second half of the 18th century; it has a later movement by Benjamin Vulliamy circa 1820. The Yellow Drawing Room has hand-painted Chinese wallpaper supplied in 1817 for the Brighton Saloon, and a chimneypiece which is a European vision of a Chinese chimneypiece. It has nodding mandarins in niches and fearsome winged dragons, designed by Robert Jones.

At the centre of this wing is the famous balcony with the Centre Room behind its glass doors. This is a Chinese-style saloon enhanced by Queen Mary, who, working with the designer Charles Allom, created a more "binding" Chinese theme in the late 1920s, although the lacquer doors were brought from Brighton in 1873. Running the length of the piano nobile of the east wing is the Great Gallery, modestly known as the Principal Corridor, which runs the length of the eastern side of the quadrangle. It has mirrored doors and mirrored cross walls reflecting porcelain pagodas and other oriental furniture from Brighton. The Chinese Luncheon Room and Yellow Drawing Room are situated at each end of this gallery, with the Centre Room in between.

== Court ceremonies ==
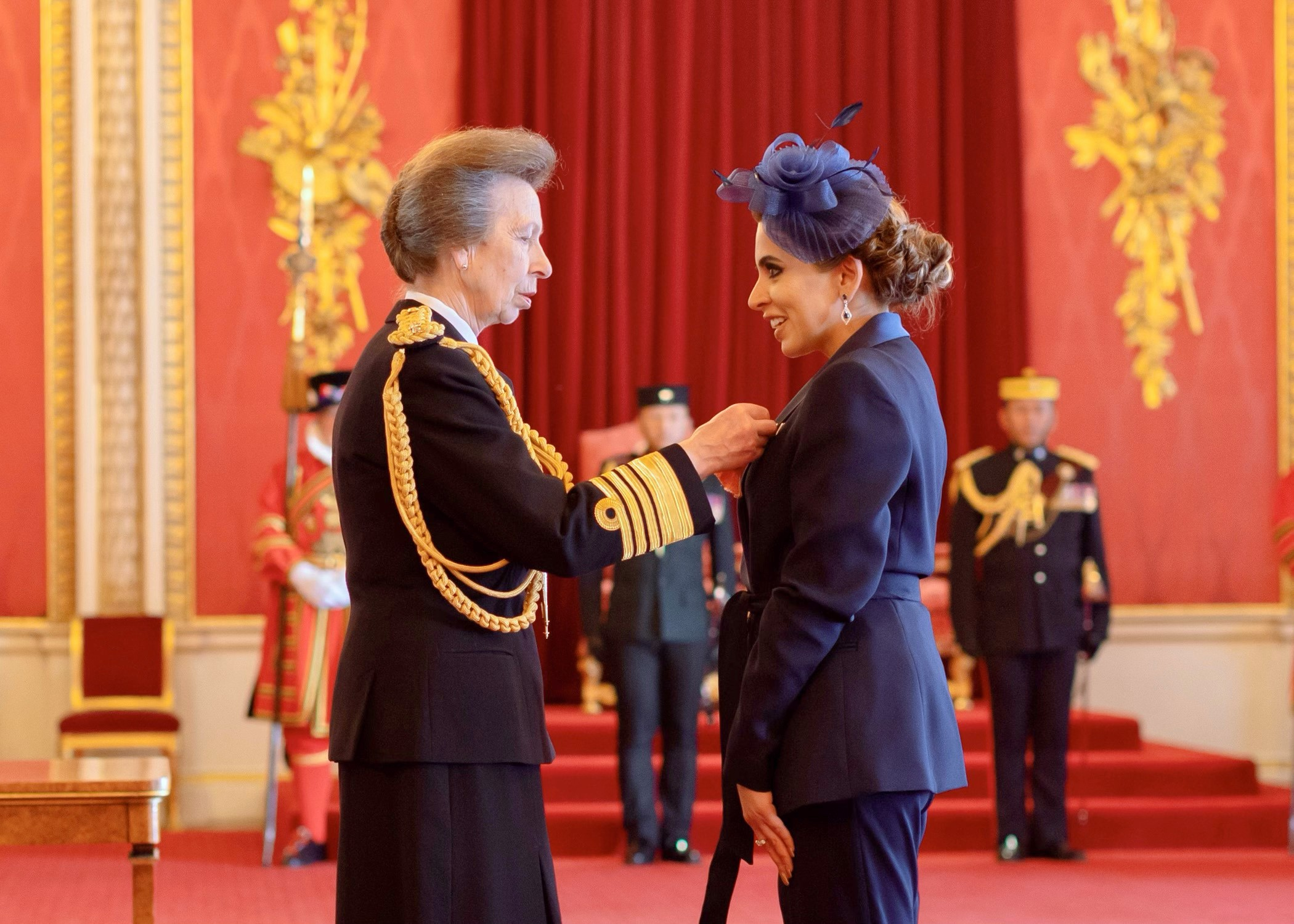
The Princess Royal conducting an investiture in the Throne Room in 2023

Investitures for the awarding of honours (which include the conferring of knighthoods by dubbing with a sword) usually take place in the palace's Throne Room. Investitures are conducted by the King or another senior member of the royal family: a military band plays in the musicians' gallery, as recipients receive their honours, watched by their families and friends.

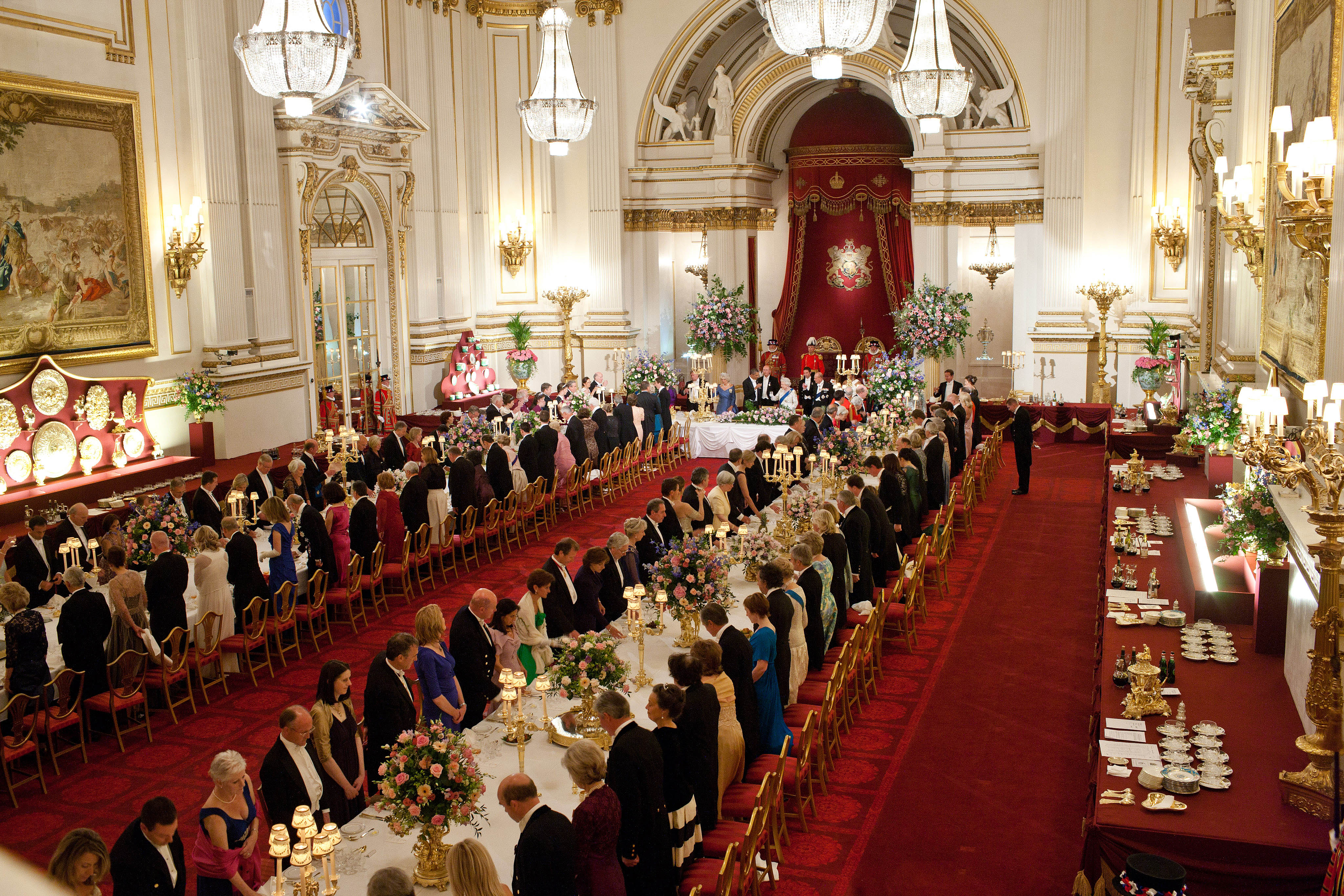
A state banquet held in the Ballroom in 2011, when Queen Elizabeth II hosted President Barack Obama

State banquets take place in the Ballroom, built in 1854. At 120 feet (36.6 m) long, 60 feet (18 m) wide and 45 feet (13.5 m) high, it is the largest room in the palace; at one end of the room is a throne dais (beneath a giant, domed velvet canopy, known as a shamiana or baldachin, that was used at the Delhi Durbar in 1911). State Banquets are formal dinners held on the first evening of a state visit by a foreign head of state. On these occasions, for up to 170 guests in formal "white tie and decorations", including tiaras, the dining table is laid with the Grand Service, a collection of silver-gilt plate made in 1811 for the Prince of Wales, later George IV.

The largest and most formal reception at Buckingham Palace takes place every November when the King entertains members of the diplomatic corps. On this grand occasion, all the state rooms are in use, as the royal family proceed through them, beginning at the great north doors of the Picture Gallery. As Nash had envisaged, all the large, double-mirrored doors stand open, reflecting the numerous crystal chandeliers and sconces, creating a deliberate optical illusion of space and light.

Smaller ceremonies such as the reception of new ambassadors take place in the "1844 Room". Here too, the King holds small lunch parties, and often meetings of the Privy Council. Larger lunch parties often take place in the curved and domed Music Room or the State Dining Room. Since the bombing of the palace chapel in World War II, royal christenings have sometimes taken place in the Music Room. Queen Elizabeth II's first three children were all baptised there. On all formal occasions, the ceremonies are attended by the Yeomen of the Guard, in their historic uniforms, and other officers of the court such as the Lord Chamberlain.

=== Former ceremonial ===
==== Court dress ====
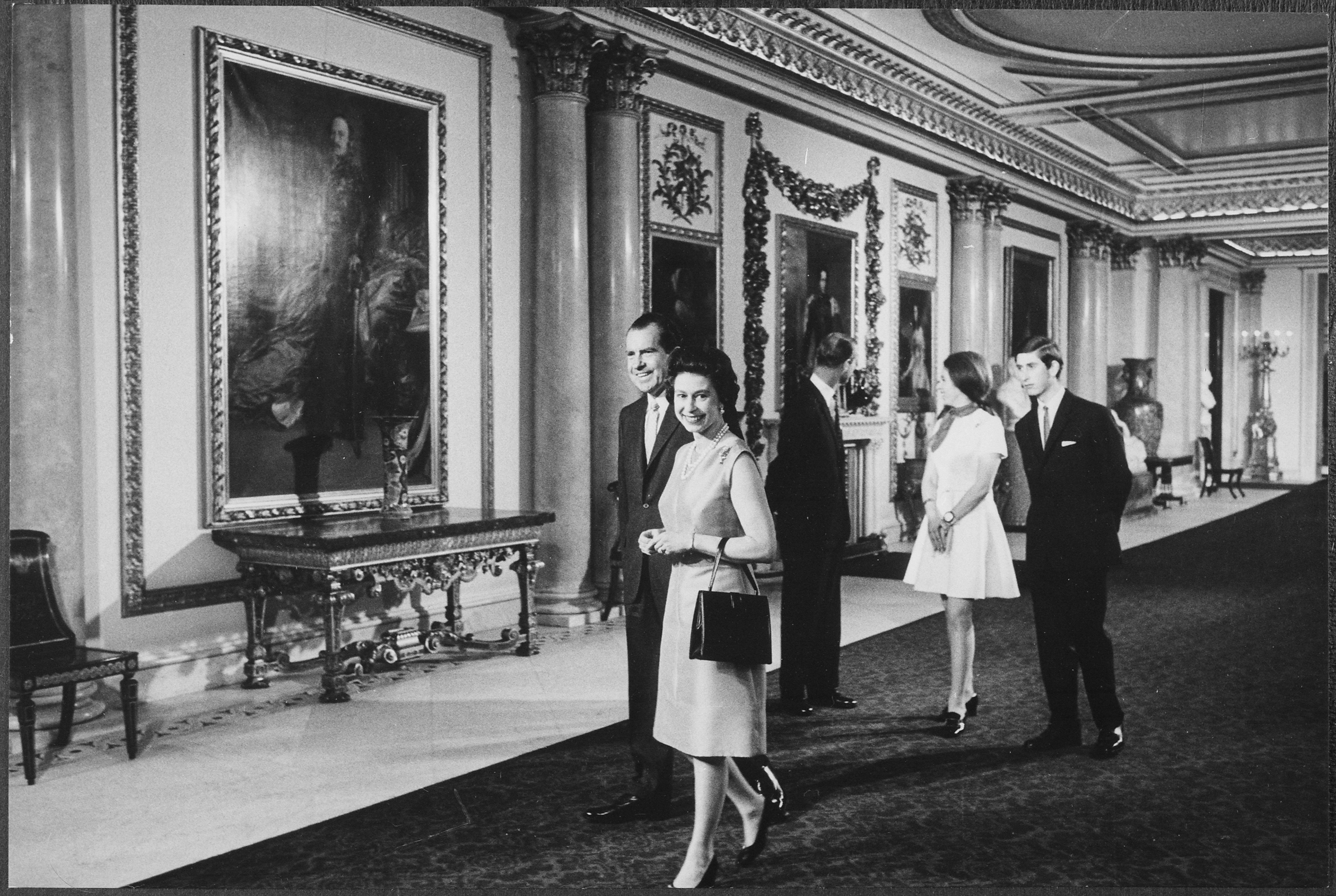
President Nixon with members of the royal family in the ground-floor Marble Hall

Formerly, men not wearing military uniform wore knee breeches of 18th-century design. Women's evening dress included trains and tiaras or feathers in their hair (often both). The dress code governing formal court uniform and dress has progressively relaxed. After the First World War, when Queen Mary wished to follow fashion by raising her skirts a few inches from the ground, she requested a lady-in-waiting to shorten her own skirt first to gauge the King's reaction. King George V disapproved, so the Queen kept her hemline unfashionably low. Following his accession in 1936, King George VI and Queen Elizabeth allowed the hemline of daytime skirts to rise. Today, there is no official dress code. Most men invited to Buckingham Palace in the daytime choose to wear service uniform or lounge suits; a minority wear morning coats, and in the evening, depending on the formality of the occasion, black tie or white tie.

==== Court presentation of débutantes ====
Débutantes were aristocratic young ladies making their first entrée into society through a presentation to the monarch at court. These occasions, known as "coming out", took place at the palace from the reign of Edward VII. The débutantes entered – wearing full court dress, with three ostrich feathers in their hair – curtsied, performed a backwards walk and a further curtsey, while manoeuvring a dress train of prescribed length. The ceremony, known as an evening court, corresponded to the "court drawing rooms" of Victoria's reign. After World War II, the ceremony was replaced by less formal afternoon receptions, omitting the requirement of court evening dress. In 1958, Queen Elizabeth II abolished the presentation parties for débutantes, replacing them with Garden Parties, (Note: Princess Margaret is reputed to have remarked of the débutante presentations: "We had to put a stop to it, every tart in London was getting in.") for up to 8,000 invitees in the Garden. They are the largest functions of the year.

== Garden and surroundings ==
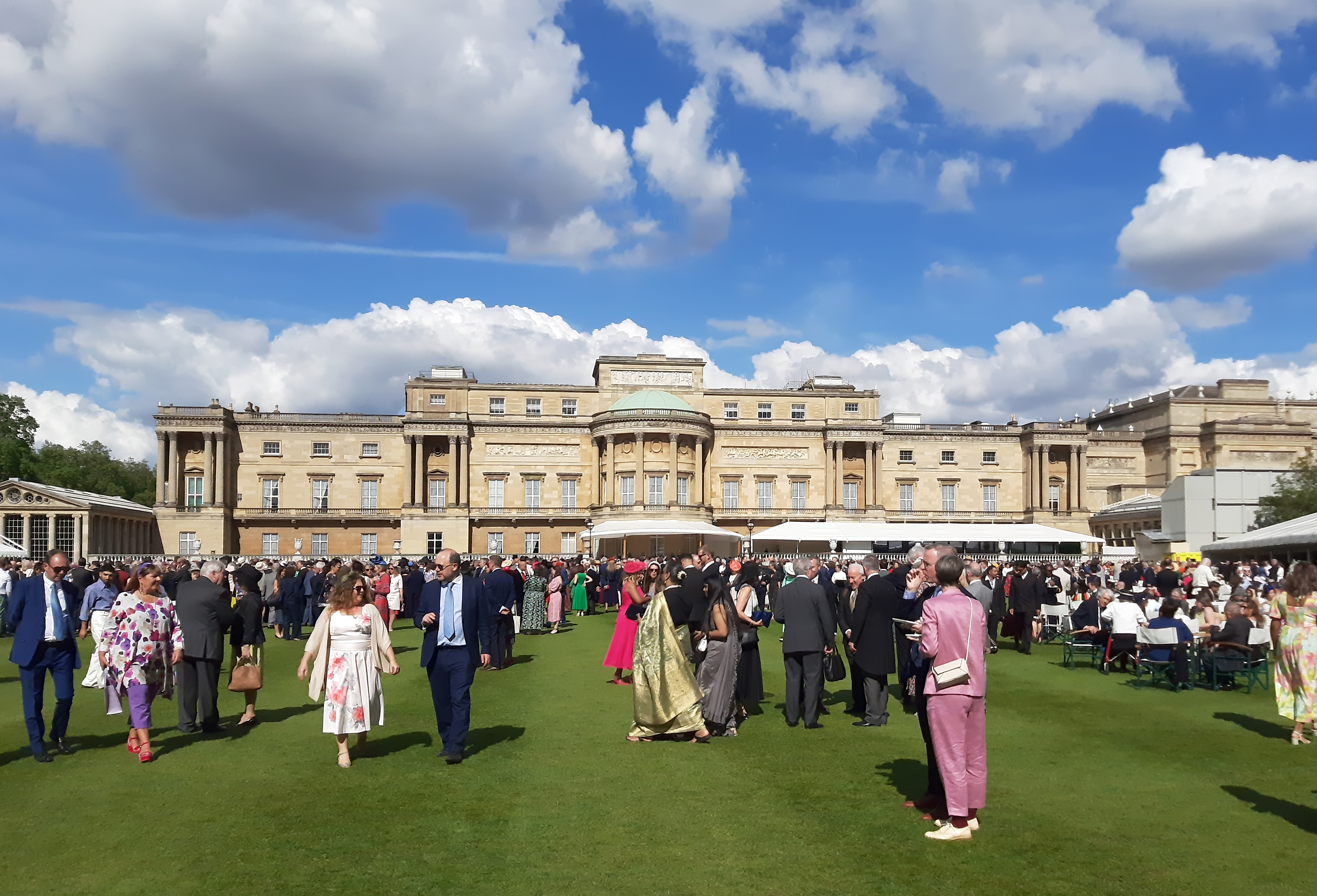
A garden party held outside the west façade of Buckingham Palace in 2024

At the rear of the palace is the large and park-like garden covering 39 acres (16 ha), which is the largest private garden in London. There, monarchs host garden parties each summer and also hold large functions to celebrate royal milestones, such as jubilees. The garden contains more than 1,000 trees, 325 species of wild plants and 20–25 different species of nesting birds. It also includes a helicopter landing area, a lake and a tennis court.

Adjacent to the palace is the Royal Mews, also designed by Nash, where the royal carriages, including the Gold State Coach, are housed. This Rococo styled gilt coach, designed by William Chambers in 1760, has painted panels by Giovanni Battista Cipriani. It was first used for the State Opening of Parliament by George III in 1762 and has been used by the monarch for every coronation since William IV. Also housed in the mews are the coach horses used at royal ceremonial processions as well as many of the cars used by the royal family.

The Mall, a ceremonial approach route to the palace, was designed by Aston Webb and completed in 1911 as part of a grand memorial to Queen Victoria. It extends from Admiralty Arch, across St James's Park to the Victoria Memorial, concluding at the entrance gates into the palace forecourt. This route is used by the cavalcades and motorcades of visiting heads of state, and by the royal family on state occasions – such as the annual Trooping the Colour.

== Security breaches ==
The boy Jones was an intruder who gained entry to the palace on three occasions between 1838 and 1841. At least 12 people have managed to gain unauthorised entry into the palace or its grounds since 1914, including Michael Fagan, who broke into the palace twice in 1982 and entered Queen Elizabeth II's bedroom on the second occasion on 9 July. At the time, news media reported that he had had a long conversation with her while she waited for security officers to arrive. In a 2012 interview with The Independent, Fagan said she ran out of the room, and no conversation took place. It was only in 2007 that trespassing on the palace grounds became a specific criminal offence. (Note: Under section 128(1) of the Serious Organised Crime and Police Act 2005, "A person commits an offence if he enters, or is on, any designated site in England and Wales or Northern Ireland as a trespasser". Buckingham Palace is a designated site under the Serious Organised Crime and Police Act 2005 (Designated Sites under Section 128) Order 2007.)

== See also ==
- Flags at Buckingham Palace
- List of British royal residences
- King's Guard
- Victoria Memorial, London
- Canada Gate
- Australia Gate

== Bibliography ==
- Allison, Ronald; Riddell, Sarah (1991). The Royal Encyclopedia. London: Macmillan. ISBN 978-0-3335-3810-4
- Blaikie, Thomas (2002). You Look Awfully Like the Queen: Wit and Wisdom from the House of Windsor. London: HarperCollins. ISBN 978-0-0073-9622-1.
- Goring, O. G. (1937). From Goring House to Buckingham Palace. London: Ivor Nicholson & Watson.
- Harris, John; de Bellaigue, Geoffrey; & Miller, Oliver (1968). Buckingham Palace. London: Nelson. ISBN 978-0-1714-1011-2.
- Healey, Edma (1997). The Queen's House: A Social History of Buckingham Palace. London: Penguin Group. ISBN 978-0-7181-4089-2.
- Hedley, Olwen (1971) The Pictorial History of Buckingham Palace. Pitkin, ISBN 978-0-8537-2086-7.
- Jones, Nigel R. (30 June 2005). Architecture of England, Scotland, and Wales. Greenwood Publishing Group. ISBN 978-0-3133-1850-4.
- King, Greg (2007). Twilight of Splendor: The Court of Queen Victoria During Her Diamond Jubilee Year. John Wiley & Sons. ISBN 978-0-4700-4439-1.
- Mackenzie, Compton (1953). The Queen's House. London: Hutchinson.
- Nash, Roy (1980). Buckingham Palace: The Place and the People. London: Macdonald Futura. ISBN 978-0-3540-4529-2..
- Peacocke, M. D. (1951). The Story of Buckingham Palace. London: Odhams Press.
- Rappaport, Helen (2003). Queen Victoria: A Biographical Companion. ABC-CLIO. ISBN 978-1-8510-9355-7.
- Robinson, John Martin (1999). Buckingham Palace: Official Guide. St James's Palace, London: The Royal Collection. ISBN 978-1-9021-6336-9.
- Williams, Neville (1971). Royal Homes of Great Britain from Medieval to Modern Times. London: Lutterworth Press. ISBN 978-0-7188-0803-7..
- Woodham-Smith, Cecil (1975). Queen Victoria: Her Life and Times 1819-1861. Vol. 1. London: Sphere Books. ISBN 978-0-3511-8738-4.
- Wright, Patricia (1999) [1996]. The Strange History of Buckingham Palace. Trowbridge: Wren's Park. ISBN 978-0-9057-7837-2.
