= Justin Mortimer =

English painter

Justin Mortimer (born 1970) is an English painter, recognized for his paintings of well known high society including Harold Pinter, Sir Steve Redgrave and Queen Elizabeth II. He won the National Gallery's BP Portrait Award in 1991.

== Early life and education ==
Mortimer was born in 1970 in Cosford, Shropshire, England. His family lived in Somerset and Cornwall and Mortimer went to Wells Cathedral School. He studied at the Slade School of Art from 1988 to 1992.

== Career and works ==
Mortimer came to public attention when he won the National Portrait Gallery's BP Portrait Award in 1991. He subsequently was given a number of important commissions, to paint well-known public figures including Harold Pinter, Queen Elizabeth II, David Bowie and Sir Steve Redgrave.

Mortimer painted Queen Elizabeth II in 1998. The commission marked her 50 years as President of the Royal Society of Arts. Prue Leith, who arranged the commission, recalls the painting was controversial because it showed the Queen's head separated from her body.

Mortimer's recent paintings take on difficult subjects, including war, barbarism and death.
