= Robert Jones (designer) =

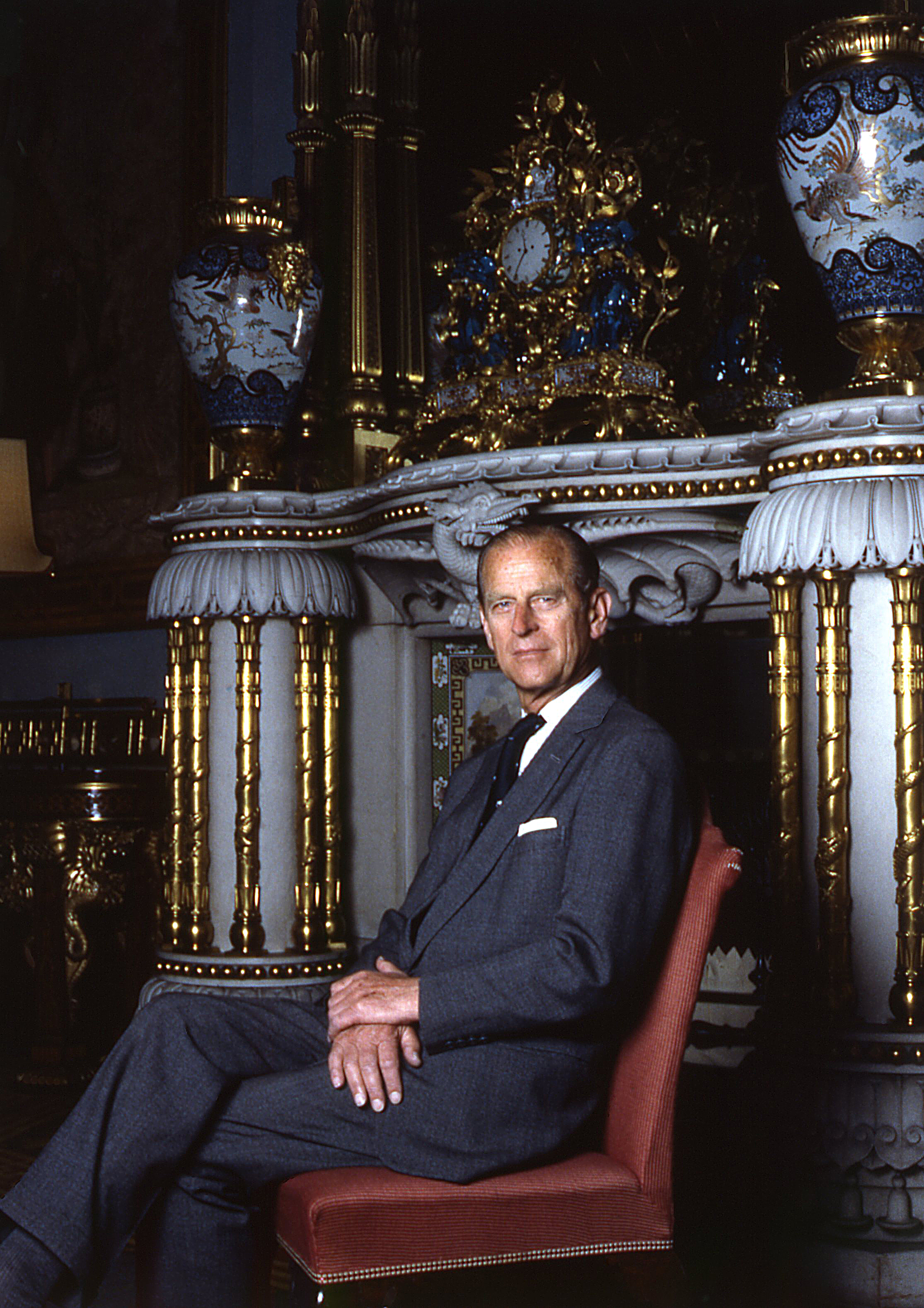
The Duke of Edinburgh seated in the Chinese Luncheon Room at Buckingham Palace. The chimneypiece was designed by Robert Jones and sculpted by Richard Westmacott. It was formerly in the Music Room at the Brighton Pavilion.

Robert Jones was a British designer active between 1815 and 1833. His work include chimney pieces for the Royal Pavilion at Brighton, later moved to Buckingham Palace, and various items connected with grand interior design, such a throne dais for Queen Charlotte. and ornate furniture in the Chinese style, which was fashionable the end of the 18th century.
