= John Hayes (art historian) =

British art historian and museum director

John Hayes

John Trevor Hayes CBE FRSA (21 January 1929 – 25 December 2005) was a British art historian and museum director. He was an authority on the paintings of Thomas Gainsborough.

== Early life ==
Hayes was educated at Ardingly College and read modern history at Keble College, Oxford after which he undertook a postgraduate diploma at The Courtauld Institute of Art.

== Career ==
In 1954, he became assistant keeper of the London Museum in Kensington Palace, the forerunner to the modern Museum of London. He developed an interest in Gainsborough after realising that British artists had hitherto been neglected by art-historical scholarship. Taking advantage of a Commonwealth Fund fellowship, he travelled to the United States and spent a year as a Research Scholar at the New York University Institute of Fine Arts from 1958 to 1959. After his return, he curated a Gainsborough exhibition for the Arts Council and in 1962 he received his PhD for research into Gainsborough's landscape paintings. He was visiting professor of fine arts at Yale University from 1960 to 1970.

From 1970 to 1974, Hayes was director of the London Museum, overseeing its move to new premises on London Wall. In 1974, he was subsequently appointed director of the National Portrait Gallery, succeeding Sir Roy Strong in the post. The duties that came with the NPG directorship did not curtail Hayes's scholarly activities, however, and during his tenure he managed to curate a major Gainsborough exhibition at the Tate and the Grand Palais, Paris), and numerous smaller ones, including one of Graham Sutherland's work. Under his aegis, the NPG's annual portrait award (now the BP Portrait Award) was established in 1980, and two regional outposts for the gallery opened at Beningbrough Hall in Yorkshire and Bodelwyddan Castle in Denbighshire. Plans to move the institution to larger premises in London were never realised, although a new block for staff was built across the road from the Gallery's Victorian building.

== Later years ==
After his retirement in 1994, Hayes continued in his scholarly work, curating a further Gainsborough exhibition in Ferrara and serving as vice-president of the Walpole Society.

== Archive ==
The John Hayes Archive is held at the Paul Mellon Centre and available for public consultation. It includes research notes surrounding Hayes' publications and proposed publications on Thomas Gainsborough, Joshua Reynolds, Thomas Rowlandson, and Graham Sutherland. The material on Sutherland includes letters written between Hayes and the artist. The archive consist largely of correspondence, notes, photographs, journal offprints and drafts of publications.

== Selected publications ==
- Thomas Gainsborough. Tate Gallery, London, 1980. ISBN 0905005724
- The Letters of Thomas Gainsborough, Paul Mellon Centre by Yale University Press, 2001.
- Gainsborough and Rowlandson: a New York private collection, Private Publication, New York, 1998.
- Thomas Gainsborough, Ferrara Arte, 1998.
- London in paint: oil paintings in the collection at the Museum of London, Museum of London, 1996.
- British paintings of the sixteenth through nineteenth centuries, Cambridge University Press, 1993.
- The Art of Thomas Rowlandson, Arts Services International, 1990.
- The Landscape Paintings of Thomas Gainsborough; a critical text and catalogue raisonné, Philip Wilson for Sotheby Publications, 1983.
- The art of Graham Sutherland, Phaidon, 1980.
- Portraits by Graham Sutherland, National Portrait Gallery, 1977.
- Gainsborough: paintings and drawings, Phaidon, 1975.
- Richard Wilson, Purnell & Sons, 1966.
