= Household of George VI and Elizabeth =

Departments of the British royal family

The households of King George VI and Queen Elizabeth (known, after the death of her husband, as Queen Elizabeth the Queen Mother) were made up of office-holders and staff supporting their work.

The future George VI (1895–1952) was the second son of George V. He was created Duke of York in 1920 and married Lady Elizabeth Bowes-Lyon (1900–2002) in 1923. The Duke succeeded to the throne following the abdication of his brother King Edward VIII (whose reign had lasted just under a year). As King, George VI inherited his a sovereign's Household from his brother; when the new Household was announced in March 1937, many of the office-holders were the same as had been appointed to the Household of Edward VIII seven months earlier.

As Queen, Elizabeth maintained her own Household (as was then traditional for a consort). Her Household was announced in 1937, initially consisting of a Mistress of the Robes, four Ladies of the Bedchamber, four Women of the Bedchamber (plus one 'extra'), her own Lord Chamberlain and a Treasurer. After the death of her husband in 1952, her Household was known as the Household of Queen Elizabeth the Queen Mother.

== Household of the Duke of York (1920–1923) and of the Duke and Duchess of York (1923–1936) ==
=== Comptroller ===
- 1920–1924: Wing Cdr Louis Greig
- 1924–1936: Capt. Basil Vernon Brooke (Comptroller and Equerry)

=== Deputy Comptroller ===
- 1936: Cdr Harold Campbell (Deputy Comptroller and Equerry)

=== Private Secretary ===
- 1921–: Lt Col. Ronald Waterhouse (Private Secretary and Equerry)
- 1926–1933: Patrick Kirkman Hodgson, Esq.
- 1933–1936: Cdr Harold Campbell (Private Secretary and Equerry)
- 1936: Sir Eric Charles Miéville

=== Assistant Private Secretary ===
- 1930–1933: Cdr Harold Campbell (Assistant Private Secretary and Equerry)

=== Equerry ===
- 1923–1927:Lt Colin Buist
- 1929–1930: Cdr Harold Campbell (Acting Equerry)
- 1934–1936: Lt the Hon. T. W. E. Coke

=== Extra Equerry ===
- 1927–1936: Maj. T. E. G. Nugent

=== Ladies-in-Waiting ===
- 1923–1926: Lady Katharine Meade
- 1926–1932: Lady Helen Graham
- 1932–1936: The Hon. Mrs Geoffrey Bowlby

=== Extra Ladies-in-Waiting ===
- 1929–1936: The Lady Annaly

==== Physicians ====
- 1936: George Frederick Still
- 1936: Sir John Weir
- 1936: Henry Letheby Tidy
- 1936: Daniel Thomas Davies

==== Surgeons ====
- 1936: Sir Lancelot Barrington-Ward
- 1936: Arthur Porritt

== Household of King George VI (1936–1952) ==
=== Lord Chamberlain ===
- 1937–1938: The Rt Hon. Rowland Thomas, Earl of Cromer
- 1938–1952: The Rt Hon. George Herbert Hyde, Earl of Clarendon

=== Lord Steward ===
- 1937–1940: The Rt Hon. Walter John, Duke of Buccleuch and Queensberry
- 1940–1952: Wing Cdr Douglas, Duke of Hamilton and Brandon

=== Master of the Horse ===
- 1937–1952: The Most Noble Henry Hugh Arthur Fitzroy, Duke of Beaufort

=== Private Secretary ===
- 1936–1943: The Rt Hon. Sir Alexander Henry Louis Hardinge
- 1943–1952: Sir Alan Lascelles

==== Assistant Private Secretaries ====
- 1937: Frank Herbert Mitchell, Esq.
- 1937–1943: Alan Frederick Lascelles, Esq.
- 1937–: Sir Eric Charles Miéville
- 1937–: Michael Adeane, Esq.

=== The King's Archives ===
==== Keeper ====
- 1937–1945: Col. the Rt Hon. Clive, Baron Wigram
- 1945–1952: The Rt Hon. Sir Alan Frederick Lascelles

===== Assistant Keeper =====
- 1937–1952: Owen Frederick Morshead, Esq.

=== Keeper of the Privy Purse ===
- 1937–1952: Sir Ulick Alexander

==== Financial Secretary to the King ====
- 1937–: Frederick Percival Robinson, Esq.

=== The Almonry ===
==== High Almoner ====
- 1937–1946: The Most Reverend and Right Hon. Cosmo Gordon Lang (Archbishop of Canterbury)
- 1946–1952: The Right Reverend Edward Sydney Woods, Bishop of Lichfield

===== Sub-Almoner =====
- 1937–1941: Prebendary Launcelot Jefferson Percival
- 1941–1948: The Rev. Wallace Harold Elliott
- 1948–1952: The Rev. Maurice Frederic Foxell

=== Lords in Waiting ===
Two 'non-political' Lords in Waiting (the Earl of Eldon and Viscount Allendale) were appointed by the king, otherwise these were political appointees.

- 1937–1939: Henry Rainald, Viscount Gage
- 1937–1938: Geoffrey William Richard Hugh, Earl of Munster
- 1937: Basil Sheridan, Marquess of Dufferin and Ava
- 1937–1939: John Henry George, Earl of Erne
- 1937–1952: John, Earl of Eldon
- 1937–1952: Wentworth Henry Canning, Viscount Allendale
- 1937–1945: Col. Hugh William, Earl Fortescue
- 1938–1940, 1951-1952: Frederick Winston Furneaux, Earl of Birkenhead
- 1939–1940: Rowland Arthur Herbert Nelson, Viscount Bridport
- 1939–1940: Robert Egerton, Baron Ebury
- 1940–1945: Francis Gerald, Viscount Clifden
- 1940–1945: The Rt Hon. Robert, Baron Alness
- 1945: The Most Hon. Oswald Constantine John, Marquess of Normanby
- 1945: The Most Noble Hugh Algernon, Duke of Northumberland
- 1945–1947: The Rt Hon. William, Baron Westwood
- 1945–1946: The Rt Hon. Francis Aungier, Baron Pakenham
- 1945–1948: The Rt Hon. William Watson, Baron Henderson
- 1946–1950: The Rt Hon. Robert Samuel Theodore, Baron Chorley
- 1947–1948: The Rt Hon. Robert Craigmyle, Baron Morrison
- 1948–1949: The Rt Hon. George William, Baron Lucas of Chilworth
- 1948–1949: The Rt Hon. George Robert, Baron Shepherd
- 1949–1951: The Rt Hon. Fred, Baron Kershaw
- 1949–1950: The Rt Hon. John Percival, Baron Darwen
- 1950–1951: The Rt Hon. Thomas William, Baron Burden
- 1951–1952: The Rt Hon. Leslie, Baron Haden-Guest
- 1951–1952: The Rt Hon. George Nigel, Earl of Selkirk
- 1951–1952: The Rt Hon. Alexander David Frederick, Baron Lloyd

==== Permanent Lords in Waiting ====
- 1936–1952: Col. the Rt Hon. Clive, Baron Wigram
- 1938–1952: the Rt Hon. Rowland Thomas, Earl of Cromer

=== His Majesty's Comptroller at Ascot ===
- 1937–1945: The Rt Hon. Bernard Arthur William Patrick Hastings, Earl of Granard

=== Master of the Household ===
- 1937–1941: Brig. Gen. Sir Smith Hill Child, Bt.
- 1941–1952: Lt Col. Sir Piers Walter Legh

==== Assistant Master of the Household ====
- 1937–: Capt. Ririd Myddelton

==== Deputy Master of the Household ====
- 1950–1952: Gp Capt. Peter Wooldridge Townsend

=== Comptroller, Lord Chamberlain's Office ===
- 1937–1952: Maj. Terence Edmund Gascoigne Nugent

==== Assistant Comptroller, Lord Chamberlain's Office ====
- 1937–: Maj. Norman Wilmshurst Gwatkin

==== Examiners of Plays ====
- 1937–: Henry Clement Game, Esq.
- 1937–: Geoffrey Dearmer, Esq.

==== Secretary of the Central Chancery of the Orders of Knighthood ====
- 1937–: Maj. Henry Hudson Fraser Stockley

=== Marshal of the Diplomatic Corps ===
- 1937–1945: Lt-Gen. Sir George Sidney Clive
- 1945–1950: Sir John Berkeley Monck
- 1950–1952: Maj.-Gen. Arthur Guy Salisbury-Jones

==== Vice Marshal ====
- 1937–1945: John Berkeley Monck, Esq.

==== Assistant Marshal ====
- 1937–1952: Capt. Sir John Lindsay Dashwood, Bt.

=== Crown Equerry ===
- 1937–1941: Col. Sir Arthur Erskine
- 1941–1952: Col. Dermot McMorrough Kavanagh

=== Equerries ===
- 1937–1946: Lt Col. the Hon. Piers Walter Legh
- 1937–1946: Wing Cdr Edward Hedley Fielden (Captain of the King's Flight)
- 1937–1939: Cdr Charles Lambe
- 1937–1941: Lt Col. Dermot McMorrough Kavanagh
- 1937–1952: Lt Michael Adeane
- 1937–1952: Cdr Harold Campbell
- 1939–1946: Cdr Edward Michael Conolly Abel-Smith
- 1943–1944: Wing Cdr James Ernest Pelly-Fry (temporary)
- 1943–1946: Cdr John William Grant (temporary)
- 1944–1952: Wg-Cdr Peter Wooldridge Townsend (temporary)
- 1946–1948: Lt Peter William Beckwith Ashmore (temporary)
- 1948–1950: Lt-Cdr George Gosselin Marten (temporary)
- 1948–1952: Capt. the Rt Hon. Patrick Terence William Span, Baron Plunket (temporary)
- 1950–1952: Capt. Edward John, Viscount Althorp (temporary)

==== Extra Equerries ====
- 1937–1952: Maj. James Ulick Francis Canning Alexander
- 1937–1952: Adm. the Hon. Sir Hubert George Brand
- 1937–1952: Adm. Sir Henry Tritton Buller
- 1937–1952: Brig.-Gen. Sir Smith Hill Child
- 1937–1952: Col. the Hon. Sir George Arthur Charles Crichton
- 1937–1952: The Rt Hon. Rowland Thomas, Earl of Cromer
- 1937–1942: Capt. the Hon. Sir Seymour John Fortescue
- 1937: Maj.-Gen. Lord Edward Gleichen
- 1937–1945: Capt. Sir Bryan Godfrey Godfrey Faussett
- 1937–1940: Major Colin Lindsay Gordon
- 1937–1952: Capt. Walter Douglas Campbell Greenacre
- 1937–1949: Adm. Sir Lionel Halsey
- 1937–1946: Maj.-Gen. Sir John Hanbury Williams
- 1937–1952: Maj. the Rt Hon. Alexander Henry Louis Hardinge
- 1937–1947: Adm. Sir Colin Richard Keppel
- 1937–1944: The Hon. Sir Derek William George Keppel
- 1937–1952: Adm. the Hon. Sir Herbert Meade Fetherstonhaugh
- 1937–1952: Maj. Douglas William Alexander Dalziel Mackenzie
- 1937–1938: Adm. Sir Archibald Berkeley Milne, Bart.
- 1937–1952: Capt. Charles Joseph Henry O'Hara Moore
- 1937–1952: Vice-Adm. Dudley Burton Napier North
- 1937–1952: Lt.-Col. Terence Edmund Gascoigne Nugent
- 1937–1950: Brig.-Gen. George Camborne Beauclerk Paynter
- 1937–1942: Maj. Sir Edward Seymour
- 1937–1938: Col. Sir Henry Streatfeild
- 1937–1938: Maj. the Hon. Sir John Hubert Ward
- 1937–1945: Maj.-Gen. Sir Harry Davis Watson
- 1937–1952: Col. the Rt Hon. Clive, Baron Wigram
- 1937–1952: Maj. Sir John Renton Aird, Bt.
- 1937–1952: Lt the Hon. Thomas William Coke (later Earl of Leicester)
- 1937–1952: Capt. Richard John Streatfeild
- 1937–1952: Lt Cdr Colin Buist
- 1939–1952: Capt. Charles Edward Lambe
- 1939–1952: Sir George Arthur Ponsonby
- 1940–1952: Capt. Arthur Horace Penn
- 1941–1952: Col. Sir Arthur Edward Erskine
- 1945–1952: Lt-Gen. Sir George Sidney Clive
- 1946–1952: Lt-Col. the Hon. Sir Piers Walter Legh
- 1946–1952: Air Commodore Edward Hedley Fielden (Captain of The King's Flight)
- 1946–1952: Captain Edward Michael Conolly Abel Smith
- 1948–1952: Lt-Cdr Peter William Beckwith Ashmore
- 1950–1952: Brig. Norman Wilmshurst Gwatkin

=== Honorary Veterinary Surgeons ===
- 1937–1939: Maj. Sir Frederick Hobday
- 1937–: John Willett, Esq.

=== Grooms in Waiting ===
- 1937–1945: R Adm. Sir Basil Vernon Brooke
- 1937: Cdr Harold George Campbell
- 1937–1952: Arthur Horace Penn, Esq.
- 1937–1942: Col. the Hon. Sir George Sidney Herbert, Bt.
- 1937–1952: Capt. Richard John Streatfeild
- 1937–1950: Brig.-Gen. George Camborne Beauclerk Paynter

==== Extra Grooms in Waiting ====
- 1937–1952: The Hon Sir Montague Charles Eliot (later Earl of St Germans)
- 1937–1950: Sir Harry Lloyd-Verney
- 1937–1939: The Hon. Sir Harry Julian Stonor
- 1937–1947: Maj. Sir Philip Hunloke
- 1937–1944: Col. Sir Victor Audley Falconer Mackenzie, Bt.
- 1937–1952: Sir Frank Herbert Mitchell

==== Groom of the Robes ====
- 1937–1952: Cdr Harold George Campbell

=== Gentlemen Ushers ===
- 1937–1946: Capt. Charles Alexander Lindsay Irvine
- 1937–1950: Col. Edmund Vivian Gabriel
- 1937–1952: Capt. Humphrey Clifford LLoyd
- 1937–1952: Lt-Col. Henry Valentine Bache de Satgé
- 1937–1952: Rear-Adm. Arthur Bromley
- 1937–1942: Col. the Hon. Sir George Sidney Herbert, Bt.
- 1937–1946: John Hanbury-Williams, Esq.
- 1937–1939: Maj. John Lamplugh Wickham
- 1937–1952: Lt-Col. Frederick Edward Packe
- 1937–: Cdr Russell Lister-Kaye
- 1937–1951: Capt. Neville Charsley Tufnell
- 1937–1952: Col. Geoffrey Ronald Codrington
- 1937–1952: Capt. William Duncan Phipps
- 1937–1952: Paymaster Capt. Sir Frank Todd Spickernell, R.N.
- 1937–1952: Capt. Philip Lloyd Neville, R.N.
- 1937–1938: Maj. the Hon. John Spencer Coke
- 1938–1952: Col. Guy Elland Carne Rasch
- 1952: Air Vice-Marshal Sir George Ranald Macfarlane Reid

==== Extra Gentlemen Ushers ====
- 1937–1952: Maj. Gerald Montagu Augustus Ellis
- 1937–1943: Col. Lord William Cecil
- 1937–1943: Brig.-Gen. Montagu Grant Wilkinson
- 1937–1941: Maj. Berkeley John Talbot Levett
- 1937: Paymaster-Rear-Adm. Sir Hamnet Holditch Share
- 1937: Adm. Philip Nelson-Ward
- 1937–1952: Lt-Col. Sir Arthur D'Arcy Gordon Bannerman, Bt.
- 1937–1952: Wing Cdr Sir Louis Greig
- 1938–1952: Maj. the Hon. John Spencer Coke
- 1939–1952: Maj. John Lamplugh Wickham
- 1946–1952: Capt. Charles Alexander Lindsay Irvine
- 1946–1952: John Coldbrook Hanbury-Williams, Esq.
- 1950–1952: Sir John Berkeley Monck
- 1950–1952: Sir Algar Henry Stafford Howard
- 1951–1952: Capt. Andrew Vavasour Scott Yates, R.N.
- 1951–1952: Maj. Thomas Cockayne Harvey
- 1952: Lt-Col. Frederick Edward Packe

==== Gentleman Usher to the Sword of State ====
- 1937–1946: Gen. Sir Lewis Stratford Tollemache Halliday
- 1946–1952: Air Chief Marshal Sir Arthur Sheridan Barratt

==== Gentleman Usher of the Black Rod ====
- 1937–1941: Lt-Gen. Sir William Pulteney
- 1941–1944: Air Chief Marshal Sir William Gore Sutherland Mitchell
- 1945–1949: Vice Adm. Sir Geoffrey Blake
- 1949–1952: Lt-Gen. Sir Brian Horrocks

=== Sergeants at Arms ===
- 1937–1948: Capt. Sir Ernest Beachcroft Beckwith Towse
- 1937–1939: Frederic Stanley Osgood, Esq.
- 1937–1946: Maj. Henry Hudson Fraser Stockley
- 1937–1949: George David Field, Esq.
- 1939–1946: Alfred Vigor Marten, Esq.
- 1946–1952: George Alfred Titman, Esq.
- 1946–1952: Lt (S) Albert William Stone, R.N.
- 1949–1952: George Frederick Thomas Hopkins, Esq.

==== Sergeant at Arms, House of Lords ====
- 1937–1939: Maj. Gen. Sir Charles Edward Corkran
- 1939–1946: Adm. the Hon. Sir Herbert Meade-Fetherstonhaugh
- 1946–1952: Air Vice-Marshal Sir Paul Copeland Maltby

==== Sergeant at Arms, House of Commons ====
- 1937–1952: Brig. Charles Alfred Howard

=== Constable and Governor of Windsor Castle ===
- 1937–1952: Maj.-Gen. the Rt Hon. Alexander Augustus Frederick William Alfred George, Earl of Athlone

==== Deputy Constable and Lieutenant Governor ====
- 1937–1945: Col. the Rt Hon. Clive, Baron Wigram
- 1945–1952: Brig. Gen. the Rt Hon. Alexander Gore Arkwright, Earl of Gowrie

==== Librarian ====
- 1937–1952: Owen Frederick Morshead, Esq.

=== Keeper of the Jewel House, Tower of London ===
- 1937–1944: Maj.-Gen. Sir George John Younghusband

Vacant 1944-1952

- 1952: Maj.-Gen. Hervey Degge Wilmot Sitwell

=== Surveyor of The King's Pictures ===
- 1937–1945: Kenneth McKenzie Clark, Esq.
- 1945–1952: Anthony Frederick Blunt, Esq.

=== Surveyor of The King's Works of Art ===
- 1937–1946: Lord Gerald Wellesley (later Duke of Wellington)
- 1946–1952: James Gow Mann, Esq.

=== Master of the Music ===
- 1937–1941: Sir Henry Walford Davies
- 1942–1952: Sir Arnold Edward Trevor Bax

=== Poet Laureate ===
- 1937–1952: John Masefield, Esq.

=== Coroner of the Household ===
- 1937–1952: Lt-Col. William Hilgrove Leslie McCarthy

=== Ecclesiastical Household ===
==== College of Chaplains ====
===== Clerk of the Closet =====
- 1937: The Rt Rev. Thomas Banks Strong, Bishop of Oxford
- 1937–1942: The Rt Rev. Cyril Forster Garbett, Bishop of Winchester
- 1942–1952: The Rt Rev. Percy Mark Herbert, Bishop of Norwich

====== Deputy Clerk of the Closet ======
- 1937–1941: Prebendary Launcelot Jefferson Percival
- 1941–1948: The Rev. Wallace Harold Elliott
- 1948–1952: The Rev. Maurice Frederic Foxell

===== Chaplains =====
- 1937–1945: Prebendary John Henry Joshua Ellison
- 1937–1939: The Rev. Sir Francis Arthur Stanley ffolkes, Bt.
- 1937–1944: The Rev. Hugh Singleton Wood
- 1937–1951: Canon Peter Green
- 1937: The Rev. Samuel Bickersteth
- 1937–1940: Canon Alan England Brooke
- 1937–1952: Canon Travers Guy Rogers
- 1937–1952: The Rev. Frederick Ingall Anderson
- 1937–1946: Canon Bertram Keir Cunningham
- 1937–1946: The Rev. Edward Keble Talbot
- 1937–1941: The Rev. Edward Mewburn Walker
- 1937–1952: Canon Charles Earle Raven
- 1937–1939: The Very Rev. Thomas Heywood Masters, Provost of Portsmouth.
- 1937–1946: The Rev. Charles John Shebbeare
- 1937–1952: The Very Rev. Alfred Charles Eustace Jarvis, Provost of Sheffield.
- 1937–1941: The Rev. Clarence Haselwood Hamilton
- 1937–1952: Canon Arthur Rowland Harry Grant
- 1937–1944, 1948–1952: The Rev. Wallace Harold Elliott
- 1937–1939: The Rev. Frederic Athelwold Iremonger
- 1937–1941: The Rev. William Patrick Glyn McCormick
- 1937–1952: Canon Frederick Homes Dudden
- 1937–1941: Canon Frank Russell Barry
- 1937–1949: The Very Rev. Frederick Brodie Macnutt, Provost of Leicester.
- 1937–1938: The Rev. Harold Costley-White
- 1937–1952: Canon William John Telia Phythian Phythian-Adams
- 1937–1938: Canon John Charles Halland How
- 1937–1945: Canon Oliver Chase Quick
- 1937–1948: Canon Anthony Charles Deane
- 1937–1946: The Rev. Alan Campbell Don
- 1937–1941: The Ven. Archdeacon Richard Brook
- 1937: Canon Hugh Richard Lawrie Sheppard
- 1937–1940: The Rev. Ernest Hayford Thorold
- 1937–1939: The Ven. Archdeacon Leslie Stannard Hunter
- 1937–1940: The Rev. Robert Milner Gibson
- 1937–1952: The Rev. Philip Thomas Byard Clayton
- 1937–1952: Canon Leonard Martin Andrews
- 1937–1946: The Rev. Frederick Arthur Cockin
- 1937–1939: The Rev. Harold Evelyn Hubbard
- 1938–1952: Canon Henry Spencer Stephenson
- 1938–1945: Canon Albert Darell Tupper Carey
- 1939–1944: Prebendary William Wilson Cash
- 1939–1944: Canon Arthur Lindsay Leeper
- 1939–1952: Canon Frank Hay Gillingham
- 1939–1951: The Ven. Cyril Frederick Twitchett
- 1939–1943: Canon Henry Charles Robins
- 1940–1943: The Ven. Thomas Crick
- 1940–1952: The Reverend Thomas Malcolm Layng
- 1940–1952: Canon Henry Edward FitzHerbert
- 1941–1952: Canon Sidney Ernest Swann
- 1941–1952: The Rev. Reginald French
- 1941–1952: Canon Ellis Foster Edge Partington
- 1941–1952: Canon Frederick Boreham
- 1941–1946: The Rev. Clifford Arthur Martin
- 1944–1947: Canon Thomas Bloomer
- 1944–1952: Canon John McLeod Campbell
- 1944–1948: The Ven. Robert William Stannard
- 1944–1948: Prebendary James William Welch
- 1944–1949: Canon Arthur Stafford Crawley
- 1944–1952: The Rev. Albert Victor Baillie
- 1945–1951: Canon Frederick Llewelyn Hughes
- 1945–1948: The Rev. Eric Stephen Loveday
- 1945–1952: The Rev. Arthur Stretton Reeve
- 1946–1952: The Rev. Robert Reginald Churchill
- 1946–1952: The Rev. Humphrey Gordon Barclay
- 1946–1952: The Rev. Ralph Creed Meredith
- 1946–1952: The Ven. Charles Henry Ritchie
- 1946–1952: The Rev. Walter Gordon Arrowsmith
- 1946–1952: Prebendary Hubert Harold Treacher
- 1947–1952: The Rev. Ian Hugh White-Thomson
- 1948–1952: Prebendary George Frederick Saywell
- 1948–1950: The Reverend Basil Montague Dale
- 1948–1952: Canon Eric Symes Abbott
- 1949–1952: Canon Ralph Layard Whytehead
- 1949–1952: The Rev. Peter Llewellyn Gillingham
- 1950–1952: The Rev. Lewis Mervyn Charles-Edwards
- 1951–1952: The Rev. Canon Leslie George Mannering
- 1951–1952: The Reverend Canon Frank Woods

===== Chaplains in Scotland =====
- 1937–1950: The Rev. Samuel James Ramsay Sibbald
- 1937–1939: The Very Rev. William Paterson Paterson
- 1937–1951: The Very Rev. John White
- 1937–1947: The Rev. Professor Archibald Main
- 1937–1952: The Very Rev. Norman MacLean
- 1937–1946: The Very Rev. Alexander Martin
- 1937–1951: The Very Rev. Robert J. Drummond
- 1937–1942: The Very Rev. Sir George Adam Smith
- 1937–1952: The Very Rev. Charles Laing Warr
- 1937–1944: The Rev. John Stirton ('Extra' 1937-1939)
- 1942–1949: The Very Rev. James Macdougall Black
- 1944–1952: The Very Rev. James Hutchison Cockburn
- 1946–1952: The Rev. Andrew Nevile Davidson
- 1947–1952: The Very Rev. John Baillie
- 1949–1952: The Rev. William White Anderson
- 1950–1951: The Rev. John Henry Duncan
- 1951–1952: The Rev. Thomas Bentley Stewart Thomson
- 1951–1952: The Rev. Prof. James Pitt Watson
- 1951–1952: The Rev. James Stuart Stewart

==== Chapels Royal ====
===== Dean of the Chapels Royal =====
- 1937–1939: The Rt Rev. and Rt Hon. Arthur Foley Winnington-Ingram, Bishop of London.
- 1939–1945: The Rt Rev. and Rt Hon. Geoffrey Francis Fisher, Bishop of London.
- 1945–1952: The Rt Rev. and Rt Hon. John William Charles Wand, Bishop of London.

====== Precentor of the Chapels Royal ======
- 1937–1941: Prebendary Launcelot Jefferson Percival
- 1941–1948: The Rev. Wallace Harold Elliott

====== Sub-Dean of the Chapels Royal ======
- 1948–1952: The Rev. Maurice Frederic Foxell

===== Priests =====
- 1937–1940: The Rev. Arthur Henry Owen McCheane
- 1937–1948: The Rev. Maurice Frederic Foxell
- 1937–1952: The Rev. Cyril Moxon Armitage
- 1940–1952: The Rev. Erik Francis Donne
- 1948–1952: The Rev. George Ernest Sage

====== Deputy Priest ======
- 1937–1940: The Rev. Erik Francis Donne
- 1940–1945: The Rev. Francis Charles Synge
- 1941–1952: The Rev. Michael Ridley
- 1945–1952: Canon Anthony Lewis Elliott Williams
- 1945–1952: The Reverend William Edward Lees

====== Honorary Priests ======
- 1937–1951: Canon Howard Gurney Daniell-Bainbridge
- 1937–1952: The Rev. Trevitt Reginald Hine-Haycock
- 1937–1941: The Rev. Leigh Hunter Nixon

===== Organist and Composer =====
- 1937–1952: Edgar Stanley Roper, Esq.

===== Domestic Chaplains =====
- 1937–1942: Prebendary Launcelot Jefferson Percival (Buckingham Palace).
- 1937–1944: The Very Rev. Albert Victor Baillie, Dean of Windsor (Windsor Castle).
- 1937–1942: The Rev. Arthur Rose Fuller (Sandringham).
- 1937–1952: The Rev. John Lamb (Domestic Chaplain to His Majesty in Scotland)
- 1942–1948: The Rev. Wallace Harold Elliott (Buckingham Palace).
- 1942–1952: The Rev. Hector David Anderson (Sandringham).
- 1944–1952: The Rt Rev. Eric Knightley Chetwode Hamilton, Dean of Windsor (Windsor Castle).
- 1948–1952: The Rev. Maurice Frederic Foxell (Buckingham Palace).

====== Chaplain, Hampton Court Palace ======
- 1937–1940: The Rev. Walter Kelly Firminger
- 1940–1947: The Rev. Lewis Verey
- 1947–1952: Prebendary Herbert Harris

====== Organist, Hampton Court Palace ======
- 1937–1952: William James Phillips, Esq.

=== Medical Household ===
==== Physicians ====
- 1937–1945: The Rt Hon. Bertrand Edward, Viscount Dawson of Penn
- 1937–1949: The Rt Hon. Thomas Jeeves, Baron Horder
- 1937–1952: Sir John Weir
- 1937–1949: Sir Maurice Alan Cassidy
- 1949–1952: Sir Horace Evans
- 1949–1952: Daniel Thomas Davies, Esq.

===== Extra Physicians =====
- 1937–1945: Sir (Edward) Farquhar Buzzard, Bt.
- 1937–1950: John Alfred Ryle, Esq.
- 1937–1941: George Frederick Still, Esq.
- 1937–1952: Henry Letheby Tidy, Esq.
- 1949–1952: The Rt Hon. Thomas Jeeves, Baron Horder

==== Serjeant Surgeon ====
- 1937–1939: Wilfred Trotter, Esq.
- 1939–1952: Sir Thomas Peel Dunhill

==== Surgeons ====
- 1937–1939: Sir Thomas Peel Dunhill
- 1937–1949: Sir James Walton
- 1937–1952: Sir Lancelot Edward Barrington-Ward
- 1946–1952: Arthur Espie Porritt, Esq.
- 1949–1952: Prof. James Rognvald Learmonth

===== Extra Surgeon =====
- 1949–1952: Sir James Walton

==== Surgeon Oculist ====
- 1937–1952: Sir Stewart Duke-Elder

===== Consulting Surgeon Oculist =====
- 1937–1944: Col. Sir William Tindall Lister

==== Manipulative Surgeon ====
- 1937–1949: Sir Morton Smart

===== Extra Manipulative Surgeon =====
- 1949–1952: Sir Morton Smart

==== Orthopaedic Surgeon ====
- 1946–1952: Sir Reginald Watson-Jones

==== Sergeant Surgeon-Dentist ====
- 1946–1949: Charles Sculthorpe Morris, Esq.

==== Surgeon Dentist ====
- 1937–1946: Charles Sculthorpe Morris, Esq.
- 1946–1952: Alan Cumbrae Rose McLeod, Esq.

==== Aurist ====
- 1946–1952: John Douglas McLaggan, Esq.

==== Surgeon Apothecary to His Majesty, and Apothecary to the Household ====
- 1937–1949: Sir (Frederick) Stanley Hewett

===== Extra Surgeon Apothecary to His Majesty =====
- 1949–1952: Sir Frederick Stanley Hewett

===== Apothecary to the Household =====
- 1949–1952: John Nigel Loring, Esq.

==== Physicians to the Household ====
- 1937–1948: Arnold Stott, Esq.
- 1937–1949: Daniel Thomas Davies, Esq.
- 1949–1952: Ronald Bodley Scott, Esq.

===== Extra Physicians to the Household =====
- 1948–1952: Sir Arnold Walmsley Stott

==== Surgeon to the Household ====
- 1937–1946: Arthur Espie Porritt, Esq.
- 1946–1952: Ralph Marnham, Esq.

==== Surgeon Oculist to the Household ====
- 1937–1952: Frank Anderson Juler, Esq.

==== Surgeon Dentist to the Household ====
- 1937–1948: Francis Desmond Donovan, Esq.

==== Surgeon Apothecary to the Household at Windsor ====
- 1937–1938: Sir Henry Linnington Martyn
- 1938–1952: Edmund Claud Malden, Esq.

==== Surgeon Apothecary to the Household at Sandringham ====
- 1937–1949: Sir Frederic Jeune Willans
- 1949–1952: James Lawrence Bunting Ansell, Esq.

=== Medical Household in Scotland ===
==== Physicians ====
- 1937–1947: John Cowan, Esq.
- 1937–1952: Alexander Greig Anderson, Esq.
- 1937–1952: John William McNee, Esq.
- 1947–1952: Leybourne Stanley Patrick Davidson

===== Extra Physicians =====
- 1937–1939: Sir Robert William Philip
- 1937: Sir Ashley Watson Mackintosh

==== Surgeons ====
- 1937–1947: Sir John Fraser
- 1937–1949: James Rognvald Learmonth, Esq.
- 1939–1952: George Gordon Bruce, Esq.

==== Surgeon Oculist ====
- 1937–1952: Arthur Henry Havens Sinclair

==== Surgeon Dentist in Scotland ====
- 1937–1947: Leslie Charles Broughton-Head, Esq.
- 1947–1952: Robert Charles Scott Dow, Esq.

==== Surgeon Apothecary to the Household at Balmoral ====
- 1937–1952: George Proctor Middleton, Esq.

==== Surgeon Apothecary to the Household at the Palace of Holyroodhouse ====
- 1937–1952: Norman Scott Carmichael

== Household of Queen Elizabeth (1936–1952), afterwards Queen Elizabeth the Queen Mother (1952–2002) ==
=== Lord Chamberlain ===
- 1937–1965: Col David Ogilvy, 12th Earl of Airlie
- 1965–1992: Simon Ramsay, 16th Earl of Dalhousie
- 1992–2002: Robert Lindsay, 29th Earl of Crawford

=== Comptroller ===
- 1953–1974: Lord Adam Gordon
- 1974–2002: Capt. Sir Alastair Aird (Comptroller and Extra Equerry)

=== Private secretary ===
- 1937–1946: Lt Col. Richard John Streatfeild
- 1946–1951: Maj. Thomas Harvey
- 1951–1956: Capt. Oliver Dawnay (Private Secretary and Equerry from 1953)
- 1956–1993: Lt-Col. Sir Martin Gilliat (Private Secretary and Equerry)
- 1993–2002: Capt. Sir Alastair Aird (Private Secretary, Comptroller and Equerry)

=== Treasurer ===
- 1937–1946: Sir Basil Brooke
- 1946–1960: Sir Arthur Penn
- 1961–1998: Maj. Sir Ralph Anstruther, Bt (Treasurer and Equerry) (Treasurer Emeritus 1998–2002)
- 1998–2002: Nicholas Assheton (Treasurer and Extra Equerry)

==== Assistant private secretary ====
- 1956–1959: Maj. the Hon. Francis Michael Legh (Assistant Private Secretary and Equerry)
- 1959–1964: Maj. Sir Ralph Anstruther, Bt (Assistant Private Secretary and Equerry)
- 1964–1973: Capt. Alastair Aird (Assistant Private Secretary and Extra Equerry)
- 1973–1993: vacant
- 1993–2002: Maj. Raymond Seymour (Assistant Private Secretary and Equerry)

=== Press secretary ===
- 1959–1991: Maj. Sir John Griffin (Press Secretary and Extra Equerry)

=== Equerry ===
- 1959–1984: Maj. the Hon. Sir Francis Legh
- 1984–1993: Maj. Raymond Seymour

==== Extra Equerry ====
- 1953–2002: Charles St Clair, 17th Lord Sinclair
- 1956–1984: Maj Raymond Seymour
- 1956–1962: Capt. Oliver Dawnay
- 1958–2002: Maj. Sir John Griffin
- 1974–1984: Lord Adam Gordon
- 1993–2002: Maj. William Richardson
- 1993–2002: Maj. David McMicking
- 1993–2002: Capt. Ashe Windham

==== Temporary Equerry ====
- 1955–1956: Maj. Raymond Seymour
- 1956–1958: Maj. John Griffin
- 1958–1960: Maj. William Richardson
- 1960–1964: Capt. Alastair Aird
- 1964: Capt. David J. McMicking
- 1966–1968: Capt. Peter H. Norman
- 1968–1970: Capt. R. L. Jenkins
- 1970-1972: Capt. I. W. Farquhar
- 1972–1974: Capt. Charles B. D. Baker
- 1974–1976: Capt. J. D. Miller
- 1976–1978: Capt. R. H. Grimshaw
- 1978–1980: Capt. J. J. Mainwaring-Burton
- 1980–1982: Capt. Ashe Windham
- 1982–1984: Capt. Jeremy Stopford
- 1984–1986: Capt. Jamie Lowther-Pinkerton
- 1986–1988 Capt. Niall Hall
- 1988–1990 Capt. Giles Bassett
- 1990–1992: Capt. C. R. Morris-Adams
- 1992–1994: Capt. the Hon. Edward Dawson-Damer
- 1994–1996: Maj. Colin Burgess
- 1996–1998: Maj. Andrew Charles Burrell MacEwan
- 1998–2000: Capt. William Jonathan de Rouet
- 2000–2002: Capt. Mark Patrick Munro Grayson

=== Mistress of the Robes ===
- 1937–1964: Helen Percy, Dowager Duchess of Northumberland
- 1964–1990: Kathleen Hamilton, Duchess of Abercorn
- 1990–2002: Vacant

=== Ladies of the Bedchamber ===
- 1937–1941: Viscountess Halifax (extra 1946–?)
- 1937–1947: Lady Nunburnholme
- 1937–1972: Cynthia Spencer, Countess Spencer
- 1937–1994: Patricia Smith, Viscountess Hambleden (as Dowager Viscountess from 1948)
- 1945–1967: Lady Harlech (extra 1941–1945; as Dowager Lady from 1964)
- 1947–1979: Katherine Lumley, Countess of Scarbrough, as Dowager Countess from 1969
- 1973–2002: Lady Grimthorpe (daughter of Katherine, Countess of Scarbrough)
- 1994–2002: Elizabeth Lumley, Countess of Scarbrough

=== Women of the Bedchamber ===
- 1937–1939: Lady Helen Graham
- 1937–1960: Lady Katharine Seymour
- 1937–1944: The Hon. Mrs Geoffrey Bowlby
- 1937–1961: Lady Hyde (Marion Hyde)
- 1939–1950: Lady Delia Peel
- 1944–1947: Lady Mary Theresa Herbert
- 1947–1982: Lady Jean Rankin
- 1950–1983: The Hon. Mrs John Mulholland
- 1960–1993: Ruth, Lady Fermoy
- 1961–1963: Lady Mary Katharine Harvey
- 1963–1965: Lady Lavinia Caroline Douglas-Home (temporary)
- 1965–2002: Mrs Patrick (later Dame Frances) Campbell-Preston (temporary prior to 1968)
- 1982–1993: Lady Elizabeth Basset
- 1983–2002: Lady Angela Mary Rose Oswald
- 1993–2002: The Hon. Mrs Rhodes
- 1993–2002: Mrs Michael Gordon-Lennox

==== Extra Women of the Bedchamber ====
- 1937–1994: Lady Victoria Wemyss (née Cavendish-Bentinck)
- 1939–1945: Lady Helen Violet Graham
- 1944–1988: The Hon. Mrs Geoffrey Bowlby (née Lettice Annesley)
- 1947–1948: Lady Mary Theresa Herbert
- 1947, 1982–2001: Lady Jean Margaret Florence Rankin
- 1947–1963: Lady Worsley
- 1948–1951: Pamela Hore-Ruthven (later Cooper), Viscountess Ruthven of Canberra
- 1950–1981: Lady Delia Peel
- 1956–1960: the Lady Fermoy
- 1959–1981, 1993–2000: Lady Elizabeth Basset
- 1960–1985: Lady Katharine Seymour
- 1961–1970: Lady Hyde
- 1981–1983: Lady Angela Mary Rose Oswald
- 1983–1984: the Hon. Mrs John Mulholland
- 1985–1990: Jane Katharine Walker-Okeover
- 1990–2002: Lady Margaret Colville
- 1991–1993: The Hon. Mrs Rhodes
- 1996–2002: Lady Penn
- 1999–2002: Catriona Bridget, Mrs Martin Leslie

=== Apothecary to the Household ===
- 1953–1966: Dr (later Sir) John Nigel Loring
- 1966–1986: Dr (later Sir) Ralph Southward
- 1986–2002: Dr (later Sir) Nigel Southward

=== Surgeon-Apothecary to the Household (Royal Lodge, Windsor) ===
- 1956–1965: Dr Richard May
- 1965–1986: Dr John P. Clayton
- 1986–1997: Dr John Briscoe
- 1997–2002: Dr Jonathan Holliday

=== Honorific positions ===
- Piper to the Queen Mother (1953–2002)

=== Pages of Honour ===
- 1962–1964: James Charteris, Lord Neidpath
- 1964–1966: John Dalrymple-Hamilton
- 1966–1967: Valentine Cecil
- 1967–1969: Richard Scott, Lord Eskdaill (later Duke of Buccleuch and Queensberry)
- 1969–1971: Simon Mulholland
- 1971–1973: Michael Bowes-Lyon, Lord Glamis (later Earl of Strathmore and Kinghorne)
- 1973–1974: Gilbert Clayton
- 1974–1975: Colin Campbell-Preston
- 1975–1977: Charles Bruce, Lord Bruce
- 1977–1979: Gavin Rankin
- 1979–1982: Henry Beaumont
- 1982–1984: Maurice Roche (later Baron Fermoy)
- 1984–1986: Andrew Hope, Viscount Aithrie (later Earl of Hopetoun)
- 1987–1989: Andrew Lillingston
- 1989–1991: Richard Lumley, Viscount Lumley (later Earl of Scarbrough)
- 1991–1993: John Carew-Pole
- 1993–1995: Arthur Wellesley, Earl of Mornington
- 1995–1998: Thomas Lumley
- 1998–1999: Harry Bengough
- 1999–2002: Andrew William Fergus Matheson

== See also ==
- Royal Households of the United Kingdom
