= Household of Edward VIII =

Departments of the British royal family

The Household of Edward VIII supported Edward VIII (1894-1972) during his eleven-month reign as monarch in 1936 (which lasted from his accession in January until his abdication in December). Previously, he had maintained a smaller Household as Prince of Wales (1910-1936).

The Royal Households of the United Kingdom consist of royal officials, office-holders and staff; members of the Royal Family who undertake public duties each have their own (separate or joint) Households.

== Household of the Prince of Wales (1910-1936) ==
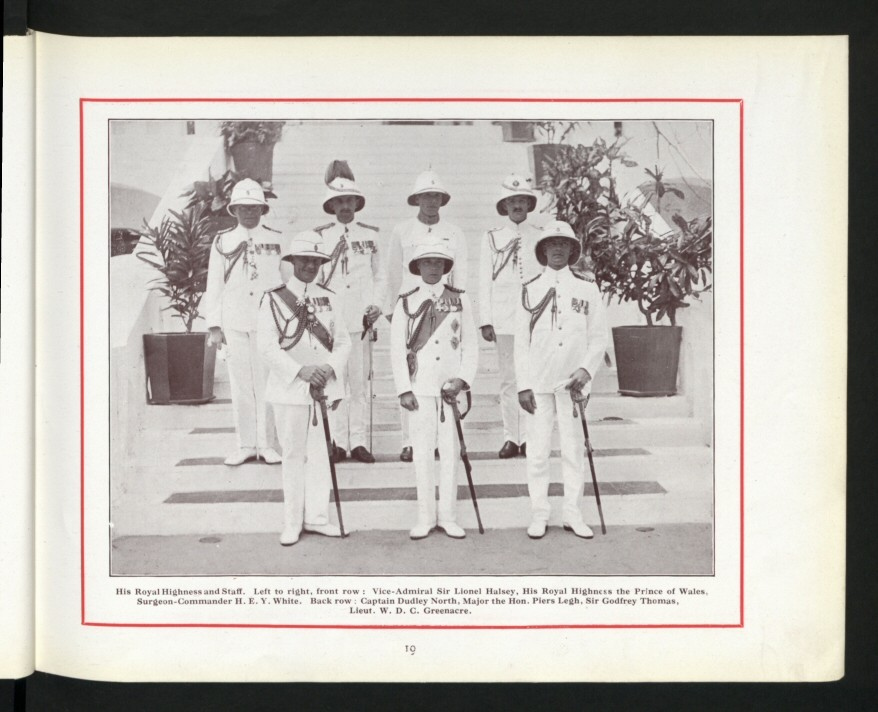
The Prince of Wales (centre), pictured with members of his Household (including his Comptroller and Treasurer, Private Secretary and Equerries) during a royal visit to the Gold Coast.

Initially, appointments to the Prince of Wales's Household were made by his father, the King; but in 1915, having come of age, Edward began to make his own Household appointments.

=== Treasurer ===
- 1910–1915: Walter Peacock, Esq.

==== Equerry ====
- 1912–1914: Maj. the Hon. William George Sydney Cadogan

=== Comptroller and Treasurer ===
- 1915–1920: The Hon. Sir Sidney Robert Greville
- 1920–1936: Rear-Adm. Sir Lionel Halsey

=== Private Secretary ===
- 1921–1936: Sir Godfrey John Vignoles Thomas, Bt.

==== Assistant Private Secretary ====
- 1919–1921: Sir Godfrey John Vignoles Thomas, Bt.
- 1921–1929: Capt. Alan Frederick Lascelles

=== Groom in Waiting ===
- 1921–1936: Brig.-Gen. Gerald Frederic Trotter

=== Equerries-in-Ordinary ===
- 1919–1921: Capt. Lord Claud Hamilton
- 1919–1936: Capt. the Hon. Piers Walter Legh
- 1921–1929: Lt the Hon. Bruce A. A. Ogilvy
- 1924–1926: Lt W. D. C. Greenacre
- 1931–1933: Flt Lt John Denholm Armour
- 1933–1936: Flt Lt H. M. Mellor (Air Equerry)

==== Extra Equerries ====
- 1921–1936: Rear-Adm. Sir Lionel Halsey
- 1921–1936: Capt. Dudley B. N. North
- 1925–1936: Brig.-Gen. Gerald Frederic Trotter
- 1926–1936: Lt W. D. C. Greenacre
- 1933–1936: Flt Lt Edward H. Fielden (Chief Air Pilot and Extra Equerry)

==== Temporary Equerry ====
- 1922–1926: Captain E. D. Metcalfe
- 1929–1936: Capt. J. R. Aird

=== Physicians in Ordinary ===
- 1923–1936: Lord Dawson of Penn
- 1923–1936: Sir Thomas Horder
- 1923–1936: Dr. John Weir

=== Surgeon in Ordinary ===
- 1923–1936: Lt-Col. Sir Hugh Rigby

=== Surgeon Apothecary to His Royal Highness and his Household ===
- 1923–1936: Sir Stanley Hewett

=== Surgeon-Dentist ===
- 1924–1931: Mr. Victor Smith

== Household of King Edward VIII (1936) ==
=== Lord Chamberlain ===
- The Rt Hon. Rowland Thomas, Earl of Cromer

=== Lord Steward ===
- George Granville, Duke of Sutherland

=== Master of the Horse ===
- Henry Hugh Arthur Fitzroy, Duke of Beaufort

=== Private Secretary ===
- Maj. the Hon. Alexander Henry Louis Hardinge

==== Assistant Private Secretaries ====
- Sir Godfrey John Vignoles Thomas, Bt.
- Frank Herbert Mitchell, Esq.
- Alan Frederick Lascelles, Esq.

=== The King's Archives ===
==== Keeper ====
- Col. the Rt Hon. Clive, Baron Wigram

===== Assistant Keeper =====
- Owen Frederick Morshead, Esq.

=== Keeper of the Privy Purse ===
- Maj. James Ulick Francis Canning Alexander

=== The Almonry ===
==== High Almoner ====
- The Most Reverend and Right Hon. Cosmo Gordon Lang (Archbishop of Canterbury)

===== Sub-Almoner =====
- Prebendary Launcelot Jefferson Percival

=== Lords in Waiting ===
- Henry Rainald, Viscount Gage
- Geoffrey William Richard Hugh, Earl of Munster
- Charles William Slingsby, Earl of Feversham
- Hugh William Osbert, Earl of Sefton
- Peregrine Francis Adelbert, Baron Brownlow
- Basil Sheridan, Marquess of Dufferin and Ava
- John Henry George, Earl of Erne

=== Master of the Robes ===
- The Rt Hon. Edward Arthur, Baron Colebrooke

=== His Majesty's Comptroller at Ascot ===
- The Rt Hon. Bernard Arthur William Patrick Hastings, Earl of Granard

=== Master of the Household ===
- Brig. Gen. Sir Smith Hill Child

=== Comptroller, Lord Chamberlain's Office ===
- Maj. Terence Edmund Gascoigne Nugent

==== Assistant Comptroller, Lord Chamberlain's Office ====
- Maj. Norman Wilmshurst Gwatkin

==== Examiners of Plays ====
- George Slythe Street, Esq.
- Henry Clement Game, Esq.

==== Secretary of the Central Chancery of the Orders of Knighthood ====
- Maj. Henry Hudson Fraser Stockley

=== Marshal of the Diplomatic Corps ===
- Lt-Gen. Sir George Sidney Clive

==== Vice Marshal ====
- John Berkeley Monck, Esq.

==== Assistant Marshal ====
- Capt. Sir John Lindsay Dashwood, Bt.

=== Crown Equerry ===
- Col. Sir Arthur Erskine

=== Equerries ===
- Lt Col. the Hon. Piers Walter Legh
- Maj. Sir John Renton Aird, Bt. (Extra Equerry from 2 November)
- Wing Cdr Edward Hedley Fielden (Captain of the King's Flight)
- Cdr Charles Edward Lambe, R.N.

==== Extra Equerries ====
- Adm. the Hon. Sir Hubert George Brand
- Adm. Sir Henry Tritton Buller
- Col. the Hon. Sir George Arthur Charles Crichton
- The Rt Hon. Rowland Thomas, Earl of Cromer
- Capt. the Hon. Sir Seymour John Fortescue
- Maj.-Gen. Lord Edward Gleichen
- Capt. Sir Bryan Godfrey Godfrey Faussett
- Major Colin Lindsay Gordon
- Capt. Walter Douglas Campbell Greenacre
- Adm. Sir Lionel Halsey
- Maj.-Gen. Sir John Hanbury Williams
- Maj. the Rt Hon. Alexander Henry Louis Hardinge
- Adm. Sir Colin Richard Keppel
- The Hon. Sir Derek William George Keppel
- Adm. the Hon. Sir Herbert Meade Fetherstonhaugh
- Adm. Sir Archibald Berkeley Milne, Bart.
- Vice-Adm. Dudley Burton Napier North
- Brig.-Gen. George Camborne Beauclerk Paynter
- Maj. Sir Edward Seymour
- Col. Sir Henry Streatfeild
- Brig. Henry Archdale Tomkinson
- Maj. the Hon. Sir John Hubert Ward
- Maj.-Gen. Sir Harry Davis Watson
- Col. the Rt Hon. Clive, Baron Wigram

=== Honorary Veterinary Surgeons ===
- Maj. Sir Frederick Hobday
- John Willett, Esq.

=== Extra Grooms in Waiting ===
- The Hon Sir Montague Charles Eliot
- Sir Harry Lloyd-Verney
- The Hon. Sir Harry Julian Stonor
- Maj. Sir Philip Hunloke
- Col. Sir Victor Audley Mackenzie, Bt.

=== Gentlemen Ushers ===
- Capt. Charles Alexander Lindsay Irvine
- Col. Edmund Vivian Gabriel
- Capt. Humphrey Clifford LLoyd
- Lt-Col. Henry Valentine Bache de Satgé
- Col. the Hon. Sir George Sidney Herbert, Bt.
- John Hanbury-Williams, Esq.
- Maj. John Lamplugh Wickham
- Lt-Col. Frederick Edward Packe

==== Extra Gentlemen Ushers ====
- Maj. Gerald Montagu Augustus Ellis
- Col. Lord William Cecil
- Brig.-Gen. Montagu Grant Wilkinson
- Maj. Berkeley John Talbot Levett
- Paymaster-Rear-Adm. Sir Hamnet Holditch Share
- Adm. Philip Nelson-Ward
- Lt-Col. Sir Arthur D'Arcy Gordon Bannerman, Bt.

==== Gentleman Usher to the Sword of State ====
- Gen. Sir Lewis Stratford Tollemache Halliday

==== Gentleman Usher of the Black Rod ====
- Lt-Gen. Sir William Pulteney

=== Pages of Honour ===
- George Edward Charles Hardinge, Esq.
- George Raymond Seymour, Esq.
- Rognvald Richard Farrer, Baron Herschell.

=== Sergeants at Arms ===
- Capt. Sir Ernest Beachcroft Beckwith Towse
- Frederic Stanley Osgood, Esq.
- Maj. Henry Hudson Fraser Stockley

==== Sergeant at Arms, House of Lords ====
- Maj. Gen. Sir Charles Edward Corkran

==== Sergeant at Arms, House of Commons ====
- Brig. Charles Alfred Howard

=== Constable and Governor of Windsor Castle ===
- Maj.-Gen. the Rt Hon. Alexander Augustus Frederick William Alfred George, Earl of Athlone

==== Deputy Constable and Lieutenant Governor ====
- Col. the Rt Hon. Clive, Baron Wigram

==== Librarian ====
- Owen Frederick Morshead, Esq.

=== Keeper of the Jewel House, Tower of London ===
- Maj.-Gen. Sir George John Younghusband

=== Surveyor of The King's Pictures ===
- Kenneth McKenzie Clark, Esq.

=== Surveyor of The King's Works of Art ===
- Lord Gerald Wellesley

=== Master of the Music ===
- Sir Henry Walford Davies

=== Poet Laureate ===
- John Masefield, Esq.

=== Coroner of the Household ===
- Lt-Col. William Hilgrove Leslie McCarthy

=== Ecclesiastical Household ===
==== College of Chaplains ====
===== Clerk of the Closet =====
- The Rt Rev. Thomas Banks Strong, Bishop of Oxford

====== Deputy Clerk of the Closet ======
- Prebendary Launcelot Jefferson Percival

===== Chaplains =====
- Prebendary John Henry Joshua Ellison
- The Rev. Sir Francis Arthur Stanley ffolkes, Bt.
- The Rev. Hugh Singleton Wood
- Canon Peter Green
- The Rev. Samuel Bickersteth
- Canon Alan England Brooke
- Canon Travers Guy Rogers
- The Rev. Frederick Ingall Anderson
- Canon Bertram Keir Cunningham
- The Rev. Edward Keble Talbot
- The Rev. Edward Mewburn Walker
- Canon Charles Earle Raven
- The Very Rev. Thomas Heywood Masters, Provost of Portsmouth.
- The Rev. Charles John Shebbeare
- The Very Rev. Alfred Charles Eustace Jarvis, Provost of Sheffield.
- The Rev. Clarence Haselwood Hamilton
- Canon Arthur Rowland Harry Grant
- The Rev. Wallace Harold Elliott
- The Rev. Frederic Athelwold Iremonger
- The Rev. William Patrick Glyn McCormick
- Canon Frederick Homes Dudden
- Canon Frank Russell Barry
- The Very Rev. Frederick Brodie Macnutt, Provost of Leicester.
- The Rev. Harold Costley-White
- Canon William John Telia Phythian Phythian-Adams
- Canon John Charles Halland How
- Canon Oliver Chase Quick
- Canon Anthony Charles Deane
- The Rev. Alan Campbell Don
- The Ven. Archdeacon Richard Brook
- Canon Hugh Richard Lawrie Sheppard
- The Rev. Ernest Hayford Thorold
- The Ven. Archdeacon Leslie Stannard Hunter
- The Rev. Robert Milner Gibson
- The Rev. Philip Thomas Byard Clayton
- Canon Leonard Martin Andrews

===== Chaplains in Ordinary in Scotland =====
- The Very Rev. Samuel James Ramsay Sibbald
- The Very Rev. Professor William Paterson Paterson
- The Rev. John White
- The Rev. Archibald Main
- The Rev. Norman MacLean
- The Rev. Alexander Martin
- The Rev. Robert J. Drummond
- The Very Rev. Sir George Adam Smith
- The Very Rev. Charles Laing Warr

====== Extra Chaplain to His Majesty in Scotland ======
- The Rev. John Stirton

==== Chapels Royal ====
===== Dean of the Chapels Royal =====
- The Rt Rev. and Rt Hon. Arthur Foley Winnington-Ingram, Bishop of London.

====== Precentor of the Chapels Royal ======
- Prebendary Launcelot Jefferson Percival

===== Priests in Ordinary =====
- The Rev. Arthur Henry Owen McCheane
- The Rev. Maurice Frederic Foxell
- The Rev. Cyril Moxon Armitage

====== Deputy Priest ======
- The Rev. Erik Francis Donne

====== Honorary Priests ======
- Canon Howard Gurney Daniell-Bainbridge
- The Rev. Trevitt Reginald Hine-Haycock
- The Rev. Leigh Hunter Nixon

===== Organist and Composer =====
- Edgar Stanley Roper, Esq.

===== Domestic Chaplains =====
- Prebendary Launcelot Jefferson Percival (Buckingham Palace).
- The Very Rev. Albert Victor Baillie, Dean of Windsor (Windsor Castle).
- The Rev. Arthur Rose Fuller (Sandringham).

====== Chaplain, Hampton Court Palace ======
- The Rev. Walter Kelly Firminger

====== Organist, Hampton Court Palace ======
- William James Phillips, Esq.

=== Medical Household ===
==== Physicians in Ordinary ====
- The Rt Hon. Bertrand Edward, Viscount Dawson of Penn
- The Rt Hon. Thomas Jeeves, Baron Horder
- Sir (Edward) Farquhar Buzzard, Bt.

===== Physicians Extraordinary =====
- Sir Maurice Alan Cassidy
- John Alfred Ryle, Esq.

==== Serjeant Surgeon ====
- Wilfred Trotter, Esq.

==== Surgeons ====
- Sir Thomas Peel Dunhill
- Sir James Walton

==== Surgeon Oculist ====
- Sir Stewart Duke-Elder

===== Consulting Surgeon Oculist =====
- Col. Sir William Tindall Lister

==== Manipulative Surgeon ====
- Sir Morton Smart

==== Surgeon Apothecary to His Majesty, and Apothecary to the Household ====
- Sir (Frederick) Stanley Hewett

==== Physician to the Household ====
- Arnold Stott, Esq.

==== Surgeon to the Household ====
- Sir James Walton

==== Surgeon Oculist to the Household ====
- Frank Anderson Juler, Esq.

==== Surgeon Dentist to the Household ====
- Francis Desmond Donovan, Esq.

==== Surgeon Apothecary to the Household at Windsor ====
- Sir Henry Linnington Martyn

==== Surgeon Apothecary to the Household at Sandringham ====
- Sir Frederic Jeune Willans

=== Medical Household in Scotland ===
==== Physicians in Scotland ====
- John Cowan, Esq.
- Sir Ashley Watson Mackintosh
- Alexander Greig Anderson, Esq.

===== Extra Physician in Scotland =====
- Sir Robert William Philip

==== Surgeons in Scotland ====
- Sir John Fraser
- James Rognvald Learmonth, Esq.

==== Surgeon Oculist in Scotland ====
- Arthur Henry Havens Sinclair

==== Surgeon Dentist in Scotland in Scotland ====
- Leslie Charles Broughton-Head, Esq.

==== Surgeon Apothecary to the Household at Balmoral ====
- George Proctor Middleton, Esq.

==== Surgeon Apothecary to the Household at the Palace of Holyroodhouse ====
- Norman Scott Carmichael

== See also ==
- Royal Households of the United Kingdom
