= List of knights and dames commander of the Royal Victorian Order appointed by Elizabeth II (1952–1977) =

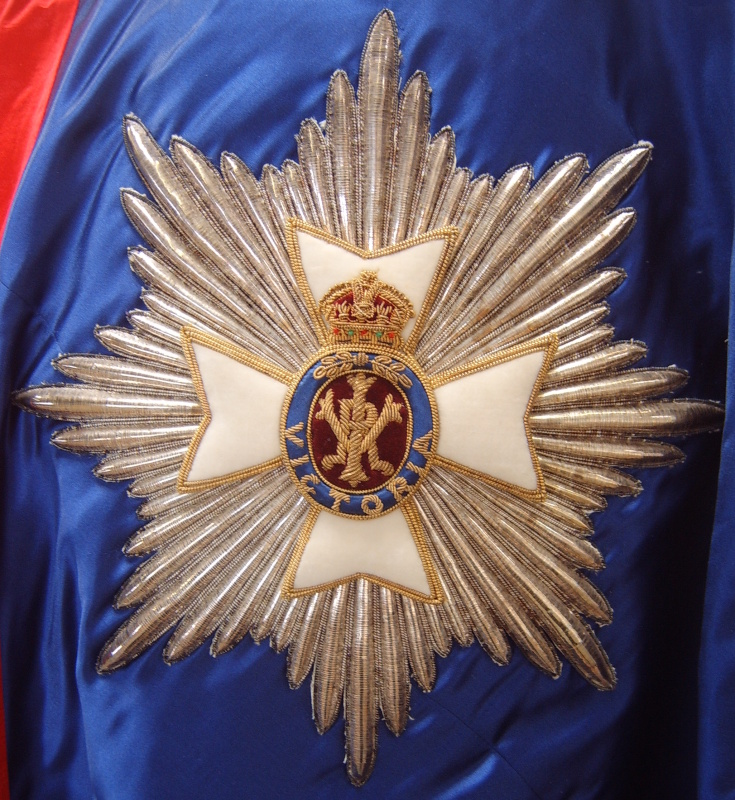
The star of a Knight or Dame Grand Cross of the Royal Victorian Order

The Royal Victorian Order is an order of knighthood awarded by the sovereign of the United Kingdom and several Commonwealth realms. It is granted personally by the monarch and recognises personal service to the monarchy, the Royal Household, royal family members, and the organisation of important royal events. The order was officially created and instituted on 23 April 1896 by letters patent under the Great Seal of the Realm by Queen Victoria. It was instituted with five grades, the two highest of which were Knight Grand Cross (GCVO) and Knight Commander (KCVO), which conferred the status of knighthood on holders (apart from foreigners, who typically received honorary awards not entitling them to the style of a knight). Women were not admitted until Edward VIII altered the statutes of the order in 1936; those receiving the highest two awards were styled dames and those grades, when conferred on women, are Dame Grand Cross (GCVO) and Dame Commander (DCVO).

No limit was placed on the number of appointments which could be made. Queen Elizabeth II (reigned since 1952) appointed 288 Knights Commander and 19 Dames Commander of the order during the first 25 years of her reign (from her accession to the end of 1977).

== Knights and dames commander appointed by Elizabeth II ==
The list below is ordered by date of appointment. Full names, ranks and titles are given where applicable, as correct at the time of appointment to the order. Branch of service or regiment details are given in parentheses to distinguish them from offices. The names, dates, offices and occasions listed are those given by Peter Galloway in his 1996 history of the order, Royal Service.

Name	Date	Notes
Albert George Allen, DSO, MC	5 June 1952	For personal services as solicitor to members of the Royal Family
Anthony Bevir, CVO, CBE	5 June 1952	For personal services to the Sovereign as the Prime Minister's Private Secretary
The Earl of Eldon	5 June 1952	Lord in Waiting to George VI
Edward Hedley Fielden, CB, CVO, DFC, AFC	5 June 1952	Captain of The Queen's Flight and Extra Equerry to the Queen
Robert Harvey Kearsley, CMG, CVO, DSO	5 June 1952	Lieutenant of the Honorable Corps of Gentlemen-at-Arms
Sir William Henry Peat, GBE	5 June 1952	Auditor of the Privy Purse
Victor Michael Barrington-Ward, CBE, DSO	5 June 1952	Member of the Railway Executive, appointed in connection with the Royal Train
The Viscount Clifden, MVO	25 November 1952	Member of the Council for the Duchy of Cornwall
Sir Leslie Cecil Blackmore Bowker, OBE, MC	1 January 1953	Remembrancer, City of London
Thomas Chadwick, CVO, CBE	1 January 1953	Accountant, HM Treasury
Hon. Harold George Nicolson, CMG	1 January 1953	For personal services in the field of Literature
The Baron Tryon, DSO	1 January 1953	Keeper of the Privy Purse, Treasurer to the Queen and Secretary of the Royal Victorian Order
Sir George Dyson	13 February 1953	Director of the Royal College of Music
Dorothy Wood, Countess of Halifax, CI	1 June 1953	Extra Lady of the Bedchamber to Queen Elizabeth the Queen Mother
The Dowager Viscountess Hambledon	1 June 1953	Lady of the Bedchamber to Queen Elizabeth the Queen Mother
The Countess Spencer, OBE	1 June 1953	Lady of the Bedchamber to Queen Elizabeth the Queen Mother
Sir Arnold Edward Trevor Bax	1 June 1953	Master of the Queen's Music
Hon. Sir George Rothe Bellew, CVO	1 June 1953	Garter Principal King of Arms and Honorary Genealogist to the Royal Victorian Order
Sir John Reginald Hornby Nott-Bower, CVO	1 June 1953	Deputy Commissioner, Metropolitan Police
Sir Arthur Bromley, KCMG	1 June 1953	Gentleman Usher to the Queen
Sir Frederick Arthur Montague Browning, KBE, CB, DSO	1 June 1953	Treasurer to the Duke of Edinburgh
Geoffrey Ronald Codrington, CB, CMG, CVO, DSO, OBE, TD	1 June 1953	Gentleman Usher to the Queen
Hon. John Spencer Coke, CVO	1 June 1953	Equerry to Queen Mary
Sir Rupert de la Bere	1 June 1953	Lord Mayor of London, appointed on the occasion of the Queen's coronation
Cedric Drewe	1 June 1953	Treasurer of the Household, appointed on the occasion of the Queen's coronation
David McAdam Eccles	1 June 1953	Minister of Works, appointed on the occasion of the Queen's coronation
Sir Harold Corti Emmerson, KCB	1 June 1953	Permanent Secretary at the Ministry of Works, appointed on the occasion of the Queen's coronation
Randle Guy Feilden, CB, CBE	1 June 1953	Chief Gold Staff Officer, appointed on the occasion of the Queen's coronation
Arthur Guy Salisbury-Jones, CMG, CBE, MC	1 June 1953	Marshal of the Diplomatic Corps
Sir Percivale Liesching, GCMG, KCB	1 June 1953	Permanent Under Secretary of State at the Commonwealth Relations Office, appointed on the occasion of the Queen's coronation
Edgar William Light, CMG, MVO, OBE	1 June 1953	(Foreign Office)
Philip Reginald Margetson, CVO, MC	1 June 1953	Assistant Commissioner, Metropolitan Police
Henry Austin Strutt, CB, CVO	1 June 1953	Assistant Under Secretary of State at the Home Office, appointed on the occasion of the Queen's coronation
Julian Alvery Gascoigne, CB, DSO	1 July 1953	General Officer Commanding, London District
John Arthur Symons Eccles, CB, CBE	16 July 1953	In connection with the Naval Review, appointed on the occasion of the Queen's coronation
Sir Henry William Urquhart McCall, KBE, CB, DSO	16 July 1953	In connection with the Naval Review, appointed on the occasion of the Queen's coronation
Maurice Brian Dowse, CB, CBE	16 July 1953	Director of Personal Services at the War Office, appointed on the occasion of the Queen's coronation
Sir Victor Emmanuel Groom, KBE, CB, DFC	16 July 1953	In connection with the Royal Air Force Review, appointed on the occasion of the Queen's coronation
Sir Dermot Alexander Boyle, KBE, CB, AFC	16 July 1953	In connection with the Royal Air Force Review, appointed on the occasion of the Queen's coronation
Sir Alexander Hood, GBE, KCB	24 November 1953	Governor of Bermuda, appointed on the occasion of the Queen's visit to Bermuda
Sir Hugh Mackintosh Foot, KCMG, OBE	27 November 1953	Governor of Jamaica, appointed on the occasion of the Queen's visit to Jamaica
Sir Ronald Herbert Garvey, KCMG, MBE	18 December 1953	Governor of Fiji, appointed on the occasion of the Queen's visit to Fiji
Gerald Curteis, MVO	1 January 1954	Deputy Master, Trinity House
Irving Blanchard Gane	1 January 1954	City Chamberlain, London
The Rt Rev. Percy Mark Herbert	1 January 1954	Lord Bishop of Norwich and Clerk of the Closet
James McFadyen McNeill, CBE, MC	1 January 1954	Deputy Chairman and Managing Director, John Brown and Company Limited, builders of HMY Britannia
William Alexander Bodkin	29 January 1954	Minister for Internal Affairs and Social Security in New Zealand, appointed on the occasion of the Queen's visit to New Zealand
Sir John Northcott, KCMG, CB, MVO	12 February 1954	Governor of New South Wales, appointed on the occasion of the Queen's visit to Australia
Sir Ronald Hubbert Cross, Bt	22 February 1954	Governor of Tasmania, appointed on the occasion of the Queen's visit to Australia
Sir Reginald Alexander Dallas Brooks, KCB, KCMG, DSO	8 March 1954	Governor of Victoria, appointed on the occasion of the Queen's visit to Australia
Sir John Dudley Lavarack, KBE, CB, MC	17 March 1954	Governor of Queensland, appointed on the occasion of the Queen's visit to Australia
Sir Robert Allingham George, KBE, CB, MC	26 March 1954	Governor of South Australia, appointed on the occasion of the Queen's visit to Australia
Frank Horton Berryman, CB, CBE, DSO	1 April 1954	Director General of the Royal Tour of Australia, appointed on the occasion of the Queen's visit to Australia
Sir Charles Henry Gairdner, KCMG, CB, CBE	1 April 1954	Governor of Western Australia, appointed on the occasion of the Queen's visit to Australia
Eric John Harrison	1 April 1954	Minister in Attendance, appointed on the occasion of the Queen's visit to Australia
Sir Oliver Ernest Goonetilleke, KCMG, KBE	21 April 1954	Finance Minister and Minister in Attendance, appointed on the occasion of the Queen's visit to Ceylon.
David Aitchison	26 April 1954	Master of SS Gothic, appointed on the occasion of the Queen's visit to New Zealand, Australia, Ceylon and Aden
Sir Tom Hickinbotham, KCMG, CIE, OBE	27 April 1954	Governor of Aden, appointed on the occasion of the Queen's visit to Aden
Sir Andrew Benjamin Cohen, KCMG, OBE	30 April 1954	Governor of Uganda, appointed on the occasion of the Queen's visit to Uganda
Sir Gerald Hallen Creasy, KCMG, OBE	7 May 1954	Governor of Malta, appointed on the occasion of the Queen's visit to Malta
Sir Gordon Holmes Alexander MacMillan of MacMillan, KCB, CBE, DSO, MC	11 May 1954	Governor of Gibraltar, appointed on the occasion of the Queen's visit to Gibraltar
Edward Michael Conolly Abel-Smith, CB, CVO	15 May 1954	Flag Officer, Royal Yachts and Extra Equerry to the Queen
William Henry Harris, CVO	10 June 1954	Organist and Master of the Choristers, St George's Chapel, Windsor
Hon. Sir Albert Edward Alexander Napier, KCB, QC	10 June 1954	Clerk of the Crown in Chancery
The Rt Rev. Eric Knightley Chetwode Hamilton	1 January 1955	Dean of Windsor and Domestic Chaplain to the Queen
Sir Gerald Festus Kelly	1 January 1955	President, Royal Academy
John Crocker Bulteel, DSO, MC	9 June 1955	Secretary, Ascot Authority
Eric Humphrey Savill, CVO, CBE, MC	9 June 1955	Deputy Ranger, Windsor Great Park
The Rt Rev. John William Charles Wand	9 June 1955	Bishop of London and Dean of the Chapels Royal
Peter William Shelley Yorke Scarlett, CMG	26 June 1955	HM Ambassador in Oslo, appointed on the occasion of the Queen's visit to Norway
Alexander Greig Anderson, CVO	2 January 1956	Honorary Physician to the Queen's Household in Scotland
Albert Edward Richardson	2 January 1956	President, Royal Academy
Sir George Henry Wilkinson, Bt	2 January 1956	Chairman, Executive Committee, King George VI National Memorial Fund and King George VI Foundation
Sir Bryan Evers Sharwood-Smith, KCMG, KBE, ED	3 February 1956	Governor of the Northern Region of Nigeria, appointed on the occasion of the Queen's visit to Nigeria
Sir Clement John Pleass, KCMG, KBE	9 February 1956	Governor of the Eastern Region of Nigeria, appointed on the occasion of the Queen's visit to Nigeria
Sir John Dalzell Rankine, KCMG	15 February 1956	Governor of the Western Region of Nigeria, appointed on the occasion of the Queen's visit to Nigeria
Ralph Francis Alnwick Grey, CMG, OBE	16 February 1956	Chief Secretary of the Federation of Nigeria, appointed on the occasion of the Queen's visit
Anthony Frederick Blunt, CVO	31 May 1956	Surveyor of the Queen's Pictures. (Appointment cancelled 16 November 1979.)
Henry Valentine Bache de Satgé, CMG, CVO, DSO	31 May 1956	Gentleman Usher to the Queen
Hon. Sir Robert Maurice Alers Hankey, KCMG	10 June 1956	HM Ambassador in Stockholm, appointed on the occasion of the Queen's visit to Sweden
Hon. Osbert Eustace Vesey, CMG, CVO, OBE	1 November 1956	Clerk of the Cheque and Adjutant, The Honorurable Corps of Gentlemen-at-Arms
Sir John Henry D'Albiac, KBE, CB, DSO	1 January 1957	Commandant of London Airport
Sir James Gow Mann	1 January 1957	Surveyor of the Queen's Works of Art
Sir Arthur Espie Porritt, KCMG, CBE	1 January 1957	Serjeant Surgeon to the Queen
Sir Charles Norman Stirling, KCMG	19 February 1957	HM Ambassador in Lisbon, appointed on the occasion of the Queen's visit to Portugal
Marcus John Cheke, CMG, CVO	17 May 1957	Vice-Marshal, Diplomatic Corps
Sir Roderick Edward Barclay, KCMG, CVO	23 May 1957	HM Ambassador in Copenhagen, appointed on the occasion of the Queen's visit to Denmark
Edward William Spencer Ford, CB, MVO	13 June 1957	Assistant Private Secretary to the Queen
George Frederick Johnson, CB, CBE, DSO	13 June 1957	General Officer Commanding, London District
Ralph Marnham	13 June 1957	Surgeon to the Queen
Sir John Mitchell Harvey Wilson, Bt, CVO	13 June 1957	Keeper of the Royal Philatelic Collection
Sir Harold Anthony Caccia, KCMG	20 October 1957	HM Ambassador in Washington, appointed on the occasion of the Queen's visit to the United States of America
Sir Leslie Knox Munro, KCMG	20 October 1957	HM Ambassador for New Zealand to the United States, appointed on the occasion of the Queen's visit to the United States of America
Hon. Sir Percy Claude Spender, KBE	20 October 1957	
Charles Thomas Wheeler, CBE	1 January 1958	President, Royal Academy
Sir Paul Mason, KCMG	27 March 1958	HM Ambassador in the Hague, appointed on the occasion of the Queen's visit to the Netherlands.
Sir Arthur William Jarratt	12 June 1958	Honorary President, Kinematograph Members Society
John Dougles McLaggan, CVO	12 June 1958	Aurist to the Queen
John Wheeler Wheeler-Bennett, CMG, OBE	1 January 1959	For personal services in the field of Literature
The Rev. Cyril Leonard Cresswell, CVO	1 January 1959	Chaplain, Royal Victorian Order
Arthur Grant Harper, CVO, CBE	1 January 1959	For services in connection with Royal Visits to New Zealand
Ivan de la Bere, CB, CVO, CBE	13 June 1959	Secretary, Central Chancery of Orders of Knighthood
Hon. David Bowes-Lyon	13 June 1959	Lord Lieutenant, Hertfordshire, and President, Royal Horticultural Society
Sir Archibald Montague Henry Gray, CBE, TD	13 June 1959	Chairman, Distribution Committee, King Edward's Hospital Fund for London
Wilfred Percy Henry Sheldon, CVO	13 June 1959	Physician-Paediatrician
James Newton Rodney Moore, CB, CBE, DSO	13 June 1959	General Officer Commanding, London District
Ivan Whiteside Magill, CVO	1 January 1960	Anaesthetist
John Harold Peel	8 March 1960	For personal services to The Queen
Ronald Montague Joseph Harris, CB, MVO	11 June 1960	Second Commissioner, Crown Estate
Lady Constance Harriet Stuart Milnes-Gaskell, CVO	23 December 1960	Lady-in-Waiting to the Duchess of Kent
Denis John Wolko Browne	31 December 1960	
Alan Philip Hay, CVO, TD	31 December 1960	Comptroller and Private Secretary to the Duchess of Kent
Robert Somerville, CVO	31 December 1960	Clerk of the Council of the Duchy of Lancaster
Sir Alexander Colin Burlington Symon, KCMG, OBE	16 February 1961	High Commissioner in Pakistan, appointed on the occasion of the Queen's visit to Pakistan
Leonard Arthur Scopes, CMG, OBE	28 February 1961	HM Ambassador in Kathmandu, appointed on the occasion of the Queen's visit to Nepal
Sir Paul Henry Gore-Booth, KCMG	1 March 1961	High Commissioner in New Delhi, appointed on the occasion of the Queen's visit to India
Sir Geoffrey Wedgwood Harrison, KCMG	6 March 1961	HM Ambassador in Tehran, appointed on the occasion of the Queen's visit to Iran
Marion Féodorovna Louise Villiers, Baroness Hyde, CVO	6 June 1961	Woman of the Bedchamber to Queen Elizabeth the Queen Mother
Lady Katherine Seymour, CVO	6 June 1961	Woman of the Bedchamber to Queen Elizabeth the Queen Mother
The Baron Ashburton	10 June 1961	Treasurer, King Edward's Hospital Fund for London
Sir Charles William Dixon, KCMG, OBE	10 June 1961	Commonwealth Relation's Office, appointed on the occasion of the Queen's Asian Tour
Basil Smallpeice	10 June 1961	Managing Director of BOAC, appointed for personal services
Anthony Richard Wagner, CVO	7 July 1961	Garter Principal King of Arms
The Rt Rev. Henry Colville Montgomery Campbell, MC	1 November 1961	Bishop of London and Dean of the Chapels Royal
Peter Dawnay, CB, MVO, DSC	2 December 1961	Flag Officer, Royal Yachts
Sir Edward Henry Windley, KCMG	5 December 1961	Governor of the Gambia, appointed on the occasion of the Queen's visit to the Gambia
Katharine Isobel Lumley, Countess of Scarbrough	1 January 1962	Extra Lady of the Bedchamber to Queen Elizabeth the Queen Mother
Martin John Gilliat, CVO, MBE	1 January 1962	Private Secretary and Equerry to Queen Elizabeth the Queen Mother
George Proctor Middleton, CVO	1 January 1962	Surgeon-Apothecary to the Royal Household at Balmoral
Mark Vane Milbank, CVO, MC	1 January 1962	Master of the Household and Extra Equerry to the Queen
Sir Arthur Wendell Snelling, KCMG	1 January 1962	High Commissioner in Ghana
Sir Robert Gillman Allen Jackson, CMG, OBE	20 February 1962	Appointed on the occasion of the Queen's visit to Ghana
Sir Paul Copeland Maltby, KBE, CB, DSO, AFC	16 March 1962	Serjeant-at-Arms, House of Lords
Dorothy May Vaisey, OBE	2 June 1962	General Secretary, Friends of the Poor and Gentlefolk's Help
Walter Arthur George Burns, CB, DSO, OBE, MC	2 June 1962	General Officer Commanding, London District
Martin Michael Charles Charteris, CB, MVO, OBE	2 June 1962	Assistant Private Secretary to the Queen
Sir John Walter Cordingley, KCB, CBE	2 June 1962	Controller of the RAF Benevolent Fund
Ivor Thomas Percival Hughes, CB, CBE, DSO, MC	2 June 1962	Serjeant-at-Arms attending the Speaker
Patrick Graham Toler Kingsley, CVO	2 June 1962	Secretary and Keeper of the Records, Duchy of Cornwall
Humphrey Clifford Lloyd, CVO, MC	2 June 1962	Gentleman Usher to the Queen
Sir Kenneth Phipson Maddocks, KCMG	3 February 1963	Governor and Commander in Chief of Fiji, appointed on the occasion of the Queen's visit to Fiji
Frank Leon Aroho Götz	18 February 1963	Minister for Internal Affairs of New Zealand, appointed on the occasion of the Queen's visit to New Zealand
Sir Edric Montague Bastyan, KCMG, KBE, CB	21 February 1963	Governor of South Australia, appointed on the occasion of the Queen's visit to Australia
Sir Eric Winslow Woodward, KCMG, CB, CBE, DSO	4 March 1963	Governor of New South Wales, appointed on the occasion of the Queen's visit to Australia
Sir Roy Russell Dowling, KBE, CB, DSO	27 March 1963	Australian Secretary to the Queen, appointed on the occasion of the Queen's visit to Australia
Joseph Charles Cameron Henley, CB	27 March 1963	Flag Officer, Royal Yachts
Horace Geoffrey Norman, CB, CBE	8 June 1963	National Playing Fields Association
Henry George Rushbury, CVO, CBE	1 January 1964	Keeper of the Royal Academy of Arts
Reginald Narcissus Macdonald-Buchanan, CVO, MBE, MC	13 June 1964	King Edward VII's Hospital for Officers
John Nigel Loring, CVO	13 June 1964	Apothecary to the Royal Household and to the Household of Queen Elizabeth the Queen Mother
Derek Duncombe Steele-Perkins, CB, CVO	13 June 1964	Medical Officer on the Queen's Overseas Tours
Ronald Bodley-Scott	13 June 1964	Physician to the Queen
William Albemarle Fellowes, CVO	15 October 1964	Land Agent, Sandringham
William Godfrey Agnew, CVO	1 January 1965	Clerk in Ordinary of the Privy Council
The Rev. Maurice Frederic Foxell, CVO	1 January 1965	Sub-Dean of HM Chapels Royal and Deputy Clerk of the Closet to the Queen
Francis Galloway Leslie, CVO	1 January 1965	Physician in Ordinary to the Princess Royal
John Wriothesley Russell, CMG	8 February 1965	HM Ambassador to Ethiopia, appointed on the occasion of the Queen's visit to Ethiopia
Sir Ian Dixon Scott, KCMG, CIE	12 February 1965	HM Ambassador to Sudan, appointed on the occasion of the Queen's visit to Sudan
Richard Colville, CB, CVO, DSC	12 June 1965	Press Secretary, Private Secretary's Office
Geoffrey Hugh Eastwood, CVO, CBE	12 June 1965	Formerly Comptroller of The Princess Royal
Sir Edward Milner Holland, CBE, QC	12 June 1965	Attorney General to the Duchy of Lancaster
The Baron McCorquodale of Newton	12 June 1965	Chairman of the Management Committee, King Edward VII's Hospital Fund for London
Stuart Henry Paton, CBE	12 June 1965	General Secretary, King George's Fund for Sailors
Hon. Sir Humphrey Vicary Gibbs, KCMG, OBE	18 November 1965	Governor of Southern Rhodesia
The Very Rev. Eric Symes Abbott	1 January 1966	Dean of Westminster
Alan Cumbrae Rose McLeod, CVO	1 January 1966	Surgeon-Dentist to the Queen
Eustace John Blois Nelson, CB, DSO, MVO, OBE, MC	1 January 1966	General Officer Commanding, London District
Sir Richard Edmonds Luyt, KCMG, DCM	4 February 1966	Governor of British Guiana, appointed on the occasion of the Queen's visit to British Guiana
Sir John Montague Stow, KCMG	14 February 1966	Governor of Barbados, appointed on the occasion of the Queen's visit to Barbados
Kenneth Lachlan Mackintosh	11 June 1966	Secretary to the Lord Great Chamberlain
John Lovegrove Waldron, CVO	11 June 1966	Assistant Commissioner, Metropolitan Police
Anstice Rosa Gibbs, CBE	1 January 1967	Chief Commissioner, Girl Guides
Sir Allan Henry Shafto Adair, Bt, CB, CVO, DSO, MC	1 January 1967	Yeoman of the Guard
Hon. Donald Burnes Sangster	15 March 1967	Prime Minister of Jamaica
Edmund Hakewill-Smith, CB, CBE, MC	10 June 1967	Governor of the Military Knights of Windsor and Lieutenant Governor of Windsor Castle
John Valentine Meech, CVO	10 June 1967	Formerly Secretary for Internal Affairs, New Zealand
Lady Mary Rachel Pepys, CVO	1 January 1968	Lady-in-Waiting to Princess Marina, Duchess of Kent
Michael Babington Charles Hawkins, CVO, MBE	1 January 1968	Private Secretary and Equerry to the Duke of Gloucester
The Rt Rev. Edward Michael Gresford-Jones	1 January 1968	Lord High Almoner
Cecil Charles Boyd-Rochfort, CVO	1 January 1968	Trainer of the Queen's Racehorses
Sir George Phillips Coldstream, KCB, QC	26 March 1968	Clerk of the Crown in Chancery and Permanent Secretary to the Lord Chancellor
Christopher Douglas Bonham-Carter, CB, CVO	8 June 1968	Treasurer to the Duke of Edinburgh
Cyril Harry Colquhoun, CB, CVO, OBE	8 June 1968	Secretary, Central Chancery of Orders of Knighthood and Registrar of the Royal Victorian Order
The Baron Cornwallis, KBE, MC	8 June 1968	Lord Lieutenant, Kent
David Dawnay, CB, DSO	8 June 1968	Secretary, Ascot Authority, and Clerk of the Course
Basil Oscar Paul Eugster, CB, CBE, DSO, MC	8 June 1968	General Officer Commanding, London District
Jack Alexander Sutherland-Harris, CB	8 June 1968	Second Crown Estate Commissioner
Hon. Francis Michael Legh, CVO	8 June 1968	Private Secretary and Treasurer to Princess Margaret, Countess of Snowdon
Murray Tyrrell, CVO, CBE	8 June 1968	Official Secretary to the Governor-General of Australia, appointed on the occasion of the Queen's visit to Australia
Albert James Galpin, CBE, MVO	29 October 1968	Secretary, Lord Chamberlain's Office
Frederick Cecil Mason, CMG	17 November 1968	HM Ambassador in Santiago, appointed on the occasion of the Queen's visit to Chile
The Duchess of Abercorn	1 January 1969	Mistress of the Robes to Queen Elizabeth the Queen Mother
Sir Arthur Edward Drummond Bliss	1 January 1969	Master of the Queen's Music
Henry Osmond Osmond-Clarke, CBE	1 January 1969	Orthopaedic Surgeon to the Queen
Francis Vivian Dunn, CVO, OBE	1 January 1969	For services as Director of Music, Royal Marines
John Mandeville Hugo, CVO, OBE	1 January 1969	Ceremonial and Protocol Secretary, Foreign and Commonwealth Office, and Gentleman Usher to the Queen
Sir Norman Samuel Joseph, CBE	1 January 1969	Director of J. Lyons and Company
Philip John Row, CVO, CBE	1 January 1969	Deputy Treasurer to the Queen
Sir Horace Anthony Claude Rumbold, Bt, KCMG, CB	10 May 1969	HM Ambassador to Austria, appointed on the occasion of the Queen's visit to Austria
James Monteith Grant	29 May 1969	Lord Lyon King of Arms
Lady Jean Marguerite Florence Rankin, CVO	14 June 1969	Lady-in-Waiting to Queen Elizabeth the Queen Mother
Alastair Campbell Blair, CVO, TD	14 June 1969	Purse Bearer to the Lord High Commissioner
The Earl Cairns, CB	14 June 1969	Marshal of the Diplomatic Corps
Goronwy Hopkin Daniel, CB	7 July 1969	On the occasion of the investiture of the Prince of Wales
William Jones Williams, OBE	7 July 1969	On the occasion of the investiture of the Prince of Wales
John Richard Pestell	9 July 1969	For services to the Governor of Southern Rhodesia
The Countess of Euston, CVO	1 January 1970	Mistress of the Robes to the Queen
Charles Abrahams	1 January 1970	Chairman, Friends of the Duke of Edinburgh's Award Scheme
Seymour John Louis Egerton	1 January 1970	Chairman, Coutts Bank
John Hastings James, CB	1 January 1970	Deputy Master and Comptroller, Royal Mint
Sir Joseph Thomas Molony, QC	1 January 1970	Attorney General to the Prince of Wales
The Earl of Westmorland	1 January 1970	Lord in Waiting
Sir Robert Sidney Foster, KCMG	5 March 1970	Governor of Fiji, appointed on the occasion of the Queen's state visit to Fiji
Sir Rohan Delacombe, KCMG, KBE, CB, DSO	8 April 1970	Governor of Victoria, appointed on the occasion of the Queen's state visit to Australia
Hon. Sir Alan James Mansfield, KCMG	14 April 1970	Governor of Queensland, appointed on the occasion of the Queen's state visit to Australia
Patrick John Morgan, CB, DSC	21 April 1970	Flag Officer, Royal Yachts
Sir Arthur Roden Cutler, VC, KCMG, CBE	3 May 1970	Governor of New South Wales, appointed on the occasion of the Queen's state visit to Australia
Sir Reginald George Pollard, KBE, CB, DSO	3 May 1970	Australian Secretary to the Queen, appointed on the occasion of the Queen's state visit to Australia
Alan Hunter Cachemaille Boxer, CB, DSO, DFC	13 June 1970	Defence Services Secretary
Allen John Bridson Goldsmith, CVO	13 June 1970	Surgeon-Oculist to the Royal Household
Lord Adam Granville Gordon, CVO, MBE	13 June 1970	Comptroller to Queen Elizabeth the Queen Mother
Sir David Lumden Webster	13 June 1970	General Administrator, Royal Opera House
Hon. Margaret Katherine Hay, CVO	1 January 1971	Woman of the Bedchamber to Queen Elizabeth the Queen Mother
The Very Rev. Robert Wilmer Woods	1 January 1971	Dean of Windsor
Hon. Olivia Vernon Mulholland, CVO	12 June 1971	Woman of the Bedchamber to the Queen
The Earl of Ancaster, TD	12 June 1971	Lord Lieutenant, County of London
Hon. Michael Fitzalan-Howard, CB, CBE, MVO, MC	12 June 1971	General Officer Commanding, London District
John Francis Hewitt, CBE	12 June 1971	Appointments Secretary to the Prime Minister and Ecclesiastical Secretary to the Lord Chancellor
Sir Roderick Francis Gisbert Sarell, KCMG	24 October 1971	HM Ambassador to Turkey, appointed on the occasion of the Queen's visit to Turkey
James Cecil Hogg, CVO	1 January 1972	Aurist to the Queen
Peter James Kerley, CVO, CBE	1 January 1972	Radiologist to the Queen
Alexander Henry Charles Gordon-Lennox, CB, DSO	1 January 1972	Serjeant-at-Arms, House of Commons
James Rennie Maudslay, CVO, MBE	1 January 1972	Keeper of the Privy Purse and Treasurer to the Queen
Douglas Sinclair Miller, CBE	1 January 1972	Secretary, King George's Jubilee Trust
Sir Arthur James de la Mare, KCMG	10 February 1972	HM Ambassador in Bangkok, appointed on the occasion of the Queen's visit to Thailand
Samuel Falle, CMG, DSC	18 February 1972	British High Commissioner in Singapore, appointed on the occasion of the Queen's visit to Singapore
Sir John Baines Johnston, KCMG	22 February 1972	British High Commissioner in Kuala Lumpur, appointed on the occasion of the Queen's visit to Malaysia
Angus Mackay MacKintosh, CMG	13 March 1972	HM Ambassador to the Maldives, appointed on the occasion of the Queen's visit to the Maldives
Sir Bruce Greatbatch, CMG, CVO, MBE	20 March 1972	Governor of the Seychelles, appointed on the occasion of the Queen's visit to the Seychelles
Geoffrey Paul Hardy-Roberts, CB, CBE	3 June 1972	Master of the Household
Eric Charles William Mackenzie Penn, CVO, OBE, MC	3 June 1972	Comptroller, Lord Chamberlain's Office
Dugald Leslie Lorn Stewart, CMG	17 October 1972	HM Ambassador in Belgrade, appointed on the occasion of the Queen's visit to Yugoslavia
Chandos Blair, OBE, MC	25 October 1972	Defence Services Secretary
Alexander Lees Mayall, CMG, CVO	1 December 1972	Vice-Marshal of the Diplomatic Corps
Lady Rose Gwendolen Louisa Baring, CVO	19 December 1972	Lady of the Bedchamber to the Queen
Sir Robert Eric Sherlock Gooch, Bt, DSO	1 January 1973	Lieutenant, Gentlemen-at-Arms
Francis John Bagott Watson, CVO	1 January 1973	Surveyor, Queen's Works of Art
Oliver Nicholas Millar, CVO	2 June 1973	Surveyor, Queen's Pictures
The Rt Rev. Robert Wright Stopford, CBE	2 June 1973	Bishop of London and Dean of the Chapels Royal
Albert Edward Perkins, CVO	7 July 1973	Personal Police Officer to the Queen
Elizabeth Mary Coke, Countess of Leicester, CVO	4 September 1973	Chief Commissioner, Girl Guides
Francis James Cecil Bowes-Lyon, CB, OBE, MC	26 October 1973	General Officer Commanding, London District
Arthur George Linfield, CVO, CBE	1 January 1974	Gardens consultant, for personal services.
Sir Ivison Stevenson Macadam, CVO, CBE	1 January 1974	Vice-Chairman, Council of King George's Jubilee Trust
The Baron Plunket, CVO	1 January 1974	Equerry to the Queen and Deputy Master of the Household
William Thomas Charles Skyrme, CB, CBE, TD, JP	1 January 1974	Secretary of Commissions, Lord Chancellor's Office
Patrick Jerad O'Dea, CVO	8 February 1974	Secretary for Internal Affairs in New Zealand, appointed on the occasion of the Queen's visit to New Zealand
Willis Ide Combs, CMG	22 March 1974	HM Ambassador to Indonesia, appointed on the occasion of the Queen's visit to Indonesia
John Mansel Miller, CVO, DSO, MC	15 June 1974	Crown Equerry
Charles Lorz Strong, MVO	15 June 1974	Physiotherapist, for personal services
The Rt Rev. Roger Plumpton Wilson	15 June 1974	Clerk of the Closet
Sir Reginald Francis Stewart Denning, KBE, CB	1 January 1975	Chairman, Soldiers', Sailors' and Airmen's Association
Philip Stuart Milner-Barry, CB, OBE	1 January 1975	Ceremonial Officer, Civil Service Department
Ralph Southward	1 January 1975	Apothecary to the Queen
Edward George Tuckwell	1 January 1975	Serjeant Surgeon to the Queen
Sir Edwin Hartley Cameron Leather, KCMG	16 February 1975	Governor of Bermuda, appointed on the occasion of the Queen's visit to Bermuda
John Edgar Galsworthy, CMG	24 February 1975	HM Ambassador in Mexico City, appointed on the occasion of the Queen's visit to Mexico
Sir Crawford Murray MacLehose, KCMG, MBE	4 May 1975	Governor of Hong Kong, appointed on the occasion of the Queen's visit to Hong Kong
Andrew Hunter Carnwath	14 June 1975	Treasurer, King Edward VII's Hospital Fund for London
John Pendrill Charles, MC	14 June 1975	For personal services to the Royal Family
Ronald Stephen Forrest	14 June 1975	Defence Services Secretary
James Starritt, CVO	14 June 1975	Deputy Commissioner, Metropolitan Police
Robert Christopher Mackworth Mackworth-Young, CVO	14 June 1975	Librarian and Assistant Keeper, The Queen's Archives
Richard John Trowbridge	31 July 1975	Flag Officer, Royal Yachts
John Noel Ormiston Curle, CMG, CVO	12 December 1975	Vice-Marshal of the Diplomatic Corps
John Derek Hornung, OBE, MC	1 January 1976	Lieutenant, Yeoman of the Guard
The Baron Luke of Pavenham, TD	1 January 1976	Chairman, National Playing Fields Association
James Eric Cable, CMG	28 May 1976	HM Ambassador in Helsinki, appointed on the occasion of the Queen's state visit to Finland
Sir Ralph Hugo Anstruther, Bt, CVO, MC	12 June 1976	Treasurer and Equerry to Queen Elizabeth the Queen Mother
The Rt Rev. William Launcelot Scott Fleming	12 June 1976	Dean of Windsor
Wilfred William Hill Hill-Wood, CBE	12 June 1976	For personal services
Philip Brian Cecil Moore, CB, CMG	12 June 1976	Deputy Private Secretary to the Queen
John Oscar Moreton, CMG, MC	11 July 1976	Minister at HM Embassy in Washington, appointed on the occasion of the Queen's visit to the United States of America
Philip John Newling Ward, CBE	27 October 1976	The Royal Visit Director, Silver Jubilee Visit to Tasmania
Anthony Arthur Acland, CMG	10 November 1976	HM Ambassador in Luxembourg, appointed on the occasion of the Queen's visit to Luxembourg
Ann Parker Bowles, CBE	31 December 1976	Chief Commissioner, Girl Guides
Norman Bishop Hartnell, MVO	31 December 1976	Fashion designer, appointed for professional services to the Queen
The Baron Hayter, CBE	31 December 1976	Chairman, Management Committee, King Edward VII's Hospital Fund for London
James Henry Scholtens, CVO	7 March 1977	Commonwealth Visit Director, Silver Jubilee Visit to Australia
Sir Colin Thomas Hannah, KCMG, KBE, CB	9 March 1977	Governor of Queensland, appointed on the occasion of the Queen's visit to Australia to mark her Silver Jubilee
Sir Stanley Charles Burbury, KBE	14 March 1977	Governor of Tasmania, appointed on the occasion of the Queen's visit to Australia to mark her Silver Jubilee
Hon. Sir Henry Arthur Winneke, AC, KCMG, KCVO, OBE, QC	16 March 1977	Governor of Victoria, appointed on the occasion of the Queen's visit to Australia to mark her Silver Jubilee
Sir Douglas Ralph Nicholls, OBE	20 March 1977	Governor of South Australia, appointed on the occasion of the Queen's visit to Australia to mark her Silver Jubilee
Sir Soong Chung Yocklunn	23 March 1977	Director of Royal Visit, Silver Jubilee Visit to Papua New Guinea
Sir Wallace Hart Kyle, GCB, CBE, DSO, DFC	26 March 1977	Governor of Western Australia, appointed on the occasion of the Queen's visit to Australia to mark her Silver Jubilee
The Viscount Ashbrook, MBE	5 May 1977	On retirement from the Council of the Duchy of Lancaster
Walter Edward Avenon Bull, CVO	5 May 1977	On retirement from the Council of the Duchy of Lancaster
The Baron Clitheroe, PC	5 May 1977	On retirement from the Council of the Duchy of Lancaster
Lady Abel Smith, CVO	11 June 1977	Woman of the Bedchamber to the Queen
Richard Philip Cave, CB, MVO	11 June 1977	Secretary, Association of Lieutenants of Counties
Colin Philip Joseph Woods, CBE	11 June 1977	Deputy Commissioner, Metropolitan Police
Gerald Christopher Cash, OBE	20 October 1977	Acting Governor General of the Bahamas, appointed on the occasion of the Queen's visit to the Bahamas to mark her Silver Jubilee
Sir Wilfred Ebenezer Jacobs, OBE, QC	28 October 1977	Governor of Antigua, appointed on the occasion of the Queen's visit to Antigua to mark her Silver Jubilee
Richard Ian Samuel Bayliss	31 December 1977	Physician to the Queen and Head of the Medical Household
Henry Ernest Marking, CBE, MC	31 December 1977	Deputy Chairman and Managing Director, British Airways
The Earl of Stair, CVO, MBE	31 December 1977	Captain-General, Royal Company of Archers
Sir Frank Roddam Twiss, KCB, DSC	31 December 1977	Gentleman Usher of the Black Rod and Serjeant-at-Arms attending the Lord Chancellor
