= Arthur Penn (disambiguation) =

Arthur Penn (1922 - 2010) was an American film and theatre director.

Arthur Penn may also refer to:

- Arthur Horace Penn (1886–1960), a member of the British Royal Household
- Arthur Penn, a character from the TV series Gotham
