= Lord Adam Gordon =

British royal courtier

Major Lord Adam Granville Gordon KCVO MBE (1 March 1909 – 5 July 1984) was a British royal courtier.

Gordon was the second son of Lt.-Col. Granville Cecil Douglas Gordon (1883–1930), who was later an equerry to the Duke of Connaught, and Violet Ida Streatfeild. His grandfather was Lord Granville Armyne Gordon (1856–1907), sixth son of the 10th Marquess of Huntly.

He was educated at Sandroyd School where he was Terence Rattigan's Scout leader. He then went on to Eton and joined the territorial division of the Royal Artillery in 1927, rising to the rank of Major and fought in World War II (where he was mentioned in despatches and afterwards awarded the MBE). In 1937, his elder brother, Douglas, inherited their great-uncle's title of Marquess of Huntly, and Adam and his younger brothers were granted the rank of a marquess's younger sons, enabling him to use the prefix Lord.

In 1953, Lord Adam succeeded Gp. Capt. Peter Townsend as Comptroller and Assistant Private Secretary to the Queen Mother, a post he held until his retirement in 1974. He was knighted in 1960 and died in 1984.

In 1947, he married Pamela, daughter of Alexander Herriot Bowhill of Inchmarlo CBE. They had two sons, Adam Alexander (born 1948) and Douglas Herriot (born 1951), Page of Honour to Queen Elizabeth II, 1965–67.

Court offices
Preceded by Gp. Capt. Peter Townsend	Comptroller to Queen Elizabeth the Queen Mother; 1953–1974	Succeeded by Capt. Alastair Aird
