= St Michael's Church, Chester Square =

Church of St Michael, Chester Square
- St. Michael with St. Philip, Chester Square
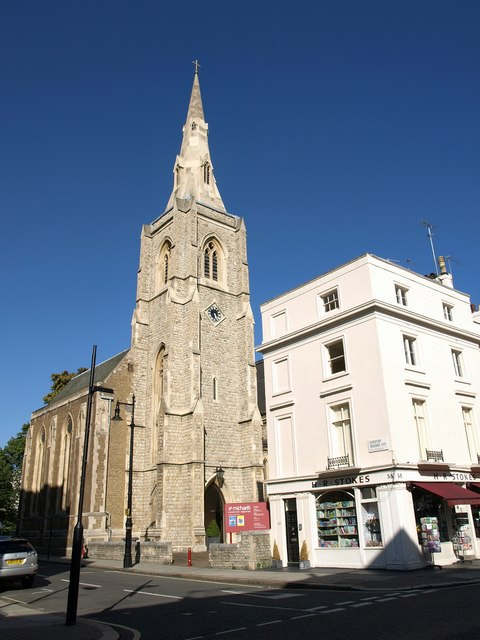
- St Michael's in July 2009
- Church of St Michael, Chester Square
- 51°29′39″N 0°09′04″W
- Location: Chester Square, Belgravia, London, SW1W 9EF
- Country: England
- Denomination: Church of England

History
- Status: Active

Architecture
- Functional status: Parish church
- Heritage designation: Grade II listed
- Architect: Thomas Cundy
- Years built: 1844

Administration
- Diocese: Diocese of London
- Archdeaconry: Archdeaconry of Charing Cross
- Deanery: Westminster (St Margaret) Deanery
- Parish: St. Michael's

The Church of St Michael is a Church of England parish church on Chester Square in the Belgravia district of West London. It has been listed Grade II on the National Heritage List for England since February 1958.

== Design ==
It was built in 1844 at the time of the construction of the rest of the square, and consecrated two years later. The church is in the late Decorated Gothic style, with an exterior of Kentish Ragstone. The architect was Thomas Cundy the younger.

The War Memorial Chapel at the north east end of the church was designed by Giles Gilbert Scott and completed in 1920. It was dedicated on 22 June 1922 in a ceremony attended by the Bishop of London, Arthur Winnington-Ingram. Wooden panels on the wall of the chapel contain 86 names of parishioners killed in World War I. The stained glass West Window is by Hugh Easton and two windows to the south are by Morris & Co and date to 1882.The Ecclesiologist magazine criticised the opening, saying it was "an attempt – but happily a most unsuccessful one – to find a Protestant development of the Christian styles".

== History ==
Arthur Sullivan served as organist at the church in the early 1860s. He was succeeded in 1867 by Franklin Taylor. T. J. Crawford was appointed organist in 1902.

W. H. Elliott was appointed Vicar of St Michael's in 1930. In 1931 he began a series of broadcast sermons from the church which lasted for the next eight years. Congregations of 500 people would attend the broadcast Thursday evening services, with a further 2,000 attending on the following Sunday. King George V and Queen Mary were regular listeners. An appeal for a fictitious poverty stricken child nicknamed 'Sally in our Alley' attracted 212,000 gifts from listeners and a prayer appeal in 1936 resulted in 5.5 million signed prayer cards.

Benjamin Britten attended an evening service at which he heard Elliott preach on 2 July 1933.

The Nigerian bass singer Christopher Oyesiku performed at St Michael's in the 1950s. Margaret and Denis Thatcher attended St Michael's briefly while living in Chester Square but ultimately became congregants at the chapel of the Royal Hospital Chelsea as they found St Michael's too "happy clappy".

=== St. Michael's House ===
St. Michael's House, at 2 Elizabeth Street, in nearby Victoria was built as a 'clubhouse' for St Michael's in the 1930s under the stewardship of the incumbent Vicar, W. H. Elliott. It was designed by Nugent Cachemaille-Day. The building served as an informal space for various children's activities and as a working men's club.
