= William Windham (rower) =

British rower (1926–2021)

Personal information
- Born: 2 April 1926 Biggleswade, Bedfordshire
- Died: 5 January 2021 (aged 94)

Sport
- Sport: Rowing
- Club: Leander Club
Medal record
Men's rowing
Representing England
British Empire Games
Bronze medal – third place	1950 Auckland	Eights
Representing the United Kingdom
European Rowing Championships
Bronze medal – third place	1950 Milan	Eight
Gold medal – first place	1951 Mâcon	Eight

William Ashe Dymoke Windham (2 April 1926 – 5 January 2021) was a British rower who competed for Great Britain in the 1952 Summer Olympics.

== Biography ==
Born in Biggleswade, Bedfordshire, on 2 April 1926, Windham was educated at Bedford School and Christ's College, Cambridge. In 1947 and 1951 he was a member of the winning Cambridge boat in the Boat Race.

He represented the English team at the 1950 British Empire Games in Auckland, New Zealand, where he won the bronze medal in the eights event.

He rowed for Great Britain in the European Rowing Championships in 1950 and 1951, winning a bronze medal in 1950 and a gold medal in 1951, and for Great Britain at the 1952 Summer Olympics.

He was elected as a Steward of the Henley Royal Regatta in 1953, was a member of the Committee of Management of the Henley Royal Regatta between 1972 and 1994, and was High Sheriff of Powys between 1996 and 1997. His son is the royal courtier Ashe Windham.

He died on 5 January 2021 at the age of 94.

== See also ==
- List of Cambridge University Boat Race crews
