= Chester Square =

Residential garden square in London, England

Coordinates: 51°29′43″N 0°8′59″W

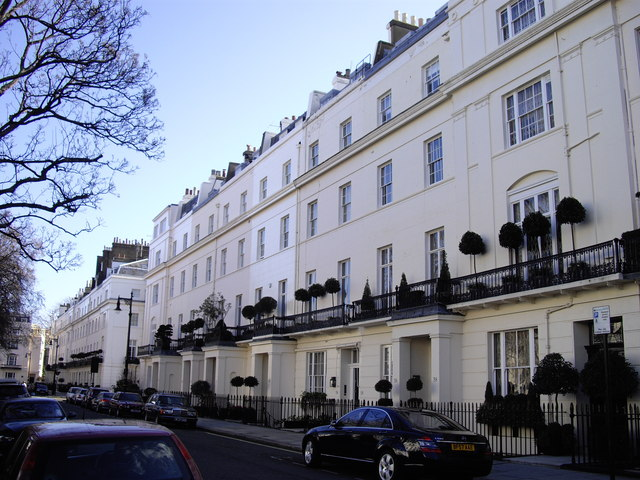
Chester Square

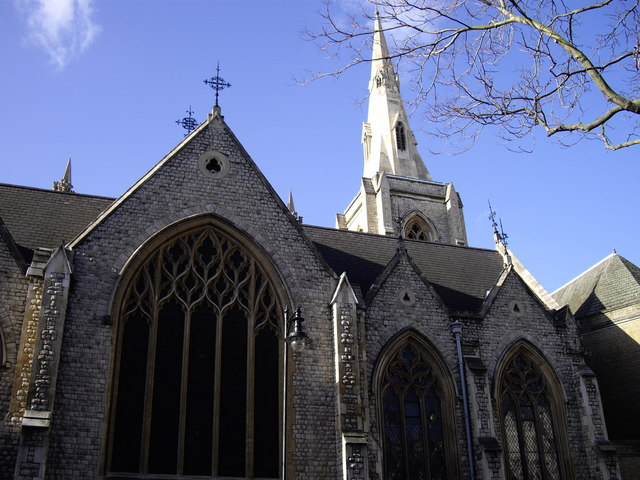
St Michael's Church, Chester Square

Chester Square is an elongated residential garden square (Note: 840 feet by 150 feet plus three short approach ways, one of which has extreme numbers 82 to 88 opposing 80a to 81a. The landmark square including roads thus measures 2.89 acres (building to building), of which the green area is 1.25 acres less bisecting Eccleston Street (0.07 between the greens).) in London's Belgravia district. It was developed by the Grosvenor family, as were the nearby Belgrave and Eaton Square. The square is named after the city of Chester, the city nearest the Grosvenors' ancestral home of Eaton Hall.

No.32 was used as a backdrop for video accompanying Morrissey's track "Suedehead".

The whole except No.s 80a, 81, 81a, 82, 83 and 83a (so No.s 1–13 and 14–23, 24–32, 37–39, 42–45, 45a, 45b, 65–76 and 77–80, 80a, and 84–88 and the Mews Arch) is listed Grade II for architectural merit.

The (private, communal) gardens are Grade II listed on the Register of Historic Parks and Gardens.

== St Michael's Church ==
The Anglican church of Saint Michael in Chester Square was built in 1844 along with the rest of the square, and consecrated two years later. The Ecclesiologist magazine criticised the opening, saying it was "an attempt - but happily a most unsuccessful one - to find a Protestant development of the Christian styles". The church is in the late Decorated Gothic style, with an exterior of Kentish Ragstone. The architect was Thomas Cundy the younger.

== Notable residents ==
- Roman Abramovich, Russian oligarch and former owner of Chelsea FC
- Matthew Arnold, poet and critic
- Tony Curtis, actor, had a house here when he was filming The Persuaders! in the early 1970s.
- Blake Edwards and Julie Andrews, film director and his actress wife, lived here for a few years in the early 1970s after their departure from Hollywood
- George II, King of the Hellenes, bought a lease on a house at No. 45 shortly before his return to Greece in 1946
- Mick Jagger and Marianne Faithfull, pop musicians, lived here in 1966-67
- Nigella Lawson, celebrity chef and food writer; daughter of Conservative former Cabinet Minister Nigel Lawson
- Sir John Liddell, doctor and director-general of the Royal Navy medical department, lived at No. 72 until his death in 1868
- Yehudi Menuhin, Baron Menuhin, American-born violinist and conductor
- Edward Ford, private secretary to Queen Elizabeth II, lived at No. 16 during the 1950s
- Margaret Thatcher, former British Conservative Prime Minister, lived at No. 73 until shortly before her death in 2013
- Wilhelmina, Queen of the Netherlands, had her headquarters at No. 77 during the Second World War
- Major Conrad Norman, Senior Gunnery Officer Royal Artillery Woolwich, Dunkirk survivor, officer in charge of British coastal gun emplacements in the Second World War, lived at No. 56 from 1946 until 1951
- Gideon Mantell, an obstetrician, geologist, and palaeontologist, whose attempts to reconstruct the structure and life of the Iguanodon began the scientific discovery of dinosaurs, lived until his death at No. 19.
- Tony Fernandes, Malaysian businessman and founder of Tune Group and former owner of Queens Park Rangers FC
- Rev. Can. W H Elliott, a broadcaster on religious matters for the BBC, and known as "the Radio Chaplain", was vicar of St Michael's in the mid-20th century.

== Footnotes and References ==
Footnotes

Citations
