= Alastair Aird =

British royal courtier

Sir Sir Alastair Aird

Private Secretary to The Queen Mother
- In office 1993–2002
- Monarch: Elizabeth II
- Preceded by: Sir Martin Gilliat

Comptroller to The Queen Mother
- In office 1974–2002

Extra Equerry to Elizabeth II
- In office 2003–2009

Bencher of the Middle Temple
- In office 1991–2009

Personal details
- Born: 14 January 1931 London, England
- Died: 30 September 2009 (aged 78) Dorset, England
- Occupation: Courtier
- Awards: Knight Grand Cross of the Royal Victorian Order (GCVO)

Military service
- Allegiance: United Kingdom
- Branch/service: British Army
- Rank: Captain

Captain Sir Alastair Sturgis Aird GCVO (14 January 1931 – 30 September 2009) was a British royal courtier.

== Biography ==
Aird was the second son of Colonel Malcolm Henry Aird O.B.E. (1899–1965), of the 9th Lancers, who, as son of Malcolm Rucker Aird, was a grandson of Sir John Aird, 1st Baronet, and his wife Joan Meredith, née Sturgis. He was educated at Lockers Park School in Hertfordshire, Eton and the Royal Military Academy Sandhurst before joining The 9th Queen's Royal Lancers in 1951.

From 1960 to 1964, he was a Temporary Equerry to the Queen Elizabeth the Queen Mother and then her Assistant Private Secretary and Extra Equerry from 1964 to 1973, Comptroller from 1974 to 2002 and Private Secretary and Equerry from 1993 to 2002. After the Queen Mother's death in 2002, Sir Alastair was made an Extra Equerry to Queen Elizabeth II in 2003.

On 22 July 1963, he married Fiona Violet, Lady Aird (née Myddelton) LVO, who was an Extra Lady-in-Waiting to Princess Margaret from 1960 to 2002. The couple lived in Dorset and had two daughters. The elder, Caroline, is a god-child of Princess Margaret.

== Honours ==
- He was appointed as a Member (4th Class) of the Royal Victorian Order (MVO) in the 1969 Queen's Birthday Honours List.
- He was upgraded to Commander of the Royal Victorian Order (CVO) in the 1977 New Years Honours List.
- He received the UK Version of the Queen Elizabeth II Silver Jubilee Medal in 1977.
- He was upgraded to Knight Commander of the Royal Victorian Order (KCVO) in the 1984 Queen's Birthday Honours List. This allowed him to be called "Sir Alastair Aird".
- He was upgraded to Knight Grand Cross of the Royal Victorian Order (GCVO) in the 1997 New Years Honours List.
- He received the UK Version of the Queen Elizabeth II Golden Jubilee Medal in 2002.
