= Daniel Davies (physician, born 1899) =

Welsh physician

Sir Daniel Thomas Davies KCVO (November 1899 – 19 May 1966) was a Welsh physician.

His parents lived in the Garw Valley area, and he attended Bridgend Grammar School. He later studied at University College Cardiff. In 1927 he was appointed pathologist of Middlesex Hospital, London, before, in 1930, joining the clinical staff at the Royal Free Hospital. He also worked at the Hospital of St John and St Elizabeth, St John's Wood from 1930 to 1965.

From 1938 onwards, he was physician to the royal family, firstly to King George VI, and later to both Queen Elizabeth and the Duke of Windsor; he received a knighthood in the 1951 New Year Honours. In 1953 he was created a Knight Commander of the Order of St. Sylvester by Pope Pius XII.

His published works include several medical books, including a well-regarded work on pneumonia and books on anaemia and peptic ulcers. Together with Lord Dawson, Graham Hodgson, Lionel Whitby and others he undertook important research work on the treatment of pneumonia with the use of Felton's serum.

He died at his home in Wimpole Street, London in May 1966.
