= Oliver Dawnay =

British civil servant, banker and private secretary (1920-1988)

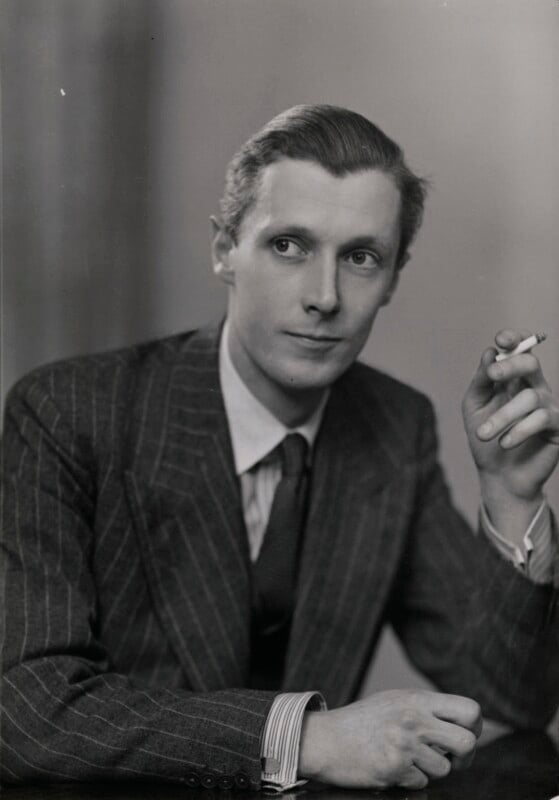
Dawnay in 1951

Oliver Payan Dawnay CVO (4 April 1920 – 18 March 1988) was a British civil servant, banker, stockbroker, and private secretary to Queen Elizabeth the Queen Mother from 1951 to 1956. Dawnay served with the army in World War II, and worked as a banker before and after his royal service.

== Early life and army service ==
Dawnay was the son of Major-General Guy Dawnay, and attended Eton College and Balliol College, Oxford, before working as a civil servant in the Ministry of Economic Warfare. At the outbreak of World War II Dawnay joined the army and served as an adjutant with the 1st Battalion of the Coldstream Guards and the Guards Armoured Division; seeing action on D-Day in 1944. Dawnay was also mentioned in dispatches during the war. At the end of the war Dawnay joined the Foreign Office Conference Department, and worked as a merchant banker with Dawnay Day after leaving the army.

== Private Secretary to the Queen Mother ==
In February 1951 Dawnay was appointed private secretary to Queen Elizabeth, wife of King George VI. Dawnay succeeded T. C. Harvey as private secretary to the Queen. As private secretary to the Queen, Dawnay also oversaw the affairs of the Queen's daughter, Princess Margaret. Dawnay was involved in the discussions over Margaret's proposed marriage to Peter Townsend. In his role as the Queen's private secretary Dawnay communicated the Queen's concerns over a proposed biography of George VI to the book's author, John Pudney. Dawnay objected to the depiction of George's ill health, writing that 'I can tell you that up to the last year of his life, many young visitors, half his age, to his estates have been practically walked off their legs by their Sovereign!".

In July 1951, in an incident that was published in international newspapers, Dawnay rescued a woman and her three children from a car that had crashed into the River Blackwater near his home in Reading, Berkshire. The driver of the car was killed in the crash, with an eyewitness describing Dawnay's actions as having "undoubtedly saved the children's lives".

== Post royal service ==
Dawnay resumed his banking career in 1956, leaving the Queen Mother's service, and was succeeded as her private secretary in 1956 by Martin Gilliat. Gilliat would serve as the Queen Mother's private secretary for 37 years until his death in 1993.

Dawnay was a partner of the stockbroking firm Grieveson, Grant & Co. from 1961 to 1980, and remained friends with the Queen Mother for many years after he left her service. In 1963, Dawnay married as his second wife Iris Peake, a former lady-in-waiting to Princess Margaret.
