= Ashe Windham (equerry) =

British royal courtier

Ashe George Russell Windham CVO (born 11 July 1957) is a British royal courtier. He is a trustee of The King's Foundation. He was Chairman of The Castle of Mey Trust from 1996 to 2018.

The son of William Windham, he was educated at Eton College and the Royal Military Academy Sandhurst. He has been President of The Old Etonian Association since 2021. He gained the rank of Captain in the Irish Guards. Ashe joined Barclays de Zoete Wedd in 1987 as an institutional equities salesman and was appointed a Director of BZW's Equities Division in 1991. He joined Credit Suisse First Boston in 1997 when they acquired BZW's equities business. In 2004 he joined Man Investments as Head of Internal Communications and in 2007 became Man Group's Global Head of Internal Communications. In June 2009 he resigned from Man Group to set up a private family office, which he continues to run. He is Chairman of Miton UK MicroCap Trust plc.

He was Temporary Equerry to Queen Elizabeth the Queen Mother between 1980 and 1982. He held the office of Extra Equerry to The Queen Mother until 2002. He held the office of Extra Equerry to Charles III twice, once in 2003 (as Prince of Wales) and later as King in 2023.

He was made a Member of the Royal Victorian Order in the 1982 Birthday Honours, and Commander in 2000, having also held the rank of Lieutenant.
