= Basil Vernon Brooke =

Royal Navy rear-admiral

Rear-Admiral Sir Basil Vernon Brooke, GCVO (1876–1945) was an Anglo-Irish courtier and Royal Navy officer. He was Treasurer to Queen Elizabeth and a Groom in Waiting from 1937 to 1945.

== Naval career ==
Born on 9 March 1876, Brooke was the son of Arthur Basil Brooke, himself the third son of Sir Arthur Brooke, 2nd Baronet. He entered the Royal Navy as a cadet in 1890 and from 1892 served on HMS Blake. He was promoted to sub-lieutenant in 1895 and lieutenant in 1898. He served in China and North America before being posted to the Royal Yacht HMY Osbourne in 1903, where he remained for six years. During this period, he instructed the young princes (including Prince Albert, the future Duke of York who became king as George VI) on their first lessons in seamanship. In 1909, he was promoted to commander. He subsequently served in China and from 1913 to 1914 was flag-commander to the Commander-in-Chief, Portsmouth.

During the First World War, Brooke served in the Grand Fleet and was promoted to captain in 1916. He commanded HMS Southampton from 1917 to 1919. He commanded HMY Alexandra from 1919 to 1922, when he retired and was appointed a Commander of the Royal Victorian Order. He was promoted to rear-admiral in retirement in 1927.

== Courtier ==
In 1923, Brooke was appointed Comptroller and Equerry to Prince Albert, by then the Duke of York, and was made a Knight Commander of the Royal Victorian Order in 1933. Shortly after the duke became king (as George VI) in 1936, he appointed Brooke to be Groom in Waiting and Extra Equerry to the King and Treasurer to Queen Elizabeth (all appointments dating from 1937). Brooke was promoted to Knight Grand Cross of the Royal Victorian Order in 1943. During the Second World War, he was commander of the Upper Thames Patrol. He died, still holding his royal offices, on 11 December 1945. The Daily Telegraph called him a "an old friend and devoted servant" to the King and Queen, and described him as a "tall and good-looking Irishman, with the added charm of the Navy ... with wide interests and possessed [of] a delightful personality".
