= W. H. Elliott =

Church of England clergyman (1884–1957)

Reverend Canon Wallace Harold Elliott
- Born: 1884
- Died: 1957 (aged 72–73)
- Other name: The Radio Chaplain
- Occupation: Church of England clergyman

The Reverend Canon Wallace Harold Elliott (1884–1957) was a Church of England clergyman and Precentor of the Chapels Royal, and a broadcaster on religious matters for the BBC, known as "the Radio Chaplain".

== Early life and education ==
Elliott was educated at Brasenose College, Oxford, where he was Colquitt Exhibitioner, and took a 2nd-class BA in Theology in 1906, being promoted to MA in 1910. He subsequently studied at Ripon College Cuddesdon, outside Oxford.

== Career ==
Being ordained deacon in 1907 and priest in 1908, Elliott was curate at Guisborough, North Yorkshire from 1907 to 1909, before being appointed Church of England Men's Society organizing secretary for the Northern Provinces. From 1909 he was also curate at Leeds. In 1918 he became vicar of Holy Trinity, Folkestone, "a carpeted and golden edifice built in 1868 for the West End of Folkestone", remaining there until 1928; from 1924 to 1928 he was also a prebendary of Canterbury Cathedral. His service as chaplain to the King began in 1926, and he was a canon of St Paul's Cathedral, London from 1928. From 1930 to 1941, Elliott was vicar of St Michael's church, Chester Square, in London's Belgravia district. Along with serving as Precentor of the Chapels Royal from 1941 to 1946, he was sub-dean from 1942 to 1948, when he retired. He was also Deputy Clerk of the Closet and Sub-Almoner to the King from 1941 to 1948, and Domestic Chaplain to the King from 1942 to 1948.

Alongside his broadcasting for the BBC, Elliott was also a writer. He appeared as a castaway on the BBC Radio programme Desert Island Discs on 26 March 1942. Elliott persuaded Plomley to let him write his own script which Plomley regretted as the script turned out to be a kind of sermon.

== Personal life ==
Elliott married Edith Plaistow Kilburn; their son was the theatre and television director Michael Elliott.
