= Arnold Stott =

British Army general and physician

Major-General Sir Arnold Stott KBE FRCP
- Stott in 1946
- Born: Arnold Walmsley Stott; 7 July 1885; Bardsley, Lancashire, England
- Died: 15 June 1958 (aged 72); Guildford, Surrey, England

Major-General Sir Arnold Walmsley Stott, KBE, FRCP (7 July 1885 – 15 June 1958) was a British physician, specialising in cardiovascular disease, and British Army officer.

== Military career ==
Stott was born on 7 July 1885 in Bardsley, Lancashire, England. He was educated at Rugby School, an all-boys public school. He studied at Trinity College, Cambridge and then trained in medicine at St Bartholomew's Hospital Medical College. He qualified Member of the Royal College of Physicians (MRCP) in 1912. He was an assistant to the noted cardiologist Sir Thomas Lewis, and worked in the pathology and children's departments of St Bartholomew's Hospital as a house physician.

During the First World War, he served as a pathologist with the Royal Army Medical Corps, seeing active service in France. He was commissioned into the British Army as a lieutenant on 5 September 1914. After the end of the war, in 1919, he joined the staff of Westminster Hospital and the Royal Chest Hospital.

On 18 September 1939, with the outbreak of the Second World War, Stott re-joined the British Army, and was granted the substantive rank of lieutenant and the acting rank of colonel. He served as a consulting physician to the British Expeditionary Force from 1939 to 1940. He served in France until the Dunkirk evacuation, and then worked with the British Army and the Emergency Hospital Service in the Midlands. He was granted the local rank of brigadier on 1 March 1942 and the local rank of major general on 12 August 1942.

After the end of the war, he returned to Westminster Hospital as a consulting physician. He practised as a physician and taught medical students, in addition to acting as an administrator of the hospital in the run up to the creation of the National Health Service and during its early years. He retired in 1950, and that year became chairman of the British Cardiac Society.

In November 1948, King George VI appointed him an Extra Physician to the Household. With the succession of Elizabeth II to the throne in 1952, he was re-appointed to the role in her Household.

After a long illness, Stott died on 15 June 1958 at his home near Guildford, Surrey, England; he was 72 year old.

== Personal life ==
In 1911, Stott married Emily "Lily" Holland. Together they had two daughters and one son, the evangelist John Stott (1921–2011).

== Honours ==
For his service in the First World War, he was awarded the 1914–15 Star, the British War Medal and the Victory Medal. In the 1946 New Year Honours, he was appointed Knight Commander of the Order of the British Empire (KBE).
