= Hugh Wood (priest) =

Hugh Singleton Wood, KHC (1859–1941) was a Church of England priest and Royal Navy chaplain. He was the Chaplain of the Fleet and Archdeacon of the Royal Navy, serving from 1906 to 1917.

Wood was educated at The Queen's College, Oxford, matriculating in 1878 and graduating B.A. in 1882. and ordained in 1884. He began his ecclesiastical career with a curacy at Holy Trinity, Haverstock Hill. He then served with the Navy from 1886 to 1917. He was an Honorary Chaplain to the King from 1910 to 1936.

He died on 8 March 1941.
