= Frank Herbert Mitchell =

British civil servant (1878–1951)

Sir Frank Mitchell
Personal information
- Full name: Frank Herbert Mitchell
- Born: 13 June 1878; Eton, Buckinghamshire, England
- Died: 27 November 1951 (aged 73); Crowborough Warren, Sussex, England
- Batting: Right-handed
- Bowling: Right-arm underarm slow
- Relatives: Richard "Mike" Mitchell (father)

Domestic team information
- Years: Team
- 1897–1905: Buckinghamshire
- 1898: Oxford University

Career statistics
Competition	First-class
Matches	3
Runs scored	23
Batting average	5.75
100s/50s	0/0
Top score	9
Balls bowled	183
Wickets	5
Bowling average	22.80
5 wickets in innings	1
10 wickets in match	0
Best bowling	5/32
Catches/stumpings	0/–
- Source: Cricinfo, 11 May 2011

Sir Frank Herbert Mitchell KCVO CBE (13 June 1878 – 27 November 1951) was a British civil servant known as a private secretary and later Groom in Waiting to King George V. He was also a useful cricketer and golfer.

== Cricket ==
Mitchell was a right-handed batsman who bowled right-arm underarm slow. The younger son of first-class cricketer and Eton master Richard "Mike" Mitchell, he was born at Eton, Buckinghamshire and was educated at Eton College, where he represented the college cricket team. He was later educated at Balliol College, Oxford.

Mitchell debuted for Buckinghamshire in the 1897 Minor Counties Championship against Hertfordshire. He played Minor counties cricket for Buckinghamshire from 1897 to 1905, which included 7 Minor Counties Championship matches. Mitchell made his first-class debut for Oxford University against the Marylebone Cricket Club in 1898. He played 2 further first-class matches in that season, against Somerset and Surrey. In his 3 matches he scored 23 runs at a batting average of 5.75, with a high score of 9. With the ball he took 5 wickets at a bowling average of 22.80. These all came in a single innings against Somerset, with Mitchell taking 5/32.

== Golfer ==
Mitchell was a noted amateur golfer. He played golf for Oxford University against Cambridge University from 1898 to 1901 and also represented England in the England–Scotland Amateur Match in 1906, 1907 and 1908.

== Career ==
During the First World War, he served as assistant director of the Official Press Bureau of the Home Office. He was appointed a Commander of the Order of the British Empire in the 1918 New Year Honours.

He was to later serve as Assistant Private Secretary to King George V from 1931 to 1937. Knighted in 1937, Mitchell was subsequently appointed to the office of Groom in Waiting. He succeeded as the Secretary of the Most Noble Order of the Garter in 1933. He died at Crowborough Warren, Sussex on 27 November 1951.
