= Martin Gilliat =

British Army officer and courtier (1913–1993)

Lieutenant-Colonel Sir Martin John Gilliat GCVO MBE (8 February 1913 – 27 May 1993) was a British soldier and courtier who served as Private Secretary to Queen Elizabeth the Queen Mother for 37 years. Gilliat was a German prisoner of war in the Second World War, and was imprisoned in Colditz Castle.

== Early life ==
Gilliat was born in Hertfordshire, the son of local landowner Sir John Babington Gilliat and Muriel Grinnell-Milne. Gilliat's parents both came from banking families, his paternal grandfather was John Saunders Gilliat, Governor of the Bank of England from 1883 to 1885. Gilliat's childhood was divided between The Cedars in Chorleywood and Frogmore Hall, Hertfordshire, before moving to the Manor House in Welwyn. He attended Ludgrove School, Eton College and entered the King's Royal Rifle Corps in 1933 after graduating from the Royal Military College in Sandhurst.

== Army career ==
Gilliat served with the Rifle Corps in Northern Ireland and Palestine prior to the outbreak of World War II, and was captured during the Battle of Dunkirk as part of the British Expeditionary Force. He made several attempts to escape, with one attempt lasting several days, but was transferred to the prisoner-of-war camp Oflag IV-C (Colditz Castle) in 1940 where he remained until the end of the war. He was mentioned in dispatches and later rewarded with an MBE. After the war Gilliat served as Deputy Military Secretary to Louis Mountbatten, 1st Earl Mountbatten of Burma during his brief term as the last Viceroy of India in 1947–48, and as Comptroller to Malcolm MacDonald, the High Commissioner for South-East Asia. In September 1947, while in Mountbatten's service, Gilliat and the author Alan Campbell-Johnson were driving through the Paharganj district of Delhi when they were fired upon. The driver of their car was killed in the incident, and Gilliat suffered a substantial loss of blood, and a superficial head wound.

Gilliat was posted to Australia in 1953 to serve as Military Secretary to the Governor-General of Australia, Viscount Slim and in 1970 served as a pallbearer at Slim's funeral. Gilliat was appointed a Commander of the Royal Victorian Order in 1954 after his assistance during the Australian visit of Queen Elizabeth II and Prince Philip, Duke of Edinburgh during February 1954.

== Private Secretary to Queen Elizabeth the Queen Mother ==
After briefly serving as Assistant Private Secretary, Gilliat was chosen to replace Oliver Dawnay as Private Secretary to Queen Elizabeth the Queen Mother in 1956, and would hold the post until his death, 37 years later. Gilliat was succeeded as Assistant Private Secretary by Major Francis Legh.

Queen Elizabeth had been widowed for only three years when Gilliat entered her service at her London residence of Clarence House, his obituary in The Independent credited him with helping her carve out a new role for herself and described his attitude:

Like her, he took a genuine interest in the lives and doings of all with whom he came into contact and made them feel that they were important to him. He made no distinction between old and young, rich and poor, high and low, white and coloured. He thought the best of everyone – someone said of him, 'All Martin's geese are swans' – and treated them all alike.

Gilliat was an expert at 'breaking the ice' between nervous guests and the Queen at her parties. Gilliat once deployed his skills at a party for the young Bhumibol Adulyadej, the King of Thailand, by asking the king to demonstrate his skill of standing on his head, which the King did.

Gilliat and Queen Elizabeth were both passionate about steeplechasing, and he eventually owned horses of his own after encouraging the Queen in the purchase of hers. He invested in theatrical productions, and found success with the 1984 London revival of Me and My Girl.

== Death ==
Gilliat died on 27 May 1993, aged 80, after working for the Queen Mother for 37 years. He had been reluctant to leave her service, having worked for her for several months after his diagnosis of cancer despite his ailing health, and he remained in his post until three days before his death. The Queen Mother later described him as "One of the kindest of people. He was always helping somebody". The portrait painter Andrew Festing likened Gilliat and the Queen Mother's relationship to that of brother and sister, saying that the pair bickered good naturedly.

His funeral was held in the Chapel Royal, St James's Palace, and attended by the Queen Mother. Gilliat was succeeded as the Queen Mother’s private secretary by Alastair Aird. The British royal family later constructed a memorial cairn in the grounds of the Castle of Mey, the Queen Mother's Scottish home, for Gilliat and her friend and lady-in-waiting Ruth Roche, Baroness Fermoy who died in July 1993, a few weeks after Gilliat.

== Honours ==
Gilliat appointed a Deputy Lieutenant of his native county of Hertfordshire in 1971, and made an honorary Bencher of the Middle Temple in 1977. The Queen Mother awarded Gilliat an honorary LL.D. at the University of London in 1977.
