= Norman Gwatkin =

British Army officer (1899–1971)

Brigadier Sir Norman Gwatkin GCVO KCMG DSO
- Born: 2 August 1899
- Died: 31 July 1971 (aged 71)
- Military career
- Allegiance: United Kingdom
- Branch: British Army
- Service years: 1918–1959
- Rank: Brigadier
- Service number: 19152
- Unit: Coldstream Guards
- Commands: 5th Guards Armoured Brigade
- Conflicts: Second World War
- Awards: Knight Grand Cross of the Royal Victorian Order; Knight Commander of the Order of St Michael and St George; Distinguished Service Order; Mentioned in Dispatches

Brigadier Sir Norman Wilmshurst Gwatkin GCVO KCMG DSO (2 August 1899 – 31 July 1971) was a British Army officer and courtier in the Household of Elizabeth II.

== Military career ==
Gwatkin was the son of Hugh Fortescue Wilmshurst Gwatkin and Vera Philpots. He was educated at Clifton College before attending the Royal Military College, Sandhurst.

He commissioned into the Coldstream Guards in 1918. He subsequently joined the Royal Household. He was invested as a Member of the Royal Victorian Order in 1937, while serving as Assistant Comptroller of the Lord Chamberlain's Office. In 1940 he was promoted to the rank of Lieutenant-Colonel. Gwatkin saw active service in the Second World War and in 1944 he was awarded the Distinguished Service Order while commanding the 5th Guards Armoured Brigade in Operation Overlord. He returned to the Royal Household after the war. Between 1950 and 1952 he served as an Extra Equerry to George VI, and held the same role in the household of Elizabeth II until his death in 1971. From 1960 to 1964 he served as Comptroller, and in 1963 he was made Knight Grand Cross of the Royal Victorian Order. Gwatkin served as Secretary and Registrar of the Order of Merit between 1963 and his death. In 1964 he was made Knight Commander of the Order of St Michael and St George.

In 1957 he married Isolen Mary June Wilson in Aldershot.

While serving in the Lord Chamberlain's Office he was responsible for a report which described the 1962 play, Under Plain Cover, as "effluent".
