= Morton Smart =

Scottish manipulative surgeon (1877–1956)

Sir Morton Smart GCVO DSO
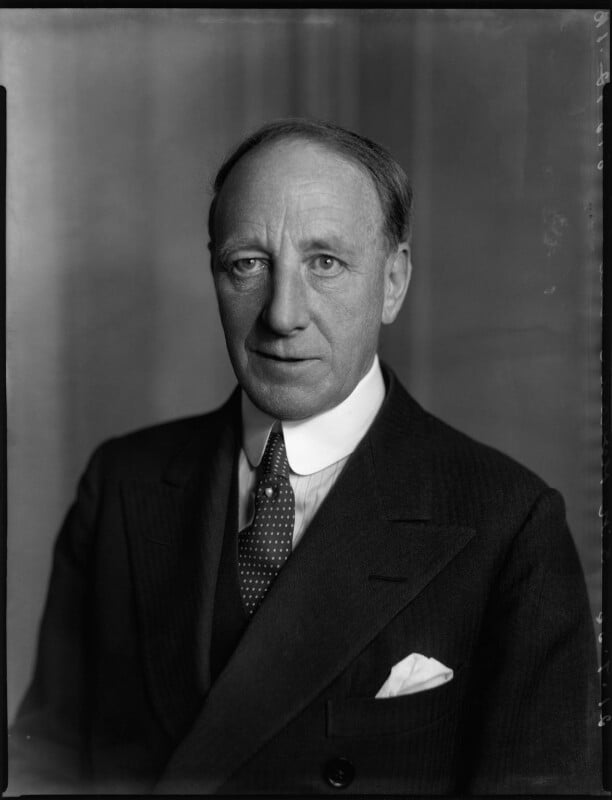
- Smart in 1936
- Born: 1 December 1877
- Died: 16 March 1956 (aged 78)
- Occupation: Physician
- Medical career
- Profession: Surgeon

Sir Morton Warrack Smart, GCVO, DSO (1 December 1877 – 16 March 1956) was a Scottish manipulative surgeon who served George V, Edward VIII, George VI and Elizabeth II.

== Early life and education ==
Smart was born in Edinburgh on 1 December 1877, the son of the painter John Smart and Agnes Purdie, née Main. He attended George Watson's College and the University of Edinburgh; he served in the South African War, before graduating with Bachelor of Medicine and Bachelor of Surgery degrees from Edinburgh in 1902.

== Career ==
Smart then moved to London, where he was given an appointment at Great Ormond Street Hospital (taking charge of the X-ray department). His interests shifted towards orthopedic medicine, particularly manipulative surgery, and he received a Doctor of Medicine degree from Edinburgh in 1912 for a thesis on faradism. With Walter Rowley Bristow, he invented the Smart–Rowley faradic coil. By the time the First World War broke out, he had established a large private practice. The Oxford Dictionary of National Biography describes him as "essentially" an "orthopedic physician".

In the lead up to the war, he had become involved in the British Motor Boat Club and served on an Admiralty committee concerning the use of motor boats in the event of a war. During the war, the First Lord of the Admiralty Winston Churchill had him appointed a Commander in the Royal Naval Volunteer Reserve. In 1914, he was appointed chief of staff to the admiral in command of gunboats in Belgian canals and was subsequently posted to the First Army in France. Service on a flotilla in the Dardanelles saw him awarded the Distinguished Service Order in 1917. He subsequently served in the Aegean and in the West Indies before demobilisation in 1919.

After the war, he returned to medicine. He was involved with the London Clinic for Injuries. He was employed as George V's manipulative surgeon and was appointed a Commander of the Royal Victorian Order in 1932; he also received decorations from Spain and Monaco recognising his service to their courts. In 1933, he was promoted to Knight Commander of the Royal Victorian Order. When Edward VIII succeeded to the throne in 1936, he appointed Smart to the new office of Manipulative Surgeon to the King, which he held during the reign of George VI, who he attended to during the king's illness in 1948, for which service Smart was promoted to Knight Grand Cross of the Royal Victorian Order in 1949 (the same year he was appointed Extra Manipulative Surgeon to the King, an appointment which was renewed under Elizabeth II from 1952). Meanwhile, he had been a consultant to the Royal Air Force during the Second War.

== Later life ==
A distinguished motorboater, yachtsman and horticulturalist, Smart died on 16 March 1956. He left a widow, Lilian Gladys, née Gibson, the daughter of a magistrate (she was the widow of Major P. Vaughan Lavarack, MC). He did not have any children of his own, but had a stepson, Commander T. V. Lavarack.
