= Edward Seymour (British Army officer) =

British Army officer and courtier

- Born: 10 February 1877
- Died: 28 February 1948 (aged 71)
- Allegiance: United Kingdom
- Branch: British Army
- Service years: 1896–1908; 1914–1923
- Rank: Major
- Conflicts: Mahdist War; Second Boer War; Somaliland Campaign; First World War
- Awards: Knight Commander of the Royal Victorian Order; Distinguished Service Order; Officer of the Order of the British Empire; Mentioned in Dispatches

Major Sir Edward Seymour, KCVO, DSO, OBE (10 February 1877 – 28 February 1948) was a British Army officer and courtier.

Seymour was the third son of Leopold Richard Seymour and Mary Hubbard Sturgis; his paternal grandfather was George Hamilton Seymour, a grandson of a Duke of Somerset of the Seymour family.

He commissioned into a Militia battalion of the East Surrey Regiment where he advanced to the rank of lieutenant, but transferred to the Grenadier Guards as a second lieutenant on 28 July 1897. He saw active service in the Nile Expedition in 1898 during the Mahdist War, and was promoted to lieutenant in the regiment on 15 February 1899. Serving in South Africa during the Second Boer War from 1900 to 1902; he took part in operations in the Orange Free State April to May 1900, and operations in the Orange River Colony in May 1900, including the action at Biddulphsberg that month, where he was wounded. Following the end of the war in June 1902, he returned with a large contingent of the guards regiments on board the SS Lake Michigan, which arrived in Southampton in October 1902, and returned to active service with a battalion of his regiment. In 1904 he was seconded for service on the Staff.

In 1908 Seymour left the army and became Comptroller in the household of Princess Helena of Waldeck and Pyrmont. He rejoined the regular army following the outbreak of the First World War and was re-granted a commission in the Grenadier Guards on 19 August 1914. During the war he was Mentioned in Dispatches and awarded the Distinguished Service Order.

In 1923 he was appointed as an equerry to Alexandra of Denmark, serving in the role until 1925. He was Comptroller to Princess Victoria of the United Kingdom between 1925 and 1935, and held the office of Extra Equerry to George V in 1935. Seymour was made a Knight Commander of the Royal Victorian Order in the 1934 New Year Honours. He then served as an Extra Equerry to Edward VIII in 1936 and to George VI from 1937 to his death in 1948.

In 1905 Seymour married Lady Blanche Frances Conyngham, daughter of Henry Conyngham, 4th Marquess Conyngham, with whom he had a son and a daughter.
