= Trevitt Hine-Haycock =

English cricketer and clergyman

The Reverend Trevitt Reginald Hine-Haycock MVO (3 December 1861 – 2 November 1953) was an English clergyman who served as Priest in Ordinary to the King from 1905 to 1931 and, briefly, to Queen Elizabeth II in the first years of her reign. He also played cricket as an amateur sportsman for Oxford University and Kent County Cricket Club from 1882 to 1886.

== Early life ==
Hine-Haycock was born in Old Charlton in what was then Kent in 1861. He was the second son of William Haylock, a solicitor. The family originally used the surname Haycock, adopting Hine-Haycock in 1878. He was educated at Wellington College, Berkshire and New College, Oxford, graduating with a law degree in 1885. He was captain of the cricket XI at school and he captained both the New College XI and the Oxford XI in 1883–84 and in 1884 he was the honorary secretary of the University Cricket Club.

== Career ==
Although he was educated as a barrister, being called to the bar at Lincoln's Inn in 1886, Hine-Haycock was ordained as a priest in 1890 becoming curate at Rotherham in the same year. In 1895 he became a minor canon of Westminster Abbey, and from 1902 to 1909 was Custodian of the Abbey and Precentor from 1902 to 1912. He was later appointed a vicar of Christ Church Greyfriars and rector of St Leonard, Foster Lane, both in the City of London, posts he would hold for 40 years.

Hine-Haycock served in the Ecclesiastical Household as a Priest-in-Ordinary from 1905. He was appointed as senior Priest-in-Ordinary for Elizabeth II in 1952.

== Cricket ==
Having played for his school and, from 1880, for Devon County Cricket Club in minor matches, Hine-Haycock made his first-class cricket debut in 1882 for Oxford University against Marylebone Cricket Club (MCC) at The University Parks. He played regular first-class cricket as an opening batsman between 1882 and 1886, winning his Blue in 1883, appearing 17 times for the university team and played in the 1884 Gentlemen v Players match and was in Oxford which beat the touring Australian team in 1884. After leaving University he played six times for Kent County Cricket Club in 1885 and 1886 and toured America with EJ Sanders' XI, playing in four first-class matches on the tours. He played in a total of 30 first-class matches and continued to play for Devon teams until 1888.

== Later life ==
Hine-Haycock married a widow, Grace Josephine Thornton, in 1915. She died in 1945. He died at his home at Hill House, Kimbolton Road in Bedford in November 1953, aged 91. He had moved to Hill House in 1940 after Christ Church Greyfriars was destroyed by bombing.

== Bibliography ==
- Carlaw, Derek (2020). Kent County Cricketers, A to Z: Part One (1806–1914) (PDF). Cardiff: ACS.
