= Piers Legh =

Piers Legh may refer to:

- Piers Legh (British Army officer) (1890–1955), British Army officer
- Piers Legh (soldier) (1389–1422), English soldier
