= Anthony C. Deane =

Anthony Charles Deane (1870–1946) was canon of Worcester Cathedral, poet and writer of religious books. He was the son of H. C. Deane, a barrister-at-law. In 1898, he married Maud, the second daughter of Col. Versturme-Bunbury of Bath. He is perhaps best known as a writer of popular Christian books.

== Studies ==
He was schooled at Wellington College, and did undergraduate and graduate (M.A.) studies at Clare College, Cambridge. He attended Cuddesdon Theological College and was a student of Lincoln's Inn in 1891.

== Ministry ==
He was ordained in 1893, and became canon of Worcester Cathedral. He was vicar of Great Malvern and rural dean of Powyke from 1909 to 1913, when he became vicar of Hampstead. While at Malvern he was also chaplain of the Worcestershire Yeomanry. In 1929 he was appointed Canon of the ninth stall at St George's Chapel, Windsor Castle, a position he held until 1946. While Canon of Windsor, Deane was also Chaplain to King George VI.

== Author and poet ==
In 1895 he wrote an article in a periodical, The Nineteenth Century, titled The Religion of the Undergraduate, wherein he asserted that an "easy-going agnosticism" was evident in the average student at Oxford. This agnosticism was further accepted as the "symbol of intellectual manhood", being encouraged by younger dons and tacitly accepted by older ones. His remarks were generally countered in the lively debate that followed. In 1905 his poem St. Columba was awarded the Seatonian Prize by the University of Cambridge. He was editor of the Treasury Magazine from 1903 to 1909. He was a member of the Authors' Club, and his recreational activities were listed as golf, lawn tennis and music.

== List of publications ==
Besides various poetry compilations and religious books, some of his talks or sermons also appeared in print:

- Frivolous Verses, Cambridge Eng., Redin, 1892, ISBN 1331630711
- Holiday Rhymes, London, Henry, 1894, ISBN 978-1332140107
- The Religion of the Undergraduate, (article in periodical) The Nineteenth Century, Oct., Nov., Dec., 1895
- Leaves in the Wind, 1896
- A Poet's Choice, 1898
- St. Paul and his Friends, 1900
- New Rhymes for Old and Other Verses, 1901
- A Little Book of Light Verse, London, Methuen, 1902, ISBN 978-1331645481
- Selected Poems of George Crabbe, 1903
- At the Master's Side, 1905
- St. Columba, 1905
- The Reformation, Nisbet & Co, 1907
- The Society of Christ, 1908
- New Testament Studies, 1909
- Christmas Songs and other Verses, 1911
- In My Study, London, J. Nisbet, 1913
- A Short Account of Great Malvern Priory Church, a History of the Monastery, and Description of the Fabric, G. Bell & Sons, ltd, 1914, ISBN 978-1294644675
- His own place: The tercentenary "Shakespeare sermon," preached in the Church of the Holy Trinity, Stratford-on-Avon, 30 April 1916, J. Hewetson & Son, 1916
- A library of religion, London: A.R. Mowbray & co.; Milwaukee, U.S.A.: The Morehouse publishing co., 1918
- Rabboni, A Study of Jesus Christ the Teacher, London, Hodder & Stoughton, 1921
- The Life of Thomas Cranmer, Archbishop of Canterbury, 1927
- Selections from George Crabbe, Deane ed., Methuen; 2nd ed., 1932
- How to enjoy the Bible, Hodder & Stoughton, 1934
- Pillars of the English church: Biographical studies of eminent churchmen; broadcast address, Morehouse publishing co, 1934
- How to understand the gospels, London, Hodder & Stoughton, 1936, ISBN 978-1110476107, ISBN 978-1296185961
- The valley and beyond, New York, Harper, 1936
- Sixth form religion, London, Hodder & Stoughton, 1936 NoISBN
- The Lord's prayer, Hodder & Stoughton, 1938
- St. Paul and his letters, Hodder & Stoughton, 1942
- Jesus Christ, The world Christ knew; the social, personal and political conditions of His time.
- To an unseen audience
- Jesus and the unbroken life
- Time Remembered, London, Faber & Faber, 1945
