= Arthur Horace Penn =

British Army officer (1886–1960)

Sir Arthur Horace Penn, GCVO, MC (20 April 1886 – 30 December 1960), soldier and courtier, was a member of the Royal Household of the Queen Elizabeth the Queen Mother.

== Early life ==
Penn was the son of William Penn, of Taverham Hall, Norwich, where he was born in 1886. He was educated first at Eton, and later at Trinity College, Cambridge where he read law, and was called to the bar of the Inner Temple in 1910. He served as a captain in the Grenadier Guards Special Force from 1916 to 1918, and was adjutant of the 2nd Battalion, and again from 1941 to 1945 as regimental adjutant. He was awarded the Military Cross and the Croix de Guerre for services in World War I.

== Royal service ==
He joined the Royal Household in 1937 at the time of the coronation of King George VI and Queen Elizabeth and was a Groom-in-Waiting to the king, an Extra Equerry in 1940 private secretary to then Queen Elizabeth, when he was appointed as Treasurer to the Queen, which became Treasurer to the Queen Mother upon the death of George VI. He was again appointed Groom-in-Waiting, to Queen Elizabeth II, in 1952.

As a senior member of the royal household, he was a leading guest at the 1947 wedding of Princess Elizabeth and Philip, Duke of Edinburgh.

He was made CVO in 1946, advanced to KCVO in 1949, and to GCVO in 1953.

Penn was chairman of the billbrokers King and Shaxson, Ltd; Steward of the Courts at Eton; and he was the best man at the marriage of Harold Macmillan to Lady Dorothy Cavendish in 1920.

He died a day before he was due to retire from royal service.
