= Maurice Foxell =

British clergyman, artist, and author

Maurice Frederic Foxell KCVO (1888–1981), (Knight Commander of the Royal Victorian Order) was a British clergyman, artist, and author.

Foxell received his education at Christ's Hospital and The Queen's College, Oxford. He held offices in the Church of England including assistant curate at St Paul's, Hammersmith from February 1914 to January 1915), assistant curate in Friern Barnet from January 1915 to March 1917, minor canon at St George's Chapel, Windsor Castle from March 1917 to December 1918, minor canon at St Paul's Cathedral from 1921 to 1939, and rector of St James Garlickhythe from 1939 to 1964.

Foxell served as Deputy Clerk of the Closet, the domestic chaplain to King George VI and later to Queen Elizabeth II.

His other titles included precentor and sub-dean of the Chapels Royal and, earlier, priest-in-ordinary to George VI. He assisted at the christening of Charles, Prince of Wales and the baptism of Prince Andrew, Duke of York. In his office, he represented the Royal Household at funerals and conducted religious services. He retired from the office in 1965.

Foxell was also noted for his printmaking and watercolours. His watercolour Trees and Barn is displayed by the Government Art Collection in London.

He wrote several books, including An Account of the College of Minor Canons of St Paul's Cathedral (1931), The St Paul's Cathedral Psalter Pointed for Chanting (1934), and Wren's Craftsmen at St Paul's Cathedral (1935). Foxell also wrote the children's book Ten Little Pigs. Some of his private papers are now held by the Imperial War Museum.

Foxell's portrait, painted by Walter Bird in 1965, is displayed at the National Portrait Gallery, London.
