= 1933 Birthday Honours =

British government recognitions

The King's Birthday Honours 1933 were appointments by King George V to various orders and honours to reward and highlight good works by members of the British Empire.

The appointments were made to celebrate the official birthday of The King. They were published on 3 June 1933.

The recipients of honours are displayed here as they were styled before their new honour, and arranged by honour, with classes (Knight, Knight Grand Cross, etc.) and then divisions (Military, Civil, etc.) as appropriate.

== British Empire ==
=== Baron ===
- The Right Honourable George Richard Lane-Fox, JP, DL, Member of Parliament for the Barkston Ash Division, 1906-1931. Parliamentary Secretary to the Mines Department, 1922 to 1924 and November 1924 to January 1928. Chairman of the Pig Products Commission 1932, and of Fat Stock Reorganisation Commission. For political and public services.
- Sir Edward Mauger Iliffe, CBE, JP, Member of Parliament for the Tamworth Division, 1923-1929. For political and public services.
- Sir (Samuel) Ernest Palmer, Bt, JP, a Vice-President and Chairman of the Council, Royal College of Music. For services to music.
- Major-General the Right Honourable John Edward Bernard Seely, CB, CMG, DSO, Chairman of the National Savings Committee. For public services.

=== Knights of the Garter ===
- The Right Honourable Victor Alexander George Robert, Earl of Lytton, GCSI, GCIE.

=== Knights of the Thistle ===
- His Royal Highness The Duke of Gloucester, KG, GCVO.
- Edward James, Earl of Elgin and Kincardine, CMG, TD.

=== Privy Councillor ===
- Sir Dennis Henry Herbert, KBE, JP, MP, Member of Parliament for Watford since 1908. Chairman of the Committee of Ways and Means and Deputy Speaker of the House of Commons since September 1931. Deputy Chairman, June 1928 to June 1929.

=== Baronet ===
- Sir Martin John Melvin, JP. For political and public services in Birmingham.
- Sir (Frederick) George Penny, MP, Member of Parliament for Kingston-on-Thames since November 1922. Comptroller of His Majesty's Household since September 1932, and Vice-Chamberlain November 1931 to September 1932. Lord of the Treasury, January 1928 to June 1929 and August to October 1931.

=== Knight Bachelor ===
- Edward Taswell Campbell, MP, Member of Parliament for North-West Camberwell, October 1924 to May 1929, and for Bromley since September 1930. For political and public services.
- William Chapel, Provost of Arbroath. For political and public services in Angus.
- Joseph Henry Pollock Chitty, Chief Master, Chancery Division, Supreme Court of Judicature.
- George Christopher Clayton, CBE, PhD, FIC, JP, MP, Member of Parliament for the Widnes Division, November 1922 to May 1929, and for the Wirral Division since 1931. For political and public services.
- James Travis-Clegg, JP, DL, Chairman of the Lancashire County Council.
- Raymond Henry Payne Crawfurd, MD, FRCP, Consulting Physician, King's College Hospital. Registrar of the Royal College of Physicians, London.
- Robert Doncaster, OBE, JP. For political and public services in Derbyshire.
- William Stewart Duke-Elder, DSc, PhD, MD, ChB, FRCS, Ophthalmic Surgeon, St. George's Hospital, London.
- Wallace Fairweather, DL. For political and public services in Renfrewshire.
- Samuel Gluckstein. For political and public services in the City of Westminster.
- Henry Stuart-Jones, MA, DLitt, FBA, Principal, University College of Wales, Aberystwyth. For services to scholarship and education.
- Alexander Mackenzie Livingstone, JP, Member of Parliament for the Western Isles, 1923-1929. Vice-Chairman of the National Labour Committee since 1932. For political and public services.
- Major John Lomax, OBE. For political and public services in Montgomeryshire.
- Major Henry Edward Lyons, OBE, a member of the Liberal National Council and Executive Committee. For political and public services.
- Senator Dudley Evelyn Bruce McCorkell, MBE, JP, DL, Mayor of Londonderry. For public and philanthropic work in Northern Ireland.
- Joseph Charles McGrath, Clerk of the Peace and Clerk to the West Riding County Council.
- Richard James Meller, JP, MP, Member of Parliament for the Mitcham Division since December 1923. For political and public services.
- Ralph Sneyd Pearson, CIE, FLS, Director, Forest Products Research Laboratory, Department of Scientific and Industrial Research.
- Harry John Preston. For services to sport and philanthropy.
- Ernest Wingate Wingate-Saul, KC, Umpire under the Unemployment Insurance Acts.
- Angus Newton Scott, JP, DL, FCA, Chairman of the London County Council, 1932-1983.
- Charles David Seligman, a member of the Advisory Committee, Export Credits Guarantee Department. A director of Seligman Brothers Ltd.
- John Collings Squire. For services to literature.
- Leonard Henry West, OBE, LLD, JP, DL. For political and public services in Buckinghamshire.
- Brigadier-General Frederic Herbert Williamson, CB, CBE, Director of Postal Services, General Post Office.
- Alderman Edward William Willis, JP, Chairman of the Chatham Conservative Association for the past 31 years. For political and public services in Kent.
- Lieutenant-Colonel Eric Edward Boketon Holt-Wilson, CMG, DSO, General Staff, War Office.

Dominions

- Hugh Thomas Dyke Acland, CMG, CBE, FRCS, Vice President of the Dominion Council of the Australian College of Surgeons, Dominion of New Zealand.
- John Musgrave Harvey, Chief Judge in Equity, and Senior Puisne Judge, State of New South Wales.
- Walter Leitch, CBE, lately Agent-General in London for the State of Victoria.
- Frederick Wollaston Mann. Judge of the Supreme Court, State of Victoria.
- Keith Arthur Murdoch. For public services to the Commonwealth of Australia.

India

- Bijoy Prasad Singh Roy, Minister to the Governor of Bengal for Local Self-Government.
- Raja Rajendra Narayan Bhanja Deo, OBE, Member and Vice-President of the Executive Council of the Governor of Bihar and Orissa.
- Hormusji Maneckji Mehta, Merchant and Millowner, Bombay.
- Syed Ross Masood, Barrister-at-Law,, Vice-Chancellor of the Aligarh Muslim University, United Provinces.
- James Scott Pitkeathly, CMG, CIE, CVO, CBE, DSO, Chief Controller of Stores, Indian Stores Department.
- Charles Banks Cunningham, CSI, Indian Police, Inspector-General of Police, Madras.
- Colonel Robert McCarrison, CIE, KHP, Indian Medical Service, Director, Nutritional Research, Indian Research Fund Association, India.
- Martin Onslow Forster, DSc, PhD, FIC, FRS, lately Director, Indian Institute of Science, Bangalore.
- Kedar Nath Das, CIE, MD, Principal, Carmichael Medical College, Calcutta, Bengal.
- Kenneth Mackenzie MacDonald, Managing Governor of the Imperial Bank of India.
- Khan Bahadur Diwan Abdul Hamid, CIE, OBE, Chief Minister, Kapurthala State, Punjab States.
- Naoroji Bapuji Saklatvala, CIE, Chairman, Messrs. Tata Sons Ltd., Bombay.
- Raja Bahadur Bansilal Motilal, Banker, Hyderabad, Deccan.
- Khan Hashmatullah Khan, Major in the Gwalior State Forces and Member, Council of Regency, Gwalior State.

Colonies, Protectorates, &c

- Arthur William Garrard Bagshawe, CMG, MB, Director, Bureau of Hygiene and Tropical Diseases.
- Samuel John Forster, OBE, Unofficial Member of the Legislative Council of the Gambia. For public services.
- Walter Clarence Huggard, KC, Attorney-General, Straits Settlements.
- Henry Marks, CBE, formerly Unofficial Member of the Executive and Legislative Councils of Fiji. For public services.
- Thomas Lister Villiers, lately Nominated Member of the State Council, Ceylon. For public services.

=== Order of the Bath ===
==== Knight Grand Cross of the Order of the Bath (GCB) ====
Military Division

Royal Navy

- Admiral of the Fleet Sir Frederick Laurence Field, KCB, KCMG.

Army

- General Sir Robert Archibald Cassels, KCB, CSI, DSO, Indian Army, Aide-de-Camp General to The King, General Officer Commanding-in-Chief, Northern Command, India.

Civil Division

- Sir Herbert James Creedy, KCB, KCVO, Permanent Under-Secretary of State for War.
- Colonel the Right Honourable Sir Clive Wigram, GCVO, KCB, CSI, Private Secretary to His Majesty The King.

==== Knight Commander of the Order of the Bath (KCB) ====
Military Division

Royal Navy

- Vice-Admiral Alfred Dudley Pickman Rogers Pound, CB.
- Vice-Admiral Hugh Justin Tweedie, CB.
- Surgeon Vice-Admiral Reginald St. George Smallridge Bond, CB, FRCP, FRCS, MB, CM, DPH, KHP.

Army

- Lieutenant-General George Sidney Clive, CB, CMG, DSO, (late Grenadier Guards) Military Secretary to the Secretary of State for War, and Secretary of the Selection Board.
- Major-General John Francis Stanhope Duke Coleridge, CB, CMG, DSO, Indian Army, Commander, Peshawar District, India.

Royal Air Force

- Air Marshal Hugh Caswall Tremenheere Dowding, CB, CMG.

Civil Division

- Colonel Sir (Michael) Hugh Shaw-Stewart, Bt, CB, TD, Honorary Colonel, 5/6th (Renfrewshire) Battalion, The Argyll and Sutherland Highlanders (Princess Louise's), President and Chairman of the Territorial Army Association of the County of Renfrew.
- George Francis Hill, CB, LittD, LLD, FBA, Director and Principal Librarian of the British Museum.

==== Companion of the Order of the Bath (CB) ====
Military Division

Royal Navy

- Rear-Admiral Henry John Studholme Brownrigg, DSO.
- Rear-Admiral Arthur Lionel Snagge.
- Rear-Admiral Francis Murray Austin.

Army

- Major-General James Andrew Hartigan, CMG, DSO, MB, (late Royal Army Medical Corps), Honorary Physician to The King, Deputy Director of Medical Services, Aldershot Command.
- Major-General Sir Hereward Wake, Bt, CMG, DSO, (late The King's Royal Rifle Corps), Half-Pay List.
- Major-General Arthur Wollaston Bartholomew, CMG, CBE, DSO, (late Royal Artillery), Inspector of the Royal Artillery.
- Major-General Cecil Percival Heywood, CMG, DSO, (late Coldstream Guards), Half-Pay List.
- Major-General Robert John Collins, CMG, DSO, (late The Royal Berkshire Regiment (Princess Charlotte of Wales's)), Half-Pay List.
- Colonel (temporary Brigadier) Frank Henry Burnell-Nugent, DSO, OBE, (late The Rifle Brigade (Prince Consort's Own)), Commander, Tianjin Area.
- Colonel William Hugh Leonard, FRCS, retired pay, late Indian Medical Service.
- Colonel (Honorary Brigadier) Alan Campbell-Ross, DSO, retired pay, late Indian Army.
- Colonel (temporary Brigadier) Hector Campbell, DSO, MVO, Indian Army, Military Adviser-in-Chief, Indian State Forces.
- Colonel Gerald Leslie Pepys, DSO, Indian Army, General Staff Officer, 1st Grade, India Office.
- Colonel Guy George Egerton Wylly, VC, DSO, Indian Army, Aide-de-Camp to The King, Assistant Adjutant, and Quarter-Master-General, Peshawar District, India.

Royal Air Force

- Air Commodore William Foster MacNeece Foster, CBE, DSO, DFC.

Civil Division

- Rear-Admiral Francis George Gillilan Chilton.
- Major-General Gerald Robert Stedall Hickson, CBE, Royal Marines.
- Engineer Rear-Admiral Thompson Gurnell.
- Thomas Briggs Hunter, OBE, MICE.
- Rupert Palmer Colomb, Principal Clerk, Committee and Private Bill Office, House of Commons.
- Walter Cecil Eaton, Principal Assistant Secretary, Board of Education.
- Reginald Herbert Hill, Assistant Secretary, Ministry of Transport.
- Harold Richard Scott, Chairman of the Prison Commission.
- Arthur Landsborough Thomson, OBE, , Assistant-Secretary, Medical Research Council.

=== Order of the Star of India ===
==== Knight Commander of the Order of the Star of India (KCSI) ====
- Captain His Highness Maharaja Aditya Narayan Singh Bahadur, Maharaja of Benares, United Provinces.
- Khan Bahadur Shaikh Sir Ghulam Hussain Hidayatullah, Member and Vice-President of the Executive Council of the Governor of Bombay.

==== Companion of the Order of the Star of India (CSI) ====
- Herbert Aubrey Francis Metcalfe, CIE, MVO, of the Political Department, Foreign Secretary to the Government of India.
- Hubert Calvert, CIE, Indian Civil Service, Financial Commissioner, Punjab.
- Cecil Bernard Cotterell, CIE, Indian Civil Service, Member of the Board of Revenue, Madras.
- Eric Charles Miéville, CMG, Private Secretary to His Excellency the Viceroy.
- Reginald Maitland Maxwell, CIE, Indian Civil Service, Secretary to the Government of Bombay, Home Department, Bombay.
- Arthur Henderson Mackenzie, CIE, Indian Educational Service, Director of Public Instruction, United Provinces.

=== Order of Saint Michael and Saint George ===
==== Knight Grand Cross of the Order of St Michael and St George (GCMG) ====
- Sir Alexander Ransford Slater, KCMG, CBE, Captain-General and Governor-in-Chief of Jamaica.
- Lieutenant-General Sir Arthur Grenfell Wauchope, KCB, CMG, CIE, DSO, High Commissioner and Commander-in-Chief of Palestine.

==== Knight Commander of the Order of St Michael and St George (KCMG) ====
- The Honourable Thomas Rainsford Bavin, KC, formerly Premier of the State of New South Wales.
- The Honourable Walter Massy-Greene, Assistant Treasurer, Commonwealth of Australia.
- Captain The Honourable Bede Edmund Hugh Clifford, CB, CMG, MVO, Governor and Commander-in-Chief of the Bahama Islands.
- Sir John Campbell, CSI, OBE, Economic and Financial Adviser to the Secretary of State for the Colonies.
- Sir James Currie, KBE, CMG, Chairman of the Governing Body of the Imperial College of Tropical Agriculture, Trinidad, Member of the Advisory Committee on Education in the Colonies, and Director of the Empire Cotton Growing Corporation.
- Joseph Addison, CMG, His Majesty's Envoy Extraordinary and Minister Plenipotentiary at Prague.
- Reginald Hervey Hoare, CMG, His Majesty's Envoy Extraordinary and Minister Plenipotentiary at Tehran.
- George Augustus Mounsey, CB, CMG, OBE, an Assistant Under-Secretary of State in the Foreign Office.

==== Companion of the Order of St Michael and St George (CMG) ====
- The Honourable William Charles Angwin, lately Agent-General in London for the State of Western Australia.
- John Saxon Barton, Stipendiary Magistrate, Napier. For public services in the Dominion of New Zealand.
- Thomas Lindsay Buick. For public services in the Dominion of New Zealand.
- The Honourable Lionel Cripps, Speaker of the Legislative Assembly of Southern Rhodesia.
- Robert Ewing, Federal Commissioner of Taxation, Commonwealth of Australia.
- Frederick William Field, His Majesty's Senior Trade Commissioner in Canada and Newfoundland.
- Colonel Frederick Arthur Maguire, DSO, VD, Deputy Director, Army Medical Services, New South Wales, Australian Military Forces.
- Archibald Grenfell Price, DLitt, MA, FRGS, Master, St. Mark's College, and Member of the Council, University of Adelaide. For services to the Commonwealth of Australia.
- Leonard Arthur Robb, President of the New South Wales Branch of the Returned Sailors and Soldiers Imperial League of Australia.
- Lieutenant-Colonel Alexander Elder Beattie, CBE, MC, Colonial Secretary, Gibraltar.
- John Langton Gilks, FRCS, East African Medical Service, Director of Medical and Sanitary Services, Kenya.
- Eric Robert James Hussey, MA, Director of Education, Nigeria.
- Philip Euen Mitchell, MC, Secretary for Native Affairs, Tanganyika Territory.
- Major Herbert Walter Peebles, DSO, OBE, Administrator of Saint Vincent, Windward Islands.
- Paulus Edward Pieris, DLitt, Public Trustee, Ceylon.
- Eustace Lindsay Scott, OBE, MC, Chief Secretary to the Government, Uganda Protectorate.
- Lieutenant-Colonel Cyril Aveling Shute, CBE, Indian Army, Officer Commanding, Trans-Jordan Frontier Force.
- John Strachan, MICE, MIStructE, General Manager and Chief Engineer, Federated Malay States Railways.
- Lieutenant-Colonel Oscar Ferris Watkins, CBE, DSO, Provincial Commissioner, Kenya.
- Frank Trelawny Arthur Ashton-Gwatkin, a First Secretary in the Foreign Office.
- Ernest Bristow, His Majesty's Consul-General at Isfahan.
- Reader William Bullard, CIE, His Majesty's Consul-General at Leningrad.
- Henry Charles Dick, MBE, His Majesty's Consul-General at Vienna.
- Major William Kerr Fraser-Tytler, MC, lately Counsellor in His Majesty's Legation at Kabul.
- Clifford John Norton, Private Secretary to the Permanent Under-Secretary of State for Foreign Affairs.
- Edwin Geoffrey Sarsfield-Hall, Governor of Khartoum Province, Sudan.

=== Order of the Indian Empire ===
==== Knight Grand Commander of the Order of the Indian Empire (GCIE) ====
Honorary Knight Grand Commander

- General His Highness Projjwal-Nepal-Taraati-Pravala Gorkha Dakshina Babu Prithuladheesh Sri Sri Sri Maharaja Sir Joodha Shumshere Jung Bahadur Rana, KCIE, Prime Minister and Supreme Commander-in-Chief of Nepal.

==== Knight Commander of the Order of the Indian Empire (KCIE) ====
- His Highness Raja Pratap Singh, CIE, Raja of Ali Rajpur, Central India.
- Ramasamy Chetty Kandasamy Shanmukham Chetty, President of the Legislative Assembly.
- James Alexander Ossory Fitzpatrick, CIE, CBE, of the Political Department, Agent to the Governor-General, Punjab States.
- William David Russell Prentice, CSI, CIE, Indian Civil Service, Member of the Executive Council of the Governor of Bengal.

==== Companion of the Order of the Indian Empire (CIE) ====
- Thakor Saheb Shri Madarsinhji Vakhatsinhji, Ruler of the Sayla State, Western India States Agency.
- Lieutenant-Colonel James Leslie Rose Weir, of the Political Department, Agent to the Governor-General for the Gujarat States and Resident at Baroda.
- Edmund Currey Gibson, of the Political Department, lately Commissioner, Ajmer-Merwara, and now Agent to the Governor-General, Eastern States, Ranchi.
- Nasservanji Navroji Anklesaria, MLA, Barrister-at-Law.
- William Bailie Brett, Indian Civil Service, Secretary to the Government of Bihar & Orissa, Finance Department.
- Charles St. Leger Teyen, OBE, ISO, lately Secretary to the Government of the United Provinces, Finance Department.
- Colonel (Temporary Brigadier) Robert Heath Anderson, Commanding 3rd (Jhelum) Infantry Brigade.
- John Hunter Adam, OBE, Indian Police, Inspector-General of Police, North-West Frontier Province.
- Herbert Percival Thomas, Chief Engineer, Hydro-Electric Department, Punjab.
- Timothy Patrick Moriarty O'Callaghan, Indian Police, Inspector-General of Police, Assam.
- John Davidson, OBE, Indian Audit and Accounts Service, Accountant-General, Burma.
- Captain Lewis Gonne Eyre Crabbe, DSO, Royal Navy, lately Senior Naval Officer in the Persian Gulf.
- Brevet-Colonel James McPherson, KHS, Indian Medical Service, Residency Surgeon in Mysore, Bangalore.
- James de Graaff Hunter, Survey of India, Director, Geodetic Branch, India.
- Donald Henry Charles Drake, Indian Civil Service, lately Political Agent, Central Provinces States.
- Arthur Gordon Leach, Indian Civil Service, Collector and District Magistrate, Madras.
- David Burnett Meek, OBE, Indian Educational Service, Director-General of Commercial Intelligence and Statistics, Bengal, now serving under the Government of India.
- Lieutenant-Colonel Hugh Francis Eardley Childers, Indian Army, Commandant, Reserve Battalion, Military Police, Pyawbwe, Burma.
- Lieutenant-Colonel Elliot James Dowell Colvin, of the Political Department, Prime Minister, Kashmir State.
- Richard Stanley Purssell, OBE, Deputy Director-General of Posts and Telegraphs.
- Lieutenant-Colonel Walter Lidwell Harnett, Indian Medical Service, Professor of Surgery, Medical College, Calcutta, and Surgeon to the College Hospital, Bengal.
- Khan Bahadur Kavasji Jamshedji Petigara, OBE, ISO, Indian Police, Deputy Commissioner of Police (Special Branch), Bombay.
- Alan Michael Green, Indian Civil Service, Deputy High Commissioner for India, London.
- Jamshedji Nasarvanji Duggan, OBE, LM&S, FCPS, DO (Oxon), Professor of Ophthalmic Medicine and Surgery, Grant Medical College, and Superintendent, C. J. Ophthalmic Hospital, Bombay.
- Arthur John Leech, MBE, Managing Director, Messrs. T. A. Taylor & Co. Ltd., Madras.
- Herbert Michael Shircore, Merchant, Messrs. M. Sarkies & Sons, Narayanganj, Chairman, Narayanganj Municipality, Bengal.

=== Royal Victorian Order ===
==== Knight Grand Cross of the Royal Victorian Order (GCVO) ====
- Charles John Robert, Baron Clinton.
- Colonel The Honourable Sir George Arthur Charles Crichton, KCVO.
- The Honourable Sir Harry Julian Stonor, KCVO.
- Sir Edward Elgar, Bt, OM, KCVO.

==== Knight Commander of the Royal Victorian Order (KCVO) ====
- Rear-Admiral Basil Vernon Brooke, CVO.
- Lieutenant-Colonel Stewart Bleakley Agnew Patterson, CSI, CIE.
- Colonel Thomas Peel Dunhill, CMG, MD.
- Commander Morton Smart, CVO, DSO, MD, late Royal Naval Volunteer Reserve.

==== Commander of the Royal Victorian Order (CVO) ====
- Walter Rangeley Maitland Lamb, MVO.
- Nevile Montagu Butler.
- Claude Taylor, OBE.
- Frank Aubrey Newsam, MC.

==== Member of the Royal Victorian Order, 4th class (MVO) ====
- Lieutenant-Colonel Alan Bruce McPherson, MC.
- Thomas Henry Norton, MVO (5th Class)
- Oliver Dayrell Paget Paget-Cooke.
- Alfred John Newling.

==== Member of the Royal Victorian Order, 5th class (MVO) ====
- Thomas Daniel Williams, DCM.

=== Order of the British Empire ===
==== Dame Commander of the Order of the British Empire (DBE) ====
Civil Division

- Gertrude Mary, Baroness Denman, CBE, Chairman of the National Federation of Women's Institutes.
- Kathleen, Lady Simon. In recognition of her work in connection with the international campaign in support of the Anti-Slavery Convention.

==== Knight Commander of the Order of the British Empire (KBE) ====
Civil Division

- Percy Walter Llewellyn Ashley, CB, Secretary, Import Duties Advisory Committee.
- James Rae, Under-Secretary, His Majesty's Treasury.
- Colonel Stephen Shepherd Allen, CMG, DSO, VD, formerly Administrator of Western Samoa, Dominion of New Zealand.
- Khan Bahadur Nawab Shah Jehan Khan, Nawab of Dir, North-West Frontier Province.
- Wilfrid Thomas Southorn, CMG, Colonial Secretary, Hong Kong.

==== Commander of the Order of the British Empire (CBE) ====
Military Division

Royal Navy

- Captain Henry James Feakes, Royal Australian Navy.

Army

- Colonel Erril Robert O'Hara, CMG, DSO, Assistant Director of Supplies and Transport, Malta.

Civil Division

- Francis Paul Armitage, Director of Education, Leicester County Borough.
- Dorothy Edith Bannon, Matron-in-Chief of the London County Council Hospital Service.
- Henry Joseph Comyns, Assistant Solicitor, Ministry of Health.
- Henry Mendelssohn Hake, Director, Keeper and Secretary, National Portrait Gallery.
- Arthur Canler Hayward, Director of Audit, Exchequer and Audit Department.
- Helen, Lady Leslie Mackenzie. For public services in the interests of women and children in Scotland.
- Hugh John Cole Marshall, OBE, ARIBA, Secretary to the Royal Literary Fund.
- The Reverend Peter Thomas Mignot, Founder of the Mignot Hospital, Alderney. For public services in the Channel Islands.
- Edwin Lawrence Mitchell, OBE, Assistant Secretary, Ministry of Agriculture & Fisheries.
- Victor Edward Pullin, OBE, Director of Radiological Research, Research Department, Royal Arsenal, Woolwich.
- The Reverend Neil Ross, MA, BD, DLitt, JP, President of An Comunn Gàidhealach. For services to Celtic scholarship.
- Ernest Stanford, a member of the Executive of the National Labour Committee. For public and political services.
- Margaret Alicia Waring, JP, MP, Member of Parliament for the Iveagh Division of Northern Ireland since 1929. For political, philanthropic and public services.
- Augustus Duncan Webb, Principal, Intelligence Branch, Board of Customs & Excise.
- John Joseph Wills, Controller, Companies Department, Board of Trade.
- Albert Ernest Branch, OBE, lately Director of the Breeding Department, Egyptian Royal Society of Agriculture.
- Timothy Florence Breen, MC, Press Officer at His Majesty's Embassy in Berlin.
- Calder Marshall, Chairman of the British Chamber of Commerce, Shanghai.
- William Robert Alexander, Clerk of Parliaments, State of Victoria.
- Herbert Charles Brown, Secretary, Department of the Interior, Commonwealth of Australia.
- Henry Chapman, General Manager of the Beira & Mashonaland & Rhodesia Railways.
- Frederick Hugh Dutton, OBE, MA, Director of Education, Basutoland.
- Alfred Harold Gaze, General Manager of the British Phosphate Commission in Nauru.
- James Taylor, Chairman of the Australian Olympic Federation. For public services to the Commonwealth of Australia.
- Lieutenant-Colonel Arthur Gaussen Murray, Indian Army, Command Controller of Accounts, Northern Command.
- Rai Bahadur Paresh Nath Mukerji, Postmaster-General, Madras.
- John Thorne Masey Bennett, MC, Indian Police, Personal Assistant to the Inspector-General of Police, Punjab.
- John Frederick Gennings, Barrister-at-Law, Director of Information and Labour Intelligence, Registrar of Trades Unions, and Commissioner of Workmen's Compensation, Bombay.
- Rao Bahadur Madho Ganesh Deshpande, Landholder and Chairman, Central Provinces and Berar Provincial Co-operative Bank, Nagpur, Central Provinces.
- Henry Arthur Ballou, MSc, Commissioner of Agriculture for the West Indies and Professor of Entomology, Imperial College of Tropical Agriculture, Trinidad.
- Lieutenant-Colonel Harry William Morrey Bamford, OBE, MC, Inspector-General of Police, Gold Coast.
- Major James Alfred Galizia, OBE, Treasurer, Malta.
- John Mapletoft Nethersole, Administrator-General and Trustee in Bankruptcy, Jamaica.
- Major Charles Edward Williams, OBE, MIMechE, Chief Inspecting Engineer, Office of the Crown Agents for the Colonies.

Honorary Commander

- Dato Sedia Raja Abdullah bin Haji Dahan, Undang of Rembau, Negri Sembilan, Federated Malay States.

==== Officer of the Order of the British Empire (OBE) ====
Military Division

Royal Navy

- Commander Wharton Stanley Gray.
- Engineer Commander William Frederick Paffett.
- Captain George Harry Stuart Furlong, RD, Royal Naval Reserve (Retd.)
- Paymaster Commander Ernest William Trivett, Royal Australian Navy.

Army

- Lieutenant-Colonel Kenneth Forsyth Angus, MC, TD, Territorial Army Reserve of Officers, late Commanding Tynemouth Heavy Brigade, Royal Artillery, Territorial Army.
- Lieutenant-Colonel and Brevet Colonel John Ewart Trounce Barbary, MBE, TD, Territorial Army. Reserve of Officers, late Commanding Cornwall Heavy Brigade, Royal Artillery, Territorial Army.
- Major Bijitendra Basu, Indian Medical Service, Specialist in Ophthalmology, Rawalpindi District, India.
- Major Arthur William Beard, Royal Engineers, Indian Army, Garrison Engineer, Lucknow, India.
- Captain John Robert Birchall, MA, Army Educational Corps, Chief Instructor, Army School of Education, India.
- Lieutenant-Colonel Alexander Dawson, MB, Royal Army Medical Corps, Assistant Director of Pathology, Eastern Command.
- Lieutenant-Colonel Charles Albert Denaro, retired pay, late Royal Malta Artillery.
- Colonel Robert Dickie, MC, TD, Territorial Army, late Commanding, Forth Heavy Brigade, Royal Artillery, Territorial Army.
- Major Robinson Elsdale, MC, Royal Corps of Signals.
- Lieutenant-Colonel George Fladgate Finch, TD, Commanding, The Inns of Court Regiment, Territorial Army.
- Lieutenant-Colonel Joseph Holmes Gettins, DSO, BA, Army Educational Corps, Commandant, Army School of Education, Shorncliffe.
- The Reverend John Wesley Knox Griffin, DSO, MA, Chaplain to the Forces (2nd Class), Royal Army Chaplains' Department, Northern Ireland District.
- Temporary Major St. George Eyre Harris, MD, Royal Army Medical Corps, Cambridge Hospital, Aldershot.
- Major (Commissary) Harry Joyner, MBE, Indian Corps of Clerks (India Unattached List), Chief Clerk, Headquarters, Northern Command, India.
- Major Donald Gordon MacLeod, Officer Commanding, Scottish Company, Straits Settlements Volunteer Force.
- Major Paul Phillips Mallam, MC, Glasgow Academy Contingent, Officers' Training Corps.
- Captain Lavinius Brice Marchant, Indian Army Service Corps, Station Transport Officer, Rawalpindi-Murree Area, India.
- Major (Mechanist Officer) George William Martin, MBE, retired pay, late Royal Army Service Corps.
- Quartermaster and Honorary Major John McArthur, DSO, Instructional Corps, Australian Military Forces.
- Lieutenant-Colonel & Brevet Colonel Sydney Arthur Medcalf, TD, 44th (Home Counties) Divisional Train, Royal Army Service Corps, Territorial Army.
- Major (Commissary) Wilfred Morris, MBE, Indian Corps of Clerks (India Unattached List), Chief Clerk, Headquarters, Southern Command, India.
- Major Eric Newbold, Officer Commanding, Eurasian Company, Straits Settlements Volunteer Force.
- Lieutenant-Colonel (Quarter-Master) Arthur Richard Newling, Extra Regimentally Employed List, Quartermaster and Adjutant, Royal Military School of Music.
- Lieutenant-Colonel Douglas Duke Paine, DSO, VD, Commanding Officer, Army Service Corps, 3rd Australian Division, Victoria, Australian Military Forces.
- Captain Alfred Henry Dunlop Phillips, retired pay, late Royal Artillery, Ordnance Committee.
- Major and Commissary of Ordnance Frederick Sydney Smith, retired pay, late Royal Army Ordnance Corps.
- Major Francis Basil Brook Spragge, MC, Royal Artillery, late brigade major, Bermuda.
- Captain John Stephenson, The Hazara Pioneers, Indian Army.
- Major Alexander Smith Turnham, 10th Royal Hussars (Prince of Wales's Own).

Royal Air Force

- Wing Commander Arthur Geoffrey Nevill Belfield.
- Wing Commander Coningsby Leslie Colbran, LDS.
- Squadron Leader Thomas Edward Drowley.
- Wing Commander William Hopton Anderson, DFC, Royal Australian Air Force.

Civil Division

- George Abbiss, MBE, Chief Constable, Metropolitan Police.
- Alfred John Ardern, Postmaster-Surveyor of Belfast.
- Allan Carruth, Divisional Land Officer, Department of Agriculture for Scotland.
- Councillor John William Cooke. For many years Secretary, and now Chairman, of the Holland-with-Boston Liberal Association. For political and public services in Lincolnshire.
- Thomas William Cooper, Senior Inspector of Taxes, Board of Inland Revenue.
- James Eraser Cunninghame, MBE, JP, Chairman of the Leith Unionist Association. For political and public services in Scotland.
- Jessie Isa Falconer, Head Teacher and Principal of the Royal Institution for the Blind, Birmingham.
- Alderman Francis Thomas Foulger, Chairman of the Northern London War Pensions Committee.
- George Julian Gilbert, MBE, Principal Clerk, Ministry of Pensions.
- Archibald Gilpin, Assistant Director of Works, Air Ministry.
- Frank Wyndham Hirst, Trust Officer, Public Trustee Office.
- Frederick Houghton, JP, Chairman of the Oldham & District Local Employment Committee.
- William Charles Jenkins, President of the Swansea West Liberal Association. For political and public services.
- Lilian Le Mesurier, Has organised voluntary work in connection with the London Boys Prison.
- Charles George Maby, MBE, Chief Constable of the Bristol City Police.
- David Johnston MacDonald, JP, MIMechE, Member of the Dundee Local Employment Committee and lately Chairman of the Local Juvenile Advisory Committee.
- James MacDougall, JP. For political and public services in Scotland.
- John Mackinnon, Assistant Chief Constable, Edinburgh City Police.
- Donald Maclean, MA, Headmaster, Boroughmuir Secondary School, Edinburgh.
- Lieutenant-Colonel Archibald Matheson, DSO, Principal, Ministry of Transport.
- Fred Morton, Deputy Divisional Controller, North Eastern Division, Ministry of Labour.
- Evan Edward Owens, MC, LRCS, LRCP, LRFPS. For political and public services in Glamorganshire.
- Hugh De Bock Porter, Official Solicitor, and Assistant Steward of the Manors, Ecclesiastical Commission.
- James Putnam. Lately Superintending Executive Officer, India Office.
- Joseph Harold Salmon, MBE, FSI, Director of Lands & Accommodation, HM Office of Works & Public Buildings.
- Samuel Sloan, Principal Establishment Officer, Ministry of Finance, and Secretary, Civil Service Commission, Northern Ireland.
- Emily Julia Slocock, Superintending Inspector of Factories, Home Office.
- Richard Arthur Thomas, JP, Chairman of the Metalliferous Mining Advisory Committee, Mines Department of the Board of Trade.
- Leonard James Veit, FSI, City Engineer and Surveyor to the Westminster City Council.
- Jane Webster, Clerk in the Lord Chamberlain's Office, Buckingham Palace.
- John Thomas Whitelaw, District Manager, Post Office Telephones.
- John Alexander Cameron, His Majesty's Consul at Danzig.
- The Reverend Prebendary Frederic Anstruther Cardew, Rector of the Anglican Church, Paris, and Rural Dean for France.
- Clermont Grantham Hill, Senior Surgeon, Khartoum Hospital.
- Major Claude Scudamore Jarvis, Governor of Sinai.
- Harold Clayforth Mason, Government Architect, Iraq.
- Karl Reginald Cramp, President, Royal Australian Historical Society, State of New South Wales.
- The Reverend John Flynn, Superintendent of the Australian Inland Mission, Commonwealth of Australia.
- Mona Godhard. For charitable services in the State of New South Wales.
- John William Justham, Manager of the Co-operative Wholesale Society's branches at Bristol and Cardiff. Member of the Food Products Committee of the Empire Marketing Board.
- Makea Nui Tinirau Ariki of Rarotonga, Paramount Chief of Cook Island, Dominion of New Zealand.
- Colin Mackenzie Pitt, Surveyor and Engineer, Public Works Department, State of Tasmania.
- Frederick Geoffrey Shedden, Assistant on External Affairs to the Resident Minister in London, Commonwealth of Australia.
- Albert Kinder Townsend, Accountant, Central Staff, Department of Trade & Customs, Commonwealth of Australia.
- Hugh Wright, lately Librarian, Mitchell Library, State of New South Wales.
- Khan Bahadur Allahbakhsh, MLC, Zamindar, President of the District Local Board, Sukkur, Sind, Bombay.
- Captain Basil Laing Clay, Indian Army, lately Private Secretary to His Excellency the Governor of Burma.
- Alfred William Connolly, MBE, Works Manager, Rifle Factory, Ishapore, Bengal.
- Abul Fazl Abdul Hamid, Indian Police, Superintendent of Police, Bihar & Orissa.
- Captain Thomas Francis Henry Kelly, Indian Army, Private Secretary to His Excellency the Governor of the Central Provinces.
- Kunwar Haji Ismaiel Ali Khan, MLA, Chairman, City Board, Mussoorie, United Provinces.
- Albert John King, Indian Service of Engineers, Executive Engineer, Personal Assistant to the Chief Engineer to the Government of Bengal.
- Ahmedbhoy Ismailbhoy Abdoolabhoy Lalljee, Head of the firm of Nasirbhoy Lalljee, Aden.
- Lachlan Macpherson Ryley, MBE, Inspector of Small Arms, Ishapore, Bengal.
- Commander Robert Severs, RD, Royal Naval Reserve (Retd.), Indian Marine Service, lately Personal Assistant to the Presidency Port Officer and Agent for Government Consignments, Madras.
- Erachshaw Dinshaw Shroff, LRCP, Health Officer of the Karachi Municipality, Bombay.
- Captain Maurice Revell Sinclair, Indian Medical Service, Officer on special duty with the Political Officer in Sikkim.
- Arthur Falconer Barren. For services in connection with the development of the tobacco industry in the Nyasaland Protectorate.
- William Alexander Jex Bowman. For services in connection with the development of the grapefruit industry in British Honduras.
- Edwin Arthur Brown, Municipal Commissioner, Singapore, Straits Settlements Police Force.
- Major Henry Noel Davies, MInstT, Deputy General Manager of Railways, Tanganyika Territory.
- John Coleman de Graft Johnson, Assistant Secretary for Native Affairs, Gold Coast.
- Captain Edward Nigel Park, MC, District Officer, Somaliland Protectorate.
- Charles Henry Pierre, KC, Unofficial Member of the Legislative Council and Member of the Executive Council, Colony of Trinidad & Tobago. For public services.
- Harold Francis Cartmel-Robinson, District Commissioner, Northern Rhodesia.
- The Reverend Samuel Hanna Semple, MA, Principal of the Scots College, Safad, Palestine.
- Elwood D'Arcy Tibbits, MBE, Assistant Colonial Secretary, Leeward Islands.
- Aloysius Gordon Tillekeratne, Assistant Postmaster General, Ceylon.
- The Reverend Harry Webster, General Superintendent of the Methodist Mission, Gold Coast. For public services.
- Florence Kerr Wilson. For services to civil aviation in Kenya.
- William Younger, Superintendent of Police, Criminal Investigation Department, Uganda Protectorate.

Honorary Officer

- Michel Fred Abcarius, Senior Assistant Treasurer, Palestine.

==== Member of the Order of the British Empire (MBE) ====
Military Division

Royal Navy

- Paymaster Lieutenant Francis Samuel Vallis, Royal Navy.
- Commissioned Wardmaster William Herbert Pickard, Royal Navy.
- Sergeant-Major Arthur Alfred Attwood, MSM, Royal Marines.
- Boatswain Sheikh Ibrahim Kaka, Royal Indian Marine.
- Commissioned Gunner (T) George Thomas Saunders, Royal Australian Navy.

Army

- Captain and Paymaster Robert Cuming de Vere Askin, MC, Royal Army Pay Corps.
- Temporary Captain Frank Arthur Shepherd Atterton, Royal Engineers.
- No. 6825001 Warrant Officer Class II, Regimental Quartermaster-Sergeant Leslie Creswell Barrow, Honourable Artillery Company (Infantry Battalion), Territorial Army.
- Captain Frederick Bartlett, Quarter-Master, retired pay, late Royal Army Service Corps.
- Captain (Deputy Commissary) George Frederick Baxter, Military Engineer Services (India Unattached List), Garrison Engineer, Delhi, India.
- Captain Joseph George Morrogh Bernard, The East Yorkshire Regiment, late attached Sudan Defence Force.
- No. 1850609 Warrant Officer Class I, Superintending Clerk Charles George Bourne, Royal Engineers, Aldershot Command.
- Warrant Officer Class II, Quartermaster-Sergeant Percy Henry Bryant, Royal Army Ordnance Corps, attached Egyptian Army.
- Lieutenant Edmund Graham Buckley, The Rifle Brigade (Prince Consort's Own), attached Iraq Levies.
- Captain Anthony Charles Buxton, retired pay, late Royal Engineers, late Commanding, 35th (Fortress) Company, Royal Engineers.
- Quartermaster and Honorary Major Marmaduke Coats, Instructional Corps, Australian Military Forces.
- No. 2556066 Warrant Officer Class II, Company Sergeant-Major George Urban Cooke, DCM, 46th (North Midland) Divisional Signals, Royal Corps of Signals, Territorial Army.
- Captain Harry Stephen Crane, Royal Artillery, Range Officer, Salisbury Plain.
- Captain Harry Clifford de la Bere, Royal Army Service Corps, China Command.
- No. 6515026 Warrant Officer Class II, Company Sergeant-Major Frank Denton, 1st City of London Regiment (The Royal Fusiliers), Territorial Army.
- No. 3433657 Warrant Officer Class II, Company Sergeant-Major William Fletcher, DCM, 8th Battalion, The Lancashire Fusiliers, Territorial Army.
- No. 705101 Warrant Officer Class II, Colour Sergeant (local Company Sergeant-Major) Robert Alfred Frazer, The Royal Scots (The Royal Regiment), attached Iraq Levies.
- Captain Gwynne Griffith, MC, Assistant Adjutant, Ceylon Light Infantry, Ceylon Defence Force.
- Captain and Ordnance Mechanical Engineer 3rd Class, Frederick Colin Johnstone-Hall, AMIMechE, Royal Army Ordnance Corps, London District.
- No. 7681309 Warrant Officer Class I, Sergeant-Major Edward Harrison, Military Mounted Police, Aldershot Command.
- No. 7720693 Warrant Officer Class I, Instructor (Education) William Frederick Hawkins, Army Educational Corps, Malta.
- Conductor Henry Jenkins, Indian Army Service Corps (India Unattached List), No. 5 District Supply Company, Dargai, India.
- Quartermaster and Honorary Major William Kennedy, MC, Instructional Corps, Australian Military Forces.
- Lieutenant Ernest James Kenneison, Federated Malay States Volunteer Force.
- Captain Tom Ashley Lakeman, Royal Tank Corps, Assistant Instructor, Tank Gunnery School.
- Risaldar Lall Singh, Probyn's Horse (5th King Edward's Own Lancers), Indian Army, Aide-de-Camp to His Excellency the Commander-in-Chief in India.
- Conductor Francis Arthur Marshall, Indian Corps of Clerks (India Unattached List), Headquarters, Northern Command, India.
- No. 2714122 Warrant Officer Class I, Superintending Clerk, Thomas Dominic McCarthy, Irish Guards.
- No. 2968407 Warrant Officer Class II, Company Sergeant-Major John McDonald, MC, DCM, 8th (The Argyllshire) Battalion, The Argyll & Sutherland Highlanders (Princess Louise's), Territorial Army.
- No. 7040151 Warrant Officer Class I, Garrison Sergeant-Major John McGerr, Garrison Staff, Malta.
- Lieutenant (local Captain) Frederick James McWhinnie, Regular Army Reserve of Officers, The King's Regiment, attached Iraq Levies.
- No. 7717049 Warrant Officer Class I, Garrison Sergeant-Major William Maxwell, Garrison Staff, Chatham.
- Lieutenant (local Captain) Beverley Charles Moody, Regular Army Reserve of Officers, General List, attached Iraq Levies.
- No. S/1334 Warrant Officer Class I, Staff Sergeant-Major Harold Percy Newberry, Royal Army Service Corps, Western Command.
- No. 2200754 Warrant Officer Class II, Company Sergeant-Major Cecil Leonard Newman, 47th (2nd London) Divisional Engineers, Royal Engineers, Territorial Army.
- Lieutenant Walter Fisher Ridler, late Royal Artillery, Commandant, Tianjin British Municipal Emergency Corps.
- No. 7579012 Warrant Officer Class II, Armament Quartermaster-Sergeant Edward Roberts, Royal Army Ordnance Corps, Coast Artillery School, Shoeburyness.
- No. 2744741 Warrant Officer Class I, Regimental Sergeant-Major Edward Robertson, MM, Depot, The Black Watch (Royal Highlanders).
- No. 1660562 Warrant Officer Class II, Battery Sergeant-Major John William Rose, Lancashire & Cheshire Heavy Brigade, Royal Artillery, Territorial Army.
- No. 3589012 Warrant Officer Class II, Regimental Quartermaster-Sergeant John Sarginson, 4th (Cumberland & Westmorland) Battalion, The Border Regiment, Territorial Army.
- No. S/1246 Warrant Officer Class I, 1st Class Staff Sergeant-Major Charles Joseph Saunders, Royal Army Service Corps, Adjutant-General's Department, The War Office.
- No. 1396135 Warrant Officer Class II, Quartermaster-Sergeant Saddler Joseph Eric Stevens, 11th (Honourable Artillery Company & City of London Yeomanry) Brigade, Royal Horse Artillery, Territorial Army.
- Quartermaster and Honorary Major William Walter Tracy, Instructional Corps, Australian Military Forces.
- Lieutenant (Quartermaster) John Stanley Webber, 2nd Battalion, The Somerset Light Infantry (Prince Albert's).
- No. 7657270 Warrant Officer Class I, Staff Sergeant-Major Albert Wills, Royal Army Pay Corps, The War Office.
- Risaldar Mohomed Yakub Khan, Indian Army Veterinary Corps, In Charge Military Veterinary Hospital, Karachi.
- Lieutenant Frederick Walter Young, 1st Battalion, The Lincolnshire Regiment.

Honorary Member

- Yuzbashi Mohsin bin Alowi Aulaqi, Aden Protectorate Levies.

Royal Air Force

- Flight Lieutenant Lawrence Fleming Pendred, DFC.
- Flying Officer Francis Patrick Donovan.
- Warrant Officer Joseph Enoch Beresford.
- Warrant Officer Daniel Henry Newton.

Civil Division

- Thomas Albert Bennett, Accountant, Mines Department of the Board of Trade.
- Harry William Strafford Biden, Staff Officer, Scottish Education Department, Edinburgh.
- Charles Blackwood, Head Postmaster at Bath, General Post Office.
- John Howard Blair, Chief Collector of Taxes in Belfast, Board of Inland Revenue.
- Edgar Owen Byers, Junior Examiner, HM Land Registry.
- Minnie Louise Cale, Accountant, Ministry of Labour.
- Georgina Agnes Brown Cameron, Superintendent Health Visitor and Inspector of Midwives, Newcastle-on-Tyne.
- Clarence Clixby Cartwright, Principal Clerk, Bankruptcy Department, Supreme Court of Judicature.
- Gwynedd Lennox Chase, Superintendent of Typists, Import Duties Advisory Committee.
- Ernest Louis Clair, Superintendent, Higher Grade, Central Telegraph Office, General Post Office.
- Albert John Davies, Superintendent and Deputy Chief Constable, Cornwall Constabulary.
- Hannah Mary Frank, Headmistress, Crosby Infants School, Scunthorpe, Lincolnshire.
- Clara Fyfe. For political and public services in Newcastle-upon-Tyne.
- Charles Henry James Garland, ISO, Organising Secretary, National Playing Fields Association.
- Walter James Garnett, Acting Assistant Principal, Oversea Settlement Department (serving with the representative in Australia of HM Government in United Kingdom).
- Major Harold Wilkinson Dale-Glossop, Commandant, Metropolitan Special Constabulary Reserve.
- James William Golsby, Senior Intelligence Officer, Department of Overseas Trade.
- Edith Elizabeth Greaves, Matron of the City of London Maternity Hospital, City Road.
- William Edward Hardwick, MRST, Headmaster, St. Peter's Church of England Schools, Harborne, Birmingham.
- James Woodhatch Hills, Headmaster, Boys' Department, St. Luke's Church of England School, Canning Town.
- William James Hodgetts, Assistant Engineer, General Post Office.
- Henry Home, Civil Assistant and Accountant, No. 3 Stores Depot, Royal Air Force.
- Colwell Iddon, Higher Clerical Officer, India Office.
- Charles Symonds Jones, Superintendent, Cardiff City Police.
- David John Jones, Clerk and Solicitor to the Rhondda Urban District Council.
- Lieutenant Henry William Jones, DCM, Retired Officer, Adjutant-General's Department of the War Office.
- John Tysilio Jones, JP, Chairman of the Wrexham Local Employment Committee.
- Valentine Tom Keen, JP, Chairman of the Fareham Urban District Council, and for 20 years Goods Foreman on the London & South Western Railway.
- Elizabeth Alletta Clark-Kennedy, Maternity Sister, Radcliffe Infirmary.
- John Hamilton Killough, Superintending Officer, Ministry of Labour, Northern Ireland.
- Alice Vera Knight, Supervisor of Typists, Clearing Office for Enemy Debts, Board of Trade.
- Eileen Janet Lecky. For maternity and child welfare work in Putney.
- Marian Macdonald, Chairman of the Children's Sub-Committee of the Stepney & Poplar War Pensions Committee.
- Joseph White May, Organiser of Education to the Great Yarmouth Education Committee.
- Thomas Morton, Officer of Customs & Excise.
- William Murrell, Train-Bearer to the Speaker of the House of Commons.
- William Richard Neighbour, Cashier, HM Dockyard, Portsmouth.
- Edith Nurse, Chief Supervisor, London Telephone Service, General Post Office.
- William O'Dea, Headmaster of St. Anne's School, Ancoats, Manchester. Has for many years represented Catholic Teachers on the Catholic Education Council.
- Frank Rowland Palmer, Chief Superintendent, Manchester City Police.
- George Pethard, Secretary of the Society of Miniature Rifle Clubs.
- Isabella Scott Reid, Superintendent, Wellshill Girls' (Industrial) School, Perth.
- Helen Roberts, RRC, Matron, Ministry of Pensions Nursing Service.
- Thomas Rossiter, Chairman of the Children's Sub-Committee of the Burton-on-Trent, Lichfield & District War Pensions Committee.
- Edward Roughley, Higher Clerical Officer, Secondary Schools Section, Board of Education.
- Louisa Ford Sadler. For political and public services in Kent.
- Charles Joseph Seaman, FSI, AMInstCE, MIMechE, MIChemE, Chairman of the Poplar Juvenile Advisory Committee.
- George Steel, MSM, Registrar, HM Office of Works & Public Buildings.
- Matilda Tennent. For political and public services in Scotland.
- James Wilson, Superintendent, Metropolitan Police.
- William Nicholls Winn, Botanist, Royal Botanic Gardens, Kew.
- The Reverend Archibald Henry Beer, British Vice-Consul at San Pedro de Macorís, Dominican Republic.
- Daisy Bramble. Services in connection with native girls' and mid-wives' schools and native craftsmen of Omdurman.
- Commander Walter Francis Brothers, RD, Royal Naval Reserve (Retd.), British Consular Agent at Ismailia, Egypt.
- Arthur Noel Cumberbatch, Assistant to the Commercial Secretary at His Majesty's Legation in Athens.
- Joshua Goodall, Chief Draftsman, Sudan Railways.
- Eleanor Muriel Henderson, Matron of the British Hospital at Montevideo.
- Daniel Albert Newick, Telegraph Department, Baghdad.
- Thomas Miller Reid, British Vice-Consul at Orotava, Canary Islands.
- Mary Robertson. For services as nurse at Larco Herrera Asylum at Magdalena del Mar, Peru, and for bravery in disarming a criminal lunatic.
- George Edward Russell Sandars, District Commissioner, Sudan Political Service.
- George Wingrove Vincent, Archivist at His Majesty's Embassy in Moscow.
- Edith Anderson. For social and child welfare services in Southern Rhodesia.
- Phyllis Mary Boissier, RRC, Matron, Royal Prince Alfred Hospital, Sydney, State of New South Wales.
- The Reverend Stanley Garlick Drummond, Honorary Organiser of the Far West Children's Health Scheme, State of New South Wales.
- Russell England, Dairy Expert and Inspector, Bechuanaland Protectorate.
- Penelope Jane Forbes. For social and child welfare services in Southern Rhodesia.
- Thomas Fox. For services in connection with returned soldiers movements in the State of New South Wales.
- Robert Ashley Gilfillan, lately Chairman of the Superannuation Fund Board, State of New South Wales.
- Captain Grant Clinton Hanlon. For services in connection with returned soldiers movements in the State of New South Wales.
- Albert James Odgers, Private Secretary to the Postmaster-General, Commonwealth of Australia.
- William Thomas Curtis-Willson. For services in connection with Empire Shopping Week Campaigns at Brighton.
- Rai Bahadur Malik Devi Dayal, retired Deputy Superintendent of Police, Delhi City.
- Edward William Dunn, Assam Engineering Service, Assistant Engineer, Assam.
- Khan Sahib Karmali Ebrahim, Merchant, Bombay.
- Edward Charles Garraty, lately Head Appraiser, Customs Department, Burma.
- Khan Bahadur Mian Aftab Gul, Rais of Abazai, Peshawar District, North-West Frontier Province.
- Piyare Lai Chandu Lai, Diwan, Bilaspur State, Punjab States.
- Arthur Henry Whitter Leonard, Superintendent, Dacca Central Jail, Bengal.
- Gustave Martin, Director of Music, His Excellency the Governor's Band, Madras.
- John Renick Morris, Deputy Superintendent of Police, Punjab.
- Rai Bahadur Babu Hardeo Prasad, Advocate, Fyzabad, United Provinces.
- Raphael Abraham Raphael, General Merchant and Manager of the Bassein Electric Supply Co., President, Bassein Municipality, Burma.
- Gerald Corley Smith of the Imperial Secretariat Service, Assistant Secretary to the Government of India, Commerce Department.
- Alfred William Want, Cantonment Superintendent, Nowshera, North-West Frontier Province.
- William Frederick Webster, Superintendent of the Reformatory School at Hazaribagh, Bihar & Orissa.
- Bamanji Hormusji Mistri, lately Senior Non-European Clerk, Kenya.
- Elizabeth Coldwell. For charitable services in Malta.
- Charles Cosgrow, lately Registrar of Deeds, Seychelles.
- Paul Gaspar da Silva, formerly Assistant Secretary, Northern Provinces Secretariat, Nigeria.
- James Doherty, Government Treasury and Coast Agent, Mombasa, Kenya.
- Henrietta Millicent Douglas. For public and charitable services in Grenada, Windward Islands.
- John Crundwell Thomas Earll, Chief Inspector of Works, Engineering Department, Railways, Tanganyika Territory.
- Patricia Ruth Elliott, MB. For services as a missionary doctor in the Straits Settlements.
- Major Stanley Fernando. For services in the promotion and encouragement of athletics in Ceylon.
- Hubert Taylor Harrington, formerly Assistant Magistrate, Northern Rhodesia. For public services.
- Beatrice Jane Locket, Matron, Maternity Association, Zanzibar.
- Edwin Frank McDavid, Deputy Colonial Treasurer, British Guiana.
- Edward Henry McKinney, Out Island Commissioner, Bahamas.
- Frederic Gardiner Rose, MD, Medical Superintendent, Leper Asylum, British Guiana.
- Aston Shedden Rutty, Collector and Postmaster, Cayman Brae, Jamaica.
- Eibert Seimund, Technical Assistant, Selangor Museum, Federated Malay States.
- Annie Middleton Sime. For charitable and child welfare work in Singapore, Straits Settlements.
- Van Robert Harris van Buren. For services as Commissioner, Workmen's Compensation Court, Colony of Trinidad & Tobago.

Honorary Members

- Ragheb Effendi Mohammad, Sub-Inspector of Agriculture, Department of Agriculture & Forests, Palestine.
- Isaac Ben Zvi. For public services in Palestine.

==== Medal of the Order of the British Empire ====
For Meritorious Service
Military Division

Royal Navy

- Hugh Burton Gill, Leading Telegraphist O.N. P/J 29625 (HMS Furious).
- William Walter Brown, Chief Shipwright 1st Class, O.N. P/M 6548 (HMS Tedworth).
- Alfred Richard Caiger, Chief Petty Officer, O.N. P/J 6245 (HMS Excellent).

Army

- No. 7871890 Sergeant William Douglas Anscombe, Mechanical Warfare Experimental Establishment, Royal Tank Corps.
- No. 1864275 Lance-Corporal John Stoddart Barnett, Royal Engineers, Gibraltar.
- No. S/391627 Corporal George Manners Lamb, Royal Army Service Corps, Southern Command.
- No. 740822 Battery Quartermaster-Sergeant William Henry Lanham, 66th (South Midland) Field Brigade, Royal Artillery, Territorial Army.
- No. 1021894 Battery Quartermaster-Sergeant Norman Lloyd, MM, Royal Artillery.
- No. 6842260 Colour Sergeant Alexander Whitten, The King's Royal Rifle Corps, attached Sudan Defence Force.

Royal Air Force

- 351871 Flight Sergeant Francis White.
- 362493 Corporal Frederick Walter Clarke.
- 507321 Leading Aircraftman William Jopling.

Civil Division

- Frank Taylor Bird, Inspector, Post Office Engineering Department.
- James David Crisp, Laboratory Assistant, Royal Army Veterinary School.
- Patrick Dufficy, Constable, Metropolitan Police Force.
- Alfred Edward Smith, Skilled Workman, Class II, Post Office Engineering Department.
- Frederick Charles Webber, Rural Postman, Wiveliscombe Sub-Office, Taunton.
- Frank William Wood, Constable, Metropolitan Police Force.
- Abdalla Erbab, 1st Class Linesman, Posts & Telegraphs Department, Sudan.
- Ibrahim El Nairn, Sol (Warrant Officer), Sudan Railways Police.
- Sheikh Awad Othman, Superintendent of the Government Rest-House, Khartoum, Sudan.
- Lai Chand Dewan, Head Clerk, 1st Assyrian Battalion, Iraq Levies.
- James Nelson Dutt, Head Clerk, 2nd Assyrian Battalion, Iraq Levies.
- Frederick Carlisle Beckwith, Head Assistant (Inspector of Police), Special Branch, Criminal Investigation Department, Bihar & Orissa, India.
- Adelene Edith Hilton, Lady Deputy Superintendent, Female Jail, Lahore, Punjab, India.
- S. Sardar Singh, Inspector of Police and Head Clerk to the Senior Superintendent of Police, Delhi, India.
- Paul Ebejer, Head Messenger and Custodian of the Valletta Palace, Malta.
- Wadi Effendi Masad, Inspector, Palestine Police.
- Panayis Irini Zambias. For services in rescuing a child and its mother from a burning house in the village of Rizokarpasso, Cyprus.

=== Companion of the Imperial Service Order (ISO) ===
Home Civil Service

- John William Atherton, Superintending Cartographer and Assistant Superintendent of Charts, Hydrographic Department, Admiralty.
- Ambrose Joseph Biggs, OBE, General Manager of Printing Works, HM Stationery Office.
- Fred Buckingham, Accountant, Charity Commission.
- Ernest Cozens Cooke, Deputy Director of Audit, Exchequer & Audit Department.
- Arthur Richard Cordingley, Accountant, Accountant-General's Department, Board of Education.
- John Lamb Frood, MRCVS, Superintending Inspector, Diseases of Animals Division, Ministry of Agriculture & Fisheries.
- Albert James Holt-Green, Senior Examiner, Estate Duty Office, Board of Inland Revenue.
- Percy Hall Grimshaw, Keeper, Natural History Department, Royal Scottish Museum.
- John Hedley, MIEE, Staff Engineer, General Post Office.
- Charles Barton Hobbins, Principal Clerk, National Debt Office.
- William McAuslan, Engineer Surveyor-in-Chief, Board of Trade.
- Walter Alexander Magill, Assistant Secretary, Ministry of Home Affairs, Northern Ireland.
- John Durnford Ryall, lately Collector of Customs & Excise, Board of Customs & Excise, Edinburgh.
- George William Wight, lately Head of Branch, Department of Health for Scotland.
- Ernest Edward Wilkinson, MBE, Librarian to the Colonial Office and the Dominions Office (Dated 15 May 1933).

Dominions

- Edgar John Field, Director of Lands, State of South Australia.
- Alexander Ronald Grant, Clerk of Parliaments, State of Western Australia.
- Stewart Irwin, lately Chief Electoral Officer, Commonwealth of Australia.
- Charles Glazebrook Morris, Under Secretary for Lands & Immigration, State of Western Australia.
- Theophilus Benjamin Strong, MA, BSc, lately Director of Education, Dominion of New Zealand.

Indian Civil Services

- Rai Bahadur Tarak Chandra Datta, Superintendent, Office of the Inspector-General of Police, Bengal.
- Frank Augustus D'Souza, Land Records Department, Assistant Director of Land Records, Burma.
- Anthony Francis Saturnino Ferram, Extra Assistant Commissioner, Aden.
- Gottfried Ernest John Heagert, Assistant Secretary to the Government of the Punjab, Public Works Department, Buildings and Roads Branch, Punjab.
- William Edward Hogan, Superintendent of Excise, Bombay Division, Bombay.
- Shanker Ramchandra Korde, Head Assistant, Indian Army Service Corps.
- Ernest Everard Leicester, of the Imperial Secretariat Service, Superintendent, Foreign and Political Department, Government of India.
- Murray James MacDonald, Registrar, Chief Commissioner's Office, Delhi.
- Robert Lawrence Molloy, District Board Engineer, Bellary, Madras.
- Charles Alfred Stanley Perry, VD, Registrar, Public Works Department, Assam Secretariat, Assam.

Colonies, Protectorates, &c.

- Alban Ernest Daviot, Assistant Collector of Customs, Ceylon.
- Charles Edward Frith, Chief Inspector, Sanitary Department, Hong Kong.
- Charles Hannigan, lately Commissioner of Police, Federated Malay States.
- Adonijah Richard Harris, Supervisor of Customs, Sierra Leone.
- George Cunynghame Johnson, Treasurer, Saint Christopher & Nevis, Leeward Islands.
- John Laird, lately Warden of Mines, Perak, Federated Malay States.
- Charles Francis Lassalle, MD, Deputy Surgeon-General and Medical Inspector of Health, Colony of Trinidad & Tobago.
- Harold Ernest Phillips, Commissioner, Turks & Caicos Islands, Jamaica.
- Andrew Joseph Sheedy, Chief Police Officer, Penang, Straits Settlements.
- Charles Livingston Wilson, Colonial Postmaster, Grenada, Windward Islands.

=== Imperial Service Medal ===
In recognition of long and meritorious service

- Dasari Chandrappa, Amin, District Court, Guntur, Madras.
- Gokul Mistri, Carpenter, Irrigation Department, United Provinces.
- Sat Narayan, Jemadar of Peons in the Foreign & Political Department, Government of India.
- Saiyed Mohaidin Sahib, Daffadar, Tinnevelly Collectorate, Madras.
- Ghulam Sarwar, Bindery Supervisor, Government Press, North-West Frontier Province.
- Chintadripet Velayudam, Jemadar of Peons, Office of the Board of Revenue, Land Revenue & Settlement, Madras.

=== Order of the Companions of Honour (CH) ===
- Annie Elizabeth Fredericka Horniman. For services to drama.

=== Kaisar-i-Hind Medal ===
First Class, for Public Services in India

- Anne, Lady Birkmyre, Bengal.
- Laura Margaret Hope, MB, BS, Medical Practitioner, Bengal.
- Edith Beatrice, Lady Keyes, Hyderabad, Deccan.
- Edith Tonkinson, MBE, Rangoon, Burma.
- The Reverend John Howard Allen, Head of the Australian Mission, Mau, United Provinces.
- M. R. Ry. Rao Bahadur Maruthu Chettiyar Subbiah Chettiyar Avargal, Merchant, Karaikudi, Ramnad District, Madras.
- Lieutenant-Colonel Samuel George Steele Haughton, OBE, Indian Medical Service, Officer Commanding, Indian Military Hospital, Quetta.
- Harold Hughes Hood, ex-Collector of Customs, Chairman of the Sind Red Cross Society, Sind, Bombay.
- Jal Sorabjee Jassawala, Weaving Master of the Bombay Company's Mills, Sholapur, Bombay.
- Rai Bahadur Amar Nath, MBE, Lahore, Punjab.

=== Royal Red Cross (RRC) ===
- Superintending Sister Ethel Madeline Gertrude Hirst, ARRC, Queen Alexandra's Royal Naval Nursing Service.

=== Honorary Chaplain to His Majesty ===
- The Reverend Alexander Ross Yeoman, CMG, , Deputy Chaplain-General to the Forces.

=== Air Force Cross (AFC) ===
Royal Air Force

- Squadron Leader Edward Reginald Openshaw.
- Flight Lieutenant Geoffrey Ivon Laurence Saye.

Royal Australian Air Force

- Flight Lieutenant Alan Moorhouse Charlesworth.

==== Bar to the Air Force Cross ====
Royal Air Force

- Squadron Leader Edwin Spencer Goodwin, AFC.

=== Air Force Medal (AFM) ===
- 364914 Sergeant Pilot Edgar Nelson Lewis, Royal Air Force.
- 588 Sergeant Pilot Francis William Collopy, Royal Australian Air Force.
