= Hake (surname) =

Hake, or Hakes, is a surname of English and Nordic origin, with Hakes being patronymic from Hake (Hakeson/Hakesonn). The origins of Hake(s) are said to derive from the Old Norse word haki, which is cognate with the word 'hook' and given originally to someone in the fishing trade.

The surname also derives from the Northern Germanic surname Haack, which is a name from Middle Low German hake (English: young fellow). The surname was first recorded in the eastern counties of England and originated under the pre-9th century Danish-Norwegian Viking influence.

== List of persons with the surname ==
- Alan Hake, co-founder of Must Destroy Records
- Alfred Egmont Hake (1849–1916), English author and social thinker
- Claes Hake (1945–2025), Swedish sculptor
- Edward Hake (fl. 1579), English satirist
- Herb Hake (1903–1980), American author, cartoonist, radio, and television personality
- Thomas Gordon Hake (1809–1895), English poet

== See also ==
- Hake, fish
