= Shircore =

Shircore is a surname. Notable people with the surname include:

- Herbert Michael Shircore (1874–?), Armenian businessman and politician
- Jenny Shircore (fl. 1998–2018), British make-up artist
