= Victoria Siddall =

British art dealer and activist

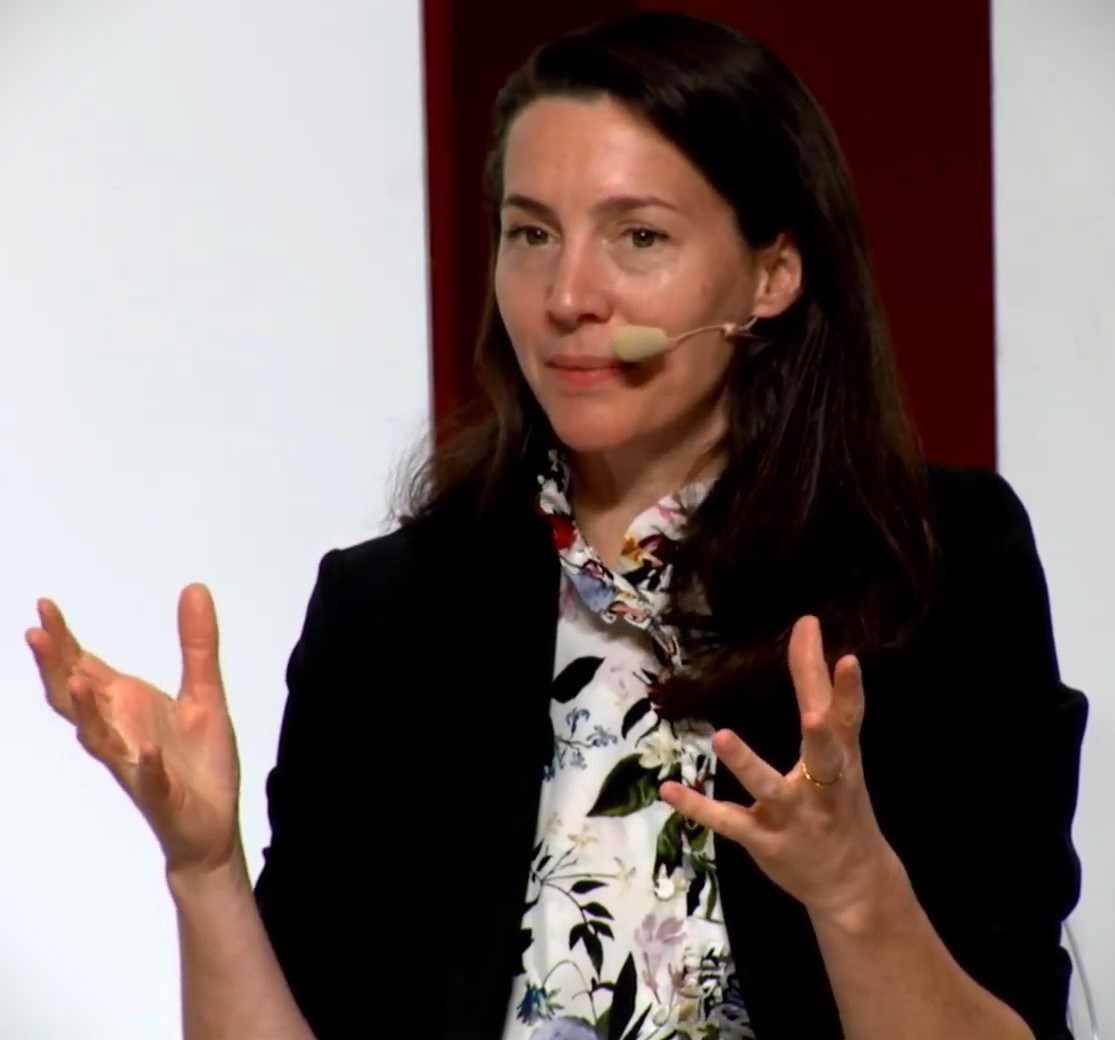
- Siddall in 2022
- Born: 1977 (age 48–49); Belfast, Northern Ireland, UK
- Education: University of Bristol
- Occupation: Gallerist
- Title: Director, National Portrait Gallery
- Term: 2024–
- Predecessor: Nicholas Cullinan
- Partner: François Chantala
- Children: 1

Victoria Siddall (born 1977) is a British gallerist, and the director of the National Portrait Gallery in London. She was appointed in August 2024. She was inaugural director of the Frieze Masters art fair, and a co-founder of environmental campaign groups the Gallery Climate Coalition and Murmur.

== Early life ==
Siddall was born in 1977 in Belfast, Northern Ireland, and as her father was in the army, the family lived in several countries. She was privately educated, attending boarding school from the age of eight.

Siddall earned a bachelor's degree in English and philosophy from the University of Bristol.

== Career ==
After university, Siddall worked for British auction house Christie's for over three years. In 2004, she joined London's Frieze Art Fair, and in 2012 was the founding director of Frieze Masters art fair, before becoming Global Director, overseeing all of Frieze's art fair operations, in London and New York, from 2014, and launching Frieze Seoul in 2022.

She joined the trustee board of Studio Voltaire, London, in 2012, and served as chair of the board of trustees between 2012 and 2024.

In August 2024 she was appointed the thirteenth director of London's National Portrait Gallery, the first woman to be appointed to the role in the gallery's 168-year history. She had been a trustee from July 2023 to August 2024. She was appointed under the government of Keir Starmer in late 2024, succeeding interim director Michael Elliott, who was appointed after Nicholas Cullinan left in June to become director of the British Museum.

== Environmental campaigning ==
In October 2020, Siddall co-founded the Gallery Climate Coalition. In 2024, Siddall co-founded the green campaign group Murmur, that encourages arts and music organisations to reduce their carbon footprint and 'cut ties' with fossil fuel companies.

With Thomas Dane and Christie's, Siddall launched Artists for ClientEarth in 2021 which raised over $6.5 million for the environmental charity through donations of works by artists like Cecily Brown, Rashid Johnson, Xie Nanxing, and Beatriz Milhazes.

== Personal life ==
Siddall lives in Lambeth in South London, with her long-term partner François Chantala and their daughter. They met in 2000 while they were both working at Christie's. Chantala is a gallerist from Limoges, France, and a director at Thomas Dane in London.
