= James Milner (art historian) =

British art executive and art historian

James Donald Milner FSA (20 November 1874 – 15 August 1927) was a British art executive who served as director of the National Portrait Gallery, London from 1916 until his death in 1927.

== Life ==
Milner joined the Gallery around 1893 as a Clerk. He learned about English portraits by visiting country houses, as an assistant to George Scharf. His appointment reflected his record as an administrator, his familiarity with the Gallery's traditions, and the acceptability to many of the trustees of his art historical background.

== Works ==
- Catalogue of portraits of botanists exhibited in the museums of the Royal Botanic Gardens (1906)

Some portraits by Milner are held by the National Portrait Gallery.
