= James de Graaff-Hunter =

British-born geodesist and surveyor (1881–1967)

James de Graaff-Hunter CIE FRS (Note: His name has also been misspelled in published sources as De Graff-Hunter or De Graaf-Hunter.) (11 September 1881 – 3 February 1967) was a British geodesist who served as director of Survey of India's Geodetic Branch from 1928 to 1932, and as President of the International Association of Geodesy from 1954 to 1957.

== Early life and education ==
James de Graaff-Hunter was born in Chester as the youngest of three sons on 11 September 1881. His father was James G. M. Hunter, who was a seed merchant, and his mother, Sarah J. née Pierrepont, was a pianist. De Graaff-Hunter was christened after his godfather, Herr de Graaff, a bulb grower and friend of his father. Throughout his life, he stylized his name as both J. de Graaff Hunter and J. de Graaff-Hunter (with a hyphen).

He was educated at King's School, Chester, and later matriculated at Pembroke College, Cambridge in 1900 with an £80 entrance scholarship to study mathematics. From Cambridge he received a B.A. in 1903, an M.A. in 1907, and a Sc.D. in 1920.

== Career ==
After leaving Cambridge, de Graaff-Hunter worked as a mathematics master at the Harrow School for two months in 1904, before working as an advisor to Lord Kelvin in 1905 and 1905. He worked for the National Physical Laboratory from 1905 until he was appointed to the Survey of India in 1907.

While working for the Survey of India's Great Trigonometrical Survey, in 1908, de Graff-Hunter accompanied G. P. Lenox-Conyngham on a pendulum-swinging tour in South India to observe the intensity of gravity in different locations. In 1910, de Graaff-Hunter replaced John Eccles as the mathematician in charge of the Great Trigonometrical Survey computing office. After assuming office, he completed his first major scientific work in India—Professional Paper 14 (1913) described the connection of atmospheric refraction to observing the height of mountains. He later returned to southern India in 1916 and 1917 for field studies in secondary triangulation using observing towers he had designed and made. Subsequent work, including Professional Paper 16 (1918) was also on the topic of triangulation—the paper dealt with how to adapt the results of triangulation computations to a new spheroid without completely recalculating, and also listed rules on common triangulation errors.

In 1917, he joined the army and served for two years as a captain in Mesopotamia and Persia. There, he focused on triangulation of the Kirkuk and Kurdistan regions. He returned to India in 1919 and studied the geoid based on his earlier observations.

In 1928, he was appointed Director of the Geodetic Branch of the Survey of India, a position similar to the former Superintendent of the Trigonometrical Survey title. He retired in 1932, and received the Companion of the Order of the Indian Empire honor in 1933, and was elected Fellow of the Royal Society in 1935. From 1936 to 1838, he continued his geodetic studies from England, supported by a Leverhulme Research Fellowship

When World War II broke out in 1939, he offered himself to the Survey of India's war efforts, but was not needed. In 1941, the Government of India accepted his offer and he boarded the SS Zamzam in New York towards Cape Town. When the ship was attacked, he was put on a supply ship and shipped to a German internment camp. He was moved to multiple different stalags, before being released in 1942. He continued work as a surveyor in India until 1946.

His "Model Earth" proposed through multiple publications in the late 1950s and into the 1960s was at the time a novel new model, and it remains an important model in the field of geodesy. The model moved landmasses around without adding or destroying mass to smooth out the surface of the Earth. This work, as well as much of his other studies, builds off the work of George Gabriel Stokes.

He moved to Australia in 1962, and, aged 85, he died in his Mosman, New South Wales home on 3 February 1967.
