= Henry Hake =

Henry Mendelssohn Hake
- Born: 30 January 1892; London, England
- Died: 4 April 1951 (aged 59); London, England
- Education: Westminster School; Trinity College, Cambridge
- Occupation: Curator
- Years active: 1914–1915; 1920–1951
- Relatives: Thomas Gordon Hake (grandfather)
- Awards: Knight Bachelor; Order of the British Empire; Order of Saint John
- Military career
- Allegiance: United Kingdom
- Branch: British Army
- Service years: 1915–1920
- Rank: Lieutenant
- Unit: Cambridgeshire Regiment
- Conflicts: World War I
- Awards: Croix de guerre (France)

Sir Henry Mendelssohn Hake CBE FSA FRHistS (30 January 1892 – 4 April 1951) was a British museum curator who was Director of the National Portrait Gallery, London, from 1927 until his death.

== Early life and education ==
He was the son of Henry Wilson Hake, Ph.D., and a grandson of Thomas Gordon Hake, a physician, poet, and friend of Dante Gabriel Rossetti, George Borrow, and others. Hake was born in London, and educated at Westminster School and Trinity College, Cambridge. On 2 June 1914, he became an assistant in the Department of Prints and Drawings at the British Museum.

== Military service ==
A year after the outbreak of the First World War, on 22 August 1915, Hake was commissioned as a second lieutenant in the Cambridgeshire Regiment, and was promoted to the temporary rank of lieutenant on 1 February 1916.

On 9 February 1917, he was seconded for special duty, and graded for the purposes of pay as a staff lieutenant (3rd class). On 4 June, his pay grade was raised to that of staff lieutenant (2nd class), and on 29 August he was promoted to lieutenant, with seniority from 1 June 1916. He finally returned to the Cambridgeshire Regiment on 29 July 1919.

On 24 October 1919, he received permission to wear the Croix de guerre awarded to him by France. He resigned his commission on 9 October 1920.

== Later career ==
Hake returned to the British Museum, remaining there until he was appointed as Director, Keeper and Secretary of the National Portrait Gallery on 1 December 1927.

He was made a Commander of the Order of the British Empire in the King's Birthday Honours of June 1933, and an Officer of the Order of Saint John on 23 December 1942. Hake was made a Knight Bachelor in the 1947 New Years Honours.

His portrait is held by the National Portrait Gallery.

Hake had married Patricia Robertson in 1920, he died at his home in London on 4 April 1951, aged 59.
