= 1894 Ystradyfodwg Urban District Council election =

Local election in Wales

The 1894 Ystradyfodwg Urban District Council election was held in December 1894 and was the first election to the district council of Ystradyfodwg in the Rhondda Valley, Glamorgan, Wales. Three members were elected from each ward making a total of fifteen members on the authority. It was followed by the 1896 election.

Ystradyfodwg Urban District Council was renamed Rhondda Urban District Council in 1897.

== Aggregate results ==
Ystradyfodwg Urban District Council election, 1894
Party	Seats	Gains	Losses	Net gain/loss	Seats %	Votes %	Votes	+/−
Liberal	7							
Conservative	5							
Independent Labour	2							
Independent	1							

== Ward No.1 ==
Ward No.1
Party	Candidate	Votes	%	±%
Conservative	Morgan Llewellyn	720		
Liberal	William Morgan	637		
Liberal	William Jones	593		

== Ward No.2 ==
Ward No.2
Party	Candidate	Votes	%	±%
Liberal	William Jenkins	957		
Conservative	Rev William Lewis	855		
Liberal	William Thomas	723		

== Ward No.3 ==
Ward No.3
Party	Candidate	Votes	%	±%
Conservative	John Thomas	652		
Liberal	Rhys S. Griffiths	574		
Labour	Ebenezer Davies	533		

== Ward No.4 ==
Ward No.4
Party	Candidate	Votes	%	±%
Liberal	Thomas Griffiths	1,108		
Conservative	John D. Williams	907		
Conservative	L.P. Griffiths	771		

== Ward No.5 ==
Ward No.5
Party	Candidate	Votes	%	±%
	W.H. Mathias	1,003		
Labour	Daniel Evans	927		
Liberal	Morris Morris	757		
