= John Strachan (engineer) =

British engineer

John Strachan CMG
- Born: 1878
- Died: 30 January 1934 (aged 56); Port of Spain
- Occupation: Civil engineer
- Spouse: Agnes K. Law
- Children: 1 son and 2 daughters

John Strachan CMG (1878 – 30 January 1934) was a British civil engineer who spent his career in Ceylon and the Federated Malay States.

== Early life ==
Born in 1878, John Strachan was the son of John Strachan, civil engineer, who followed his father into the engineering profession, and received his training whilst working on railway and dock works.

== Career ==
In 1911, he went to Ceylon to join the Public Works Department, first as assistant chief engineer and later as chief engineer, of the Colombo Lake Development Scheme, and also served as assistant director of the Public Works Department.

In 1912, he was appointed assistant director, and later director, of the Public Works Department of the Federated Malay States. In 1923, he returned to Ceylon as director of the Public Works Department, and became a member of the Legislative Council, and Chairman of the Electrical Public Works Advisory.

In 1927, he returned to the Federated Malay States to take up the post of General Manager and Chief Engineer of the Federated Malay States Railways. The appointment caused some surprise because he had no experience of railway administration, although he was used to managing large departments, and had the engineering knowledge which was required at a time when Federated Malay States Railways was involved in major expansion of its network.

During his five-year administration, Strachan was associated with several major projects. At the beginning of his administration, the railways in Perak, Pahang and Kelantan suffered widespread damage due to unprecedented flooding, and he had to carry out extensive repair works. In the same year, he oversaw the completion of the East Coast Line which passed through many hundreds of miles of jungle territory. Other works with which he was involved include redirecting the Singapore rail line around the western suburbs, and the construction of a new railway station near the docks in 1932, and the renewal of the Johore railway lease.

In addition, he had to manage the effects of the economic depression at the beginning of the 1930s when the revenues of the Federated Malay States Railways, which earned $23 million in 1929, fell by 60%. Strachan was obliged to reduce costs by laying off staff and scaling back its construction programme.

Whilst head of Federated Malay States Railways, he also served as a member of the Federal Council from 1927 to 1930, and was President of the Engineering Association of Malaya, and the Malayan branch of the Institute of Civil Engineers. He was also a member of the Institute of Civil Engineers, the Institute of Transport, and the Institute of Structural Engineers.

In 1932, he resigned when he was appointed Director of Transport in Trinidad to investigate the financial losses of Trinidad railways.

== Personal life and death ==
Strachan died on 30 January 1934 in Port of Spain, Trinidad, after a brief illness, aged 56. He was married to Agnes K. Law, and they had one son and two daughters.

== Honours and legacy ==
Strachan was appointed CMG in the 1933 King's Birthday Honours. Strachan Road (3°11′0″N 101°41′7″E), behind Sentul Komuter station in Kuala Lumpur was named after him.
