= Russell England =

British-born civil servant, farmer and politician

Sir Russell England CBE JP

Member of the Legislative Council
- In office 1961–1965

Personal details
- Born: 1 May 1899; London, United Kingdom
- Died: 12 January 1970 (aged 70); Botswana

Sir Russell England CBE JP (1 May 1899 – 12 January 1970) was a British-born civil servant, farmer and politician in the Bechuanaland Protectorate. A leader of the European community, he served as a member of the Legislative Council of the Bechuanaland Protectorate from 1961 to 1965.

== Biography ==
England was born in Fulham, London in 1899, the son of Captain Russell England (1833–1924) and Amy Eulalia Venn (1874–1954). He emigrated to South Africa in 1915 and became a lecturer at an agricultural college in Bloemfontein. He subsequently moved to Bechuanaland Protectorate, where he joined the agriculture department. He was awarded an MBE in the 1933 Birthday Honours for his work as a dairy expert and inspector. As a Chief Agricultural Officer, he was awarded an OBE in the 1943 New Year Honours. He later became Director of Agriculture, before leaving the civil service after purchasing farms in Tati and near Lobatse. He also bought other businesses in Lobatse and Gaborone, becoming one of the wealthiest men in the territory.

During the 1950s England entered politics, becoming a member and then chairman of the European Advisory Council and co-chair of the Joint Advisory Council. He also became a justice of the peace, and was awarded a CBE in the 1957 Birthday Honours. In 1958 he submitted a motion calling for a Legislative Council for the territory, and during a visit to the territory by British Prime Minister Harold Macmillan in 1960, England made a speech in which he requested that Bechuanaland not be merged into either Rhodesia or South Africa.

In 1961 a Legislative Council was established, with England becoming one of its members. He was also appointed of the Executive Council as the member responsible for livestock development. The following year he proposed to Seretse Khama that they form a political party together, with the two acting as joint leaders. However, the British Resident Commissioner Peter Fawcus advised it may compromise Khama's position as a leader of the African community. Khama subsequently formed and became leader of the Botswana Democratic Party.

England was knighted in the 1965 Birthday Honours. In January 1970 he was stabbed to death by Koos Ockhuizen and Wilson Banda during a burglary at his farm. Ockhuizen and Banda were subsequently sentenced to death and executed in August.
