= Rhondda Urban District Council =

Former Welsh urban district council

Rhondda Urban District Council was a local authority in Glamorgan, Wales. It was created in 1894 as a result of the 1894 Local Government of England and Wales Act and the 1894 election saw the election of the first members of the authority, initially known as the Ystradyfodwg Urban District Council. The Council existed until 1973 and replaced the Ystradyfodwg Local Board of Health which had functioned since the 1870s. . Initially, the Council had fifteen members but this was increased to twenty in 1906, as a result of the increase in population. There were five wards.

The first councillors were elected at the 1894 election. From the outset there was a strong representation on the Council of middle-class nonconformist liberals, who were typical of the new elite who rose to prominence in Wales in the late-Victorian and Edwardian periods.

Following the inaugural elections there were comparatively few contests during the next few years.

In the years leading up to the First World War, representatives of the Labour Party began to gain ground.

In 1974 the authority was abolished, and replaced by the Rhondda Borough Council which, in turn, was subsumed into the unitary authority of Rhondda Cynon Taf in 1996.

== 1896 Rhondda Urban District Council election ==
This was the second election to the authority, originally known as the Ystradyfodwg Urban District Council. The initial election was held in 1894 and this election was followed by the 1897 election.

All the wards were uncontested. In four wards, members returned at the previous election were unopposed, while in Ward No.3, the Labour member, Ebenezer Davies, checkweigher at the Clydach Vale Colliery did not seek re-election. The Rhondda parliamentary constituency was represented by the Lib-Lab MP, William Abraham, and there was significant tension at local level between the official Liberal Association and the trade unions, notably the miners.

=== Ward Results ===
==== Ward No.1 ====
Ward No.1
Party	Candidate	Votes	%	±%
Liberal	William Jones*	Unopposed		

==== Ward No.2 ====
Ward No.2
Party	Candidate	Votes	%	±%
Liberal	William Thomas*	Unopposed		

==== Ward No.3 ====
Ward No.3
Party	Candidate	Votes	%	±%
Liberal	David Williams	Unopposed		

==== Ward No.4 ====
Ward No.4
Party	Candidate	Votes	%	±%
Conservative	L.P. Griffiths*	Unopposed		

==== Ward No.5 ====
Ward No.5
Party	Candidate	Votes	%	±%
Liberal	Morris Morris*	Unopposed		

== Bibliography ==
- Parry, Jon (1989). "Labour Leaders and Local Politics 1888-1902: The Example of Aberdare". Welsh History Review. 14 (3): 399–416.

== See also ==
- 1894 Ystradyfodwg Urban District Council election
- 1896 Ystradyfodwg Urban District Council election
