= Nicholas Cullinan =

Director of the British Museum

Robert Nicholas Cullinan OBE (born 29 December 1977) is a British art historian and curator. In January 2015, he was appointed the 12th director of the National Portrait Gallery in London, a post he began several months later. It was announced in March 2024 that he had been appointed director of the British Museum.

== Early life and education ==
Cullinan was born in December 1977 in Connecticut, United States, to British parents. He moved to Britain aged four or five, and grew up in Hebden Bridge, West Yorkshire, England. He was home-schooled. He received his BA, MA, and PhD in art history from The Courtauld Institute of Art in London. Between 2001 and 2003, while a student, he worked as a visitor services assistant at the National Portrait Gallery, where he was later appointed director in 2015. He completed his PhD in 2010 with a doctoral thesis titled "Past imperfect: arte povera in Italy, 1963-1972" or "The Archeology of Knowledge: Excavating Arte Povera". His doctoral supervisor was Professor Sarah Wilson.

== Personal life ==
Cullinan is married to Mattias Vendelmans, a Belgian art dealer and founder in 2023 of the Vendelmans gallery in London. He lives in Oval, London, and Margate in Kent.

== Career ==
From 2006 to 2007, he held the Hilla Rebay International Fellowship at Guggenheim Museum Bilbao, Solomon R. Guggenheim Museum, and Peggy Guggenheim Collection. From 2007 to 2013 he was curator of international modern art at Tate Modern. He then joined the Metropolitan Museum of Art in New York City as its curator of modern and contemporary art. In 2014, he co-curated an exhibition of Henri Matisse's cut-outs at Tate Modern with Sir Nicholas Serota. The exhibition attracted more than 500,000 visitors.

Cullinan was appointed Officer of the Order of the British Empire (OBE) in the 2024 New Year Honours for services to art. He is a trustee of the Chatsworth House Trust.
