= National Portrait Gallery, London =

Art gallery in London, England

National Portrait Gallery

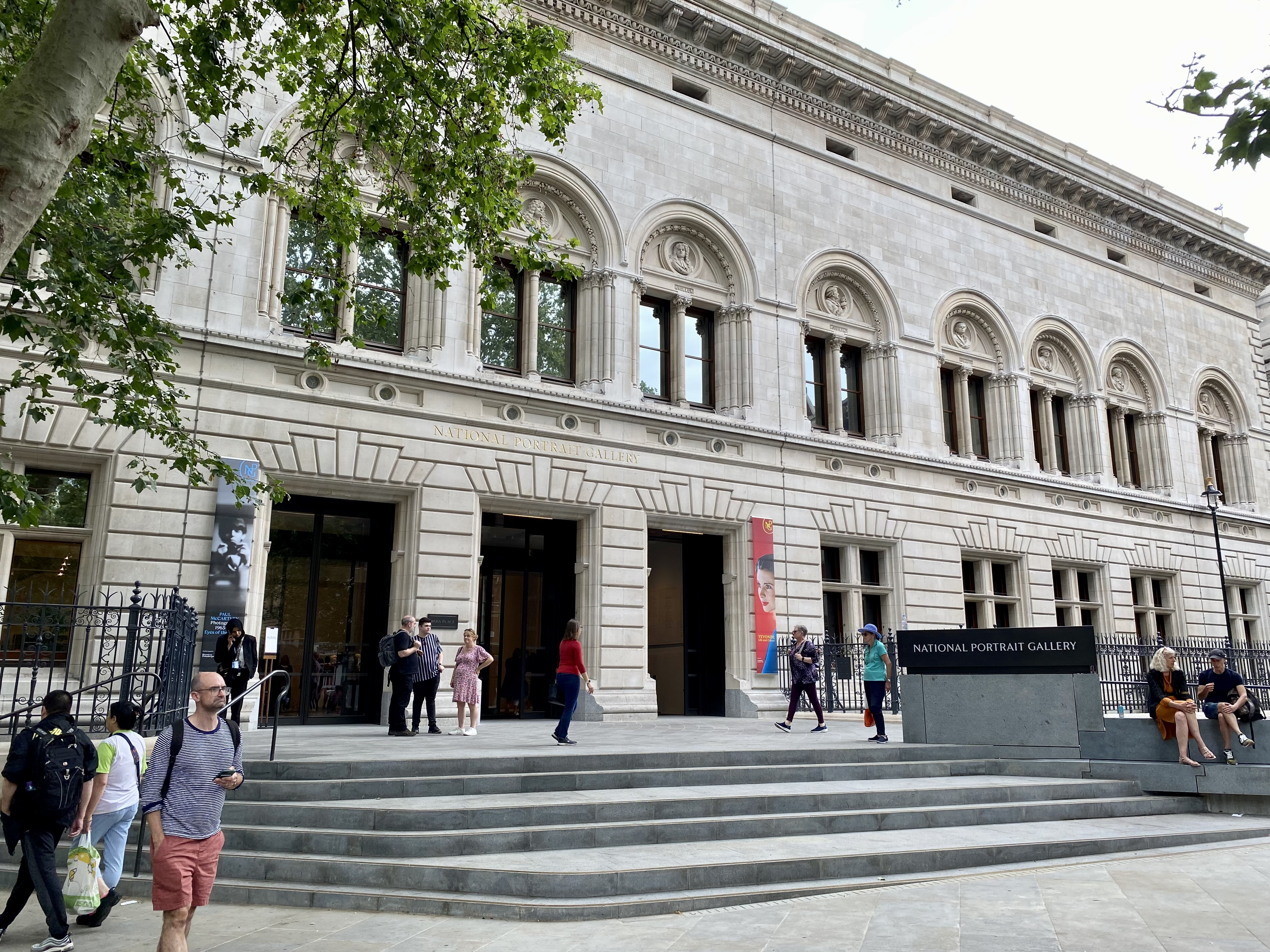
- The main entrance in June 2023
- Established: 1856; 170 years ago
- Location: St Martin's Place, London, WC2H 0HE, United Kingdom
- Coordinates: 51.5094°N 0.1281°W
- Collection size: 195,000 portraits
- Visitors: 1,523,447
- Director: Victoria Siddall
- Public transit access: Charing Cross; Charing Cross; Leicester Square; Embankment
- Website: npg.org.uk

The National Portrait Gallery (NPG) is an art gallery in London that houses a collection of portraits of historically important and famous British people. When it opened in 1856, it was arguably the first national public gallery in the world that was dedicated to portraits.

The gallery moved in 1896 to its current site at St Martin's Place, off Trafalgar Square, and adjoining the National Gallery. The National Portrait Gallery also has regional outposts at Beningbrough Hall in Yorkshire and Montacute House in Somerset. It is unconnected to the Scottish National Portrait Gallery in Edinburgh, with which its remit overlaps. The gallery is a non-departmental public body sponsored by the Department for Digital, Culture, Media and Sport.

== Collection ==
The Chandos portrait of William Shakespeare, the first painting to enter the gallery's collection

The gallery houses portraits of historically important and famous British people, selected on the basis of the significance of the sitter, not that of the artist. The collection includes photographs and caricatures as well as paintings, drawings and sculpture. One of its best-known images is the Chandos portrait, the most famous portrait of William Shakespeare although there is some uncertainty about whether the painting actually is of the playwright.

Not all of the portraits are exceptional artistically, although there are self-portraits by William Hogarth, Sir Joshua Reynolds and other British artists of note. Some, such as the group portrait of the participants in the Somerset House Conference of 1604, are important historical documents in their own right. Often, the curiosity value is greater than the artistic worth of a work, as in the case of the anamorphic portrait of Edward VI by William Scrots, Patrick Branwell Brontë's painting of his sisters Charlotte, Emily and Anne, or a sculpture of Queen Victoria and Prince Albert in medieval costume. Portraits of living figures were allowed from 1969. In addition to its permanent galleries of historical portraits, the National Portrait Gallery exhibits a rapidly changing selection of contemporary work, stages exhibitions of portrait art by individual artists and hosts the annual BP Portrait Prize competition.

== History and buildings ==
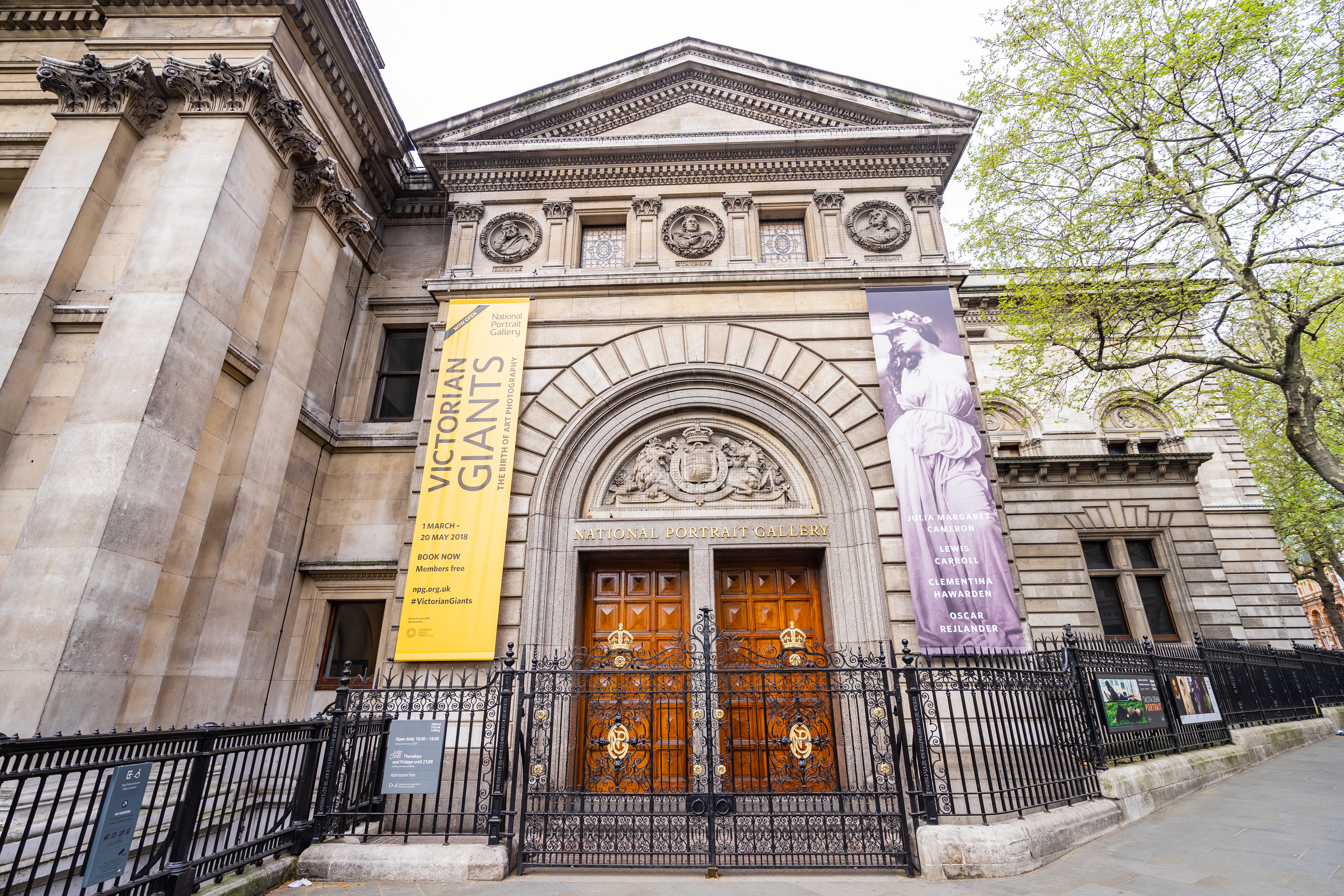
The gallery's former main entrance in 2018

The locations of the National Portrait Gallery and its regional outposts, past and present

The three people largely responsible for the founding of the National Portrait Gallery are commemorated with busts over the former main entrance on St Martin's Place. At the centre is Philip Stanhope, 5th Earl Stanhope, flanked to his left and right by his supporters Thomas Babington Macaulay, 1st Baron Macaulay, and Thomas Carlyle. It was Stanhope who, in 1846 as a Member of Parliament, first proposed the idea of a National Portrait Gallery. It was not until his third attempt, in 1856, this time from the House of Lords, that the proposal was accepted. With Queen Victoria's approval, the House of Commons set aside a sum of £2000 to establish the gallery. As well as Stanhope and Macaulay, the founder trustees included Benjamin Disraeli and Lord Ellesmere. It was the latter who donated the Chandos portrait to the nation as the gallery's first portrait. Carlyle became a trustee after the death of Ellesmere in 1857.

For the first 40 years, the gallery was housed in various locations in London. The first 13 years were spent at 29 Great George Street, Westminster. There, the collection increased in size from 57 to 208 items, and the number of visitors from 5,300 to 34,500. In 1869, the collection moved to Exhibition Road and buildings managed by the Royal Horticultural Society. Following a fire in those buildings, the collection was moved in 1885, this time to the Bethnal Green Museum. This location was ultimately unsuitable due to its distance from the West End, condensation and lack of waterproofing. Following calls for a new location to be found, the government accepted an offer of funds from the philanthropist William Henry Alexander. Alexander donated £60,000 followed by another £20,000, and also chose the architect, Ewan Christian. The government provided the new site on St Martin's Place, adjacent to the National Gallery, and £16,000. The buildings, faced in Portland stone, were constructed by Shillitoe & Son. Both the architect, Ewan Christian, and the gallery's first director, George Scharf, died shortly before the new building was completed. The gallery opened at its new location on 4 April 1896. The first extension, in 1933, was funded by Lord Duveen, and resulted in the wing by the architect Sir Richard Allison on a site previously occupied by St George's Barracks running along Orange Street.

In February 1909, a murder–suicide took place in a gallery known as the "Arctic Room". In an apparently planned attack, John Tempest Dawson, aged 70, shot his 58-year-old wife, Nannie Caskie, from behind with a revolver, then shot himself in the mouth, dying instantly. His wife died in hospital several hours later. Both were American nationals who had lived in Hove for around 10 years. Evidence at the inquest suggested that Dawson, a wealthy and well-travelled man, was suffering from a persecutory delusion. The incident came to public attention in 2010 when the Gallery's archive was put on-line as this included a personal account of the event by James Donald Milner, then the Assistant Director of the Gallery.

The collections of the National Portrait Gallery were stored at Mentmore Towers in Buckinghamshire during the Second World War, along with pieces from the Royal Collection and paintings from Speaker's House in the Palace of Westminster.

=== Early 21st century ===
The second extension was funded by Sir Christopher Ondaatje and a £12m Heritage Lottery Fund grant, and was designed by the London-based architects Edward Jones and Jeremy Dixon. The Ondaatje Wing opened in 2000 and occupies a narrow space of land between the two 19th-century buildings of the National Gallery and the National Portrait Gallery, and is notable for its immense, two-storey escalator which takes visitors to the earliest part of the collection, the Tudor portraits.

In January 2008, the Gallery received its largest single donation to date, a £5m gift from the US billionaire Randy Lerner.

In January 2012, Catherine, Duchess of Cambridge, announced the National Portrait Gallery as one of her official patronages. Her portrait was unveiled in January 2013. The gallery holds nearly 20 portraits of Harriet Martineau and her brother James Martineau, whose great-nephew Francis Martineau Lupton was the Duchess's great-great-grandfather.

Bodelwyddan Castle's partnership with the National Portrait Gallery came to an end in 2017 after its funding was cut by Denbighshire County Council.

In June 2017 it was announced that the NPG has been awarded funding of £9.4 million from the Heritage Lottery Fund towards its major transformation programme Inspiring People, the Gallery's biggest ever development. The Gallery had already raised over £7m of its £35.5m target. The building works were scheduled to start in 2020.

In October 2019, a group of semi-naked environmental campaigners were drenched in fake oil, in the Ondaatje Wing main hall, as part of a protest against BP's sponsorship of a collection of pieces in the gallery. The protest performance piece, which was entitled Crude Truth, involved a clothed protester reciting a monologue in which they called upon arts organisations to sever ties with companies "funding extinction". Three activists covered in black liquid lay down for about five minutes on a plastic sheet before standing up again, wiping themselves down with towels, and cleaning up after themselves. The action, which was applauded by onlookers, passed uninterrupted.

=== Closure and refurbishment in 2020–2023 ===
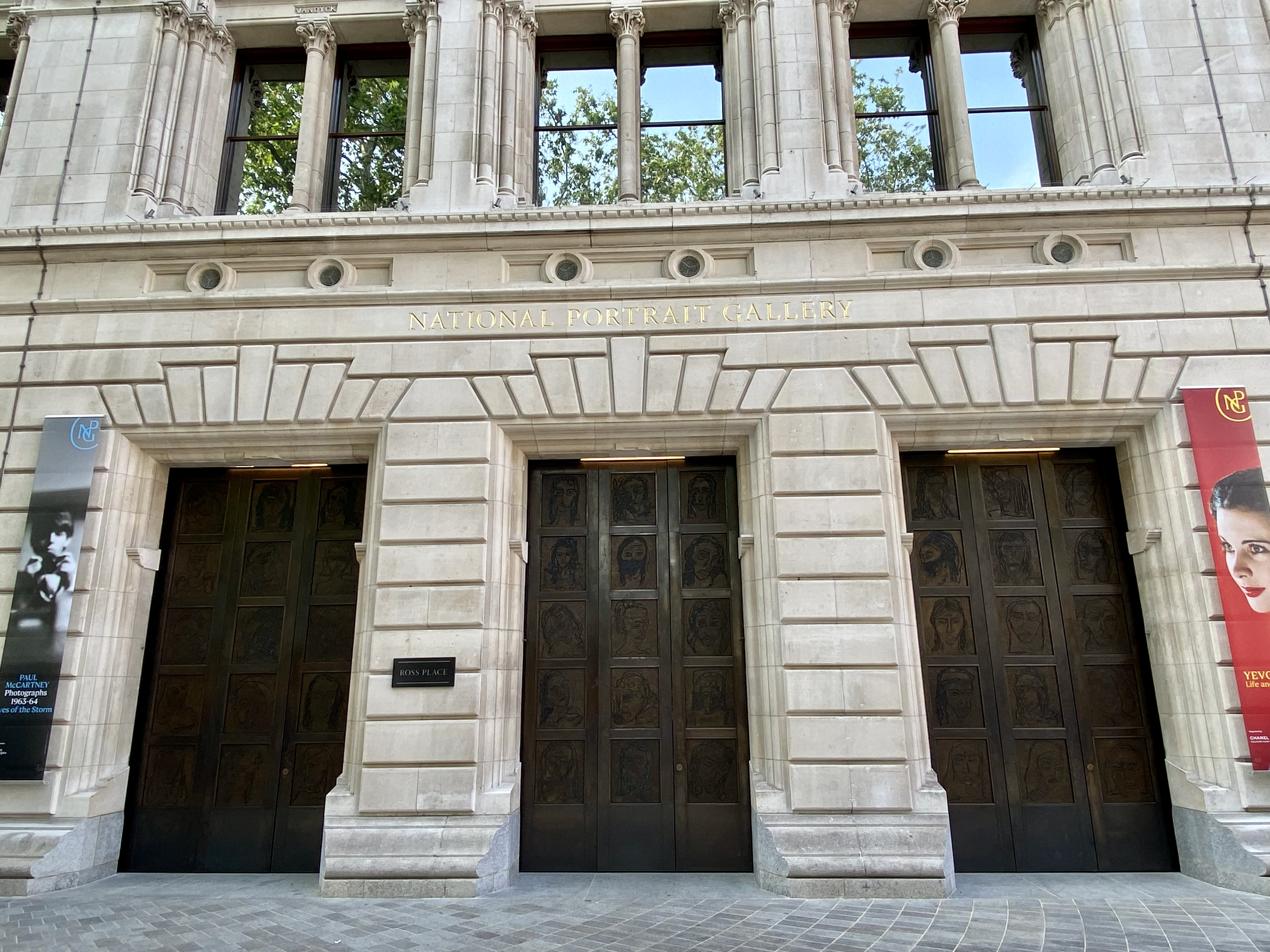
Tracey Emin's The Doors

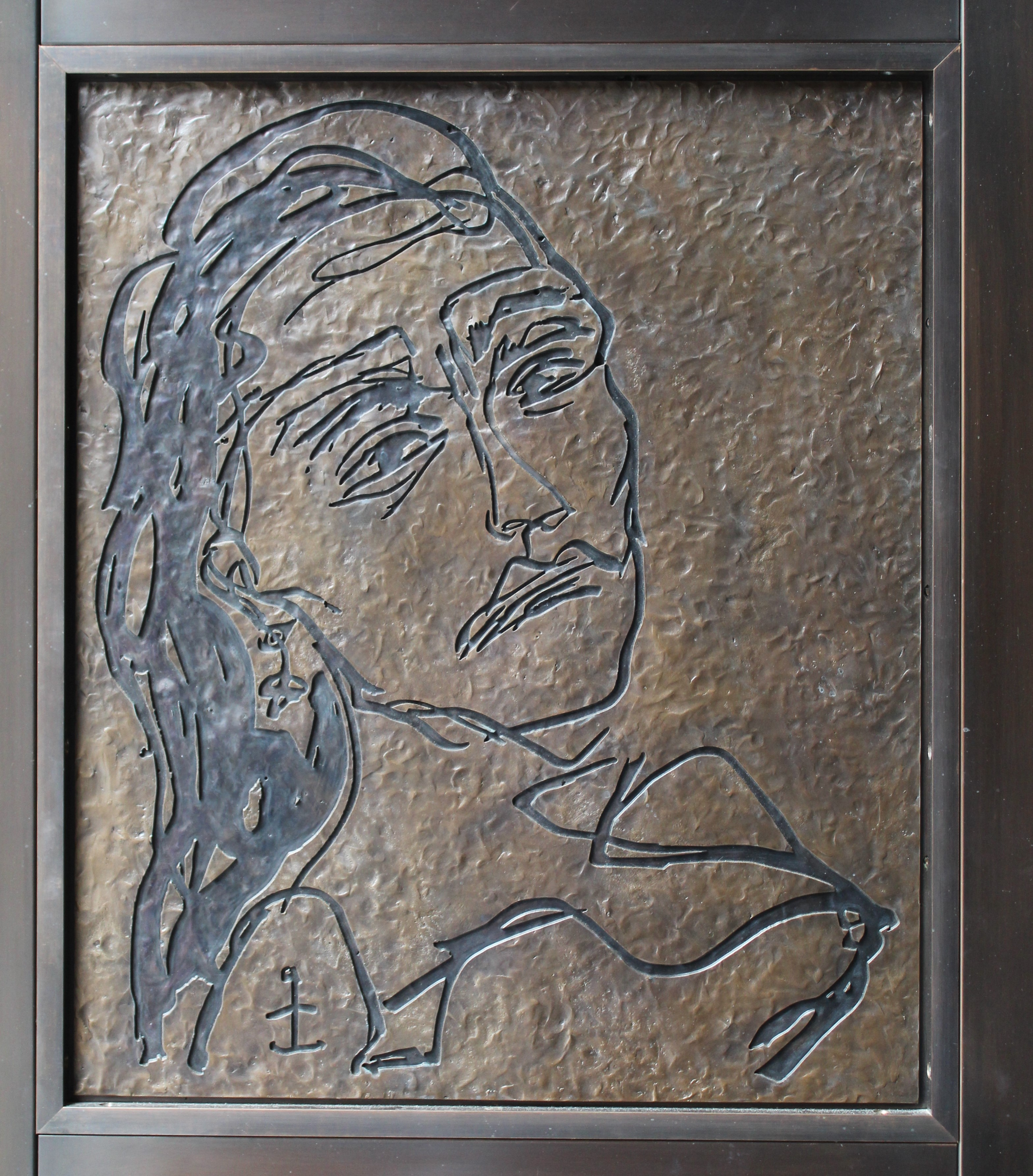
National Portrait Gallery door panel by Tracey Emin

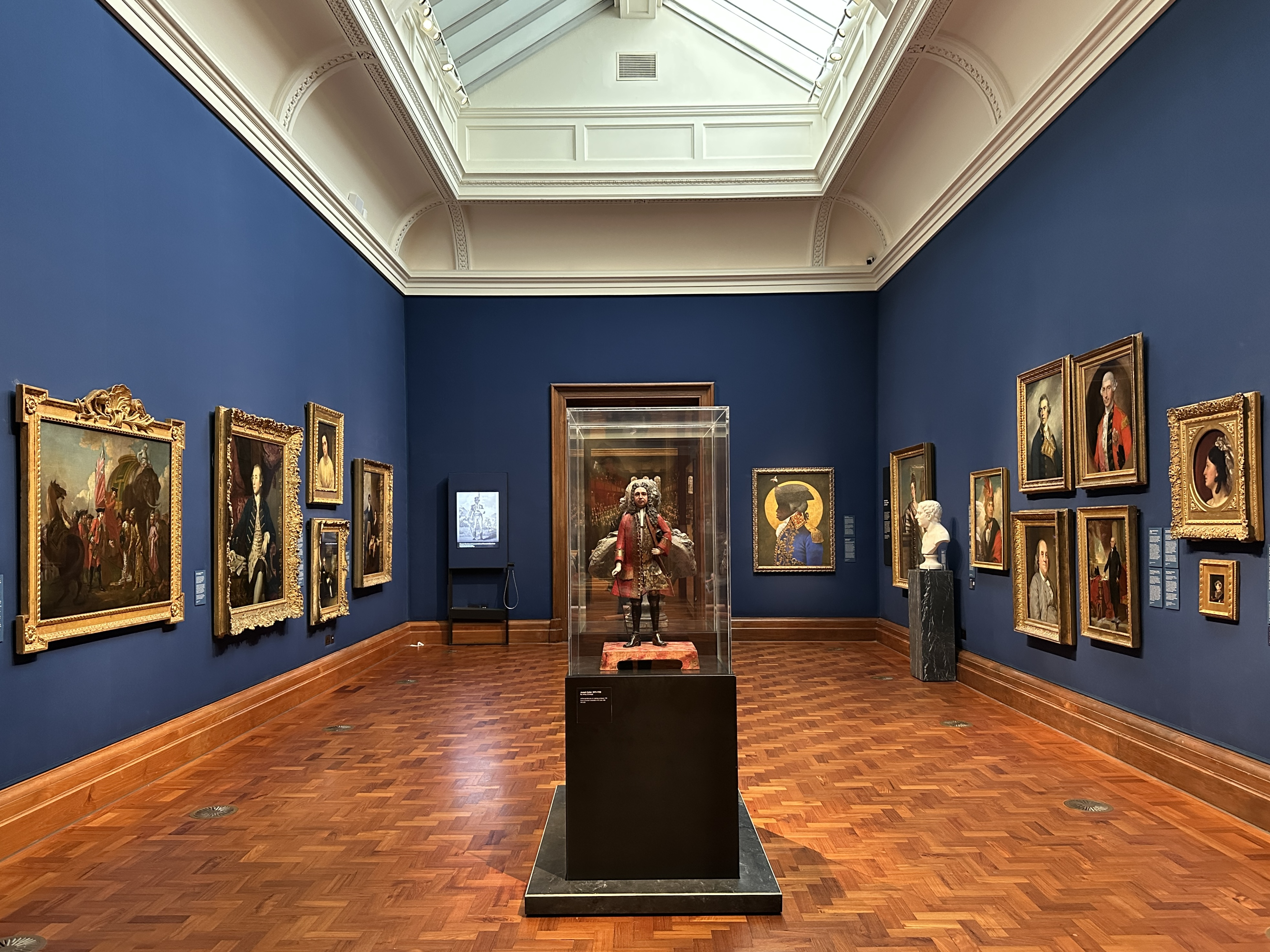
Artwork on Floor 3

A major programme of refurbishment with the project name of "Inspiring People" led to the gallery's closure from 2020 to 2023. Some galleries closed by late May 2020, with full closure by July 2020. There were a number of planned exhibitions and collaborations around the UK to display parts of the collection while the gallery was closed. These included exhibitions starting at the York Art Gallery in 2021, the Holburne Museum, Bath (Tudor portraits, 2022), and museums in Liverpool, Newcastle, Coventry and Edinburgh, which later toured to other venues. Other partners included the National Trust, the National Maritime Museum and the National Gallery. In London, the shops and restaurants closed, but the Heinz Archive and Library remained open. Another programme, called "Coming Home", loaned portraits of individual people to museums in their home towns. Exhibitions also travelled to Japan, Australia and the United States.

The "Inspiring People" project "comprises a comprehensive redisplay of the Collection from the Tudors to now, combined with a complete refurbishment of the building, the creation of new public spaces, a more welcoming visitor entrance and public forecourt, and a new state of the art Learning Centre". The East Wing returned to being gallery space, with its own new street entrance.

The refurbishment, which cost £41 million, was designed by the architect Jamie Fobert and Purcell with Gilbert-Ash as the main contractor. It added new galleries, learning spaces, restaurants and a public forecourt. The gallery's main entrance was moved and features three new 4 m (13 ft) bronze doors which carry 45 portraits of un-named women, drawn by Tracey Emin.

In 2022, the gallery accepted a £10 million gift from the Blavatnik Family Foundation, established by the entrepreneur Sir Len Blavatnik. The new first-floor Blavatnik Wing comprises nine galleries hosting more than one hundred years of British portraits and is part of the gallery's Inspiring People project. The Gallery stated that the gift was the most significant in its history.

=== 2023 reopening ===
The Gallery was reopened by the Princess of Wales on 20 June 2023 and she met Sir Paul McCartney whose photography exhibition was the first major show in the new space. She also viewed the Portrait of Omai by Sir Joshua Reynolds, which the gallery had just acquired jointly with the Getty Museum. The gallery reopened to the public on 22 June. In 2024 the Inspiring People rebuild was short-listed for the RIBA Stirling Prize.

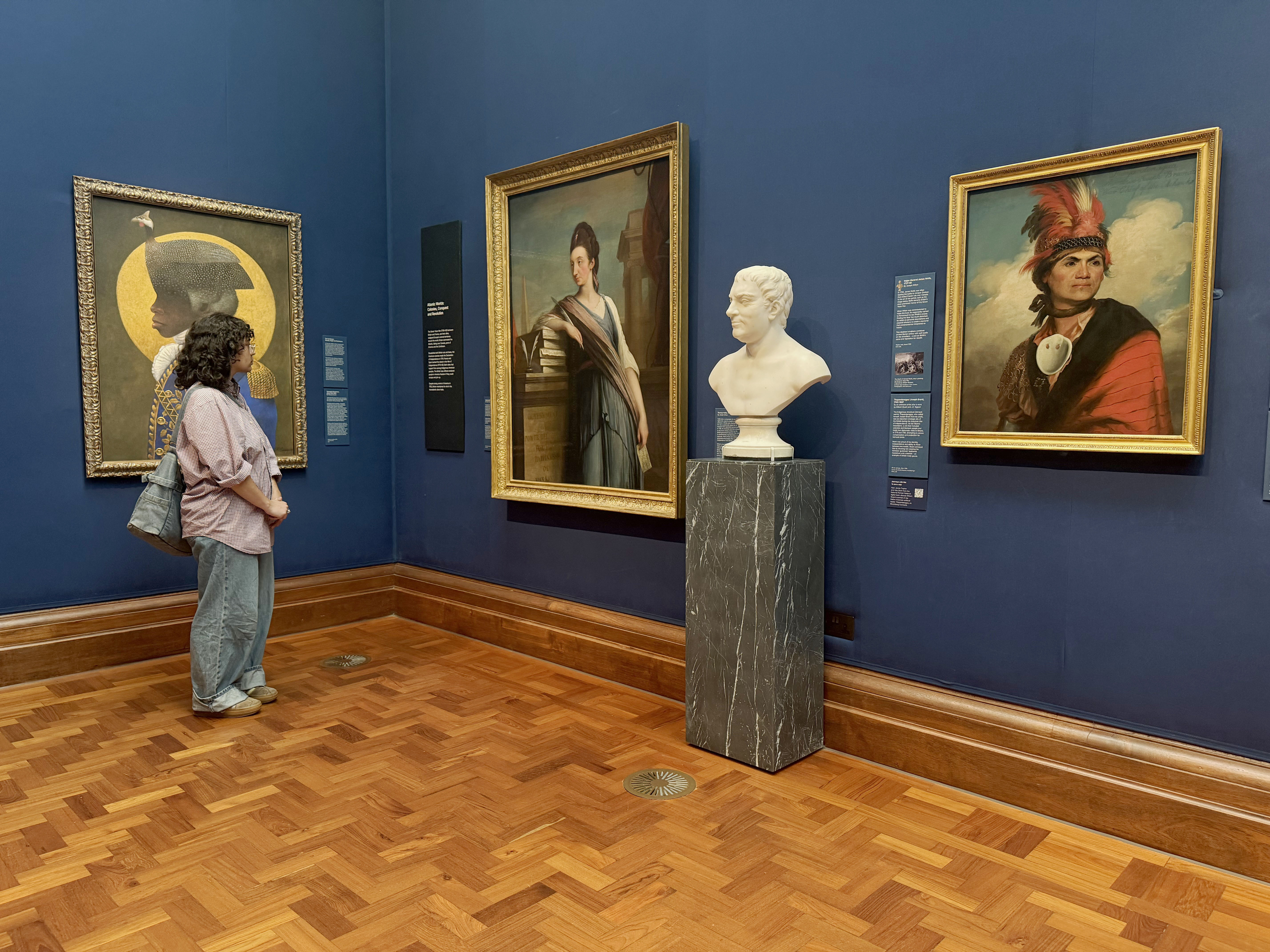
National Portrait Gallery, London - Portraying Colonial Expansion & Experience

In summer 2025 the Gallery expanded and reframed its physical displays and online presentations, including its school hub, to include material addressing colonial expansion and migration to Britain. "Reframing Narratives: Women in Portraiture.. aims to enhance the representation of women in the National Portrait Gallery's Collection and highlight the often-overlooked stories of individual women who have shaped British history and culture". "People Powered" explores "the stories of international and world-class industries, ... looking at their impact on communities and local landscapes".

== Exterior busts ==
In addition to the busts of the three founders of the gallery over the entrance, the exterior of two of the original 1896 buildings are decorated with stone busts of eminent portrait artists, biographical writers and historians. These busts, sculpted by Frederick R. Thomas, portray James Granger, William Faithorne, Edmund Lodge, Thomas Fuller, The Earl of Clarendon, Horace Walpole, Hans Holbein the Younger, Sir Anthony van Dyck, Sir Peter Lely, Sir Godfrey Kneller, Louis François Roubiliac, William Hogarth, Sir Joshua Reynolds, Sir Thomas Lawrence and Sir Francis Chantrey.

== Finances and staff ==
The National Portrait Gallery is an executive non-departmental public body of the UK Government, sponsored by the Department for Digital, Culture, Media and Sport.

The National Portrait Gallery's total income in 2007–2008 amounted to £16,610,000, the majority of which came from government grant-in-aid (£7,038,000) and donations (£4,117,000). As of 31 March 2008, its net assets amounted to £69,251,000. In 2008, the NPG had 218 full-time equivalent employees. It is an exempt charity under English law.

== Directors ==
- 1857–1895: Sir George Scharf
- 1895–1909: Sir Lionel Cust – previously at the Department of Prints and Drawings at the British Museum, and from 1901 to 1927 filled the role of Surveyor of the King's Pictures
- 1909–1916: Charles Holmes – later director of the National Gallery
- 1917–1927: James Milner
- 1927–1951: Henry Hake
- 1951–1964: Charles Kingsley Adams
- 1964–1967: David Piper – later director of the Fitzwilliam Museum and fellow of Christ's College, Cambridge (1967–1973), and first director of the Ashmolean Museum (1973–1985)
- 1967–1973: Roy Strong
- 1974–1994: John Hayes
- 1994–2002: Charles Saumarez Smith
- 2002–2015: Sandy Nairne
- 2015–June 2024: Nicholas Cullinan
- 2024: Michael Elliott (interim)
- 2024–present: Victoria Siddall

== Legal threat against a former Wikipedia volunteer ==
On 14 July 2009, the National Portrait Gallery sent a demand letter alleging breach of copyright against a former editor-user of Wikipedia, who downloaded thousands of high-resolution reproductions of public domain paintings from the NPG website, and placed them on Wikipedia's sister media repository site, Wikimedia Commons. The gallery's position was that it held copyright in the digital images uploaded to Wikimedia Commons, and that it had made a significant financial investment in creating these digital reproductions. Whereas single-file low resolution images were already available on its website, the images added to Wikimedia Commons were re-integrated from separate files after the user "found a way to get around their software and download high-resolution images without permission."

In 2012, the Gallery licensed 53,000 low-resolution images under a Creative Commons licence, making them available free of charge for non-commercial use. A further 87,000 high-resolution images are available for academic use under the gallery's own licence that invites donations in return; previously, the gallery charged for high-resolution images.

As of 2012, 100,000 images, around a third of the Gallery's collection, had been digitised.

== See also ==
- BP Portrait Award
- British Photographic Portrait Prize
- Royal Society of Portrait Painters
