= Alfred Egmont Hake =

English author (1849–1916)

Alfred Egmont Hake (1849–1916) was an English author and social thinker. He became associated with the narrative of Charles George Gordon as a figure of the British Empire, in a fortuitous way.

== Early life ==
Hake was born in Bury St Edmunds, the fourth son of Lucy Bush and Thomas Gordon Hake, a physician. An early friend was William Michael Rossetti, his father being involved professionally with the Rossetti family. He joined the Savile Club in 1878.

== The General Gordon story ==
Charles George Gordon was a first cousin of Hake's father, his paternal grandmother Augusta Maria Hake (née Gordon) being Gordon's aunt. In 1884 Hake published The Story of Chinese Gordon. It concentrated on Gordon's role opposing the Taiping Rebellion. It became topical with the Siege of Khartoum launched that year by Mahdist forces. A companion volume Gordon in China and Soudan was published in 1885, and sold well.

While Gordon remained in the besieged city of Khartoum, journals were taken out through the lines; J. Donald Hamill-Stewart, who left in September 1884, had been keeping a journal, a task taken over by Gordon himself from 10 September. What he wrote to 14 December was brought out, and sent to London. Sir Henry William Gordon, Gordon's brother, was entitled to the papers, after Gordon's death on 26 January 1885; and decided that Hake should edit them. On the other hand, the War Office wanted them suppressed. Gordon himself had thought some very personal comments should not be published; while the content included extended attacks on the current Liberal administration of W. E. Gladstone. Sir Henry was apparently unaware of Hake's political sympathies (he was a strong Conservative supporter).

In the end a popular, two-volume edition of Gordon's journal appeared, with Hake as editor, on 25 June 1885. He added an introduction strongly critical of the government's inactivity in supporting Gordon. Sir Henry Gordon required, contractually, that substantial redaction of the text removed a large number of personal references. Heavy criticism of Evelyn Baring remained. Hake took advice from Wilfrid Meynell, and consulted Wilfred Scawen Blunt the Arabist on background.

Hake then lectured on Gordon and the failure of the Liberal government to rescue him in Khartoum, before the 1885 United Kingdom general election. He undertook a tour in England and Scotland, from the late summer to November: the election campaign started on 24 November. The Conservatives supported the tour covertly through Richard Middleton; and finance was provided by Lord Cranborne and his sister, with whom Hake was in contact in October and December.

== Later life ==
Hake edited in 1866 The State, a Conservative weekly; it had a short lifespan. He became interested in the economics of free trade, was a critic of the Bank Charter Act 1844, and invented a system of banking; which Oscar Wilde found amusing. He wrote works for the Free Trade in Capital League.

Hake died on 8 December 1916 of peripheral neuritis, in the City of London Lunatic Asylum, Stone, Kent.

== Works ==
Hake wrote:

- Paris Originals: With Twenty Etchings (1878)
- The Unemployed Problem solved (1884), pamphlet
- The New Dance of Death (1884) with J. G. Lefebre
- The Story of Chinese Gordon (1884). The updated New York edition was expanded by Hugh Craig.
- Gordon in China and the Soudan (1885), companion volume to the above.
- The Journals of Major-gen. C.G. Gordon, C.B., at Kartoum (1885, 2 vols.), editor
- Remington's Annual (1889), editor
- Free Trade in Capital: Or, Free Competition in the Supply of Capital to Labour, and Its Bearings on the Political and Social Questions of the Day (1890), with O. E. Wesslau. For the views of the Free Trade in Capital League, an anti-socialist organisation.
- Events in the Taeping Rebellion (1891), editor
- Suffering London - Or, the Hygiene, Moral, Social, and Political Relations of Our Voluntary Hospitals to Society (1892)
- Regeneration: A Reply to Max Nordau (1896). This book was published anonymously. Hake linked Max Nordau's ideas in Degeneration with the possibility of imperial decline. Members of Nordau's family called the book anti-Semitic. It has also been called a "hatchet job". On the other hand, Camporesi in the Oxford Dictionary of National Biography describes it as "a fundamental and seminal work, proposing not only a cultural and anthropological interpretation of the sociological problems, but even a philosophy of history and a theodicy."
- The Coming Individualism (1895) with O. E. Wesslau

Hake also collaborated with David Christie Murray on novels. He contributed to the Open Review of Arthur Kitson.

== Family ==
In 1879 Hake married Philippa Mary Handley, daughter of Alexander Charles Handley
