= Herbert Michael Shircore =

Bangladeshi politician (1870 – 1948)

- Born: 1870; Calcutta, Bengal Presidency, British India
- Died: 1948 (aged 77–78); India
- Occupations: Lawyer, judge
- Known for: Legal career in British India and association with the Armenian community

Herbert Michael Shircore, CIE was an Armenian businessman and former chairman of Narayanganj municipality.

== Biography ==
Shircore was born in 1874 in Kolkata. He moved to Narayanganj to work as the manager of an Armenian owned jute mill. His father was Stephen Arratoon Shircore. He studied at the Doveton College, Calcutta.

Shircore founded G.M. Shircore and Sons, a departmental store in Narayanganj that sold European products. He also founded a horse carriage business. He was elected Chairman of Narayanganj municipality. He received an honour as a Companion of the Order of the Indian Empire in 1933 as part of the 1933 Birthday Honours.
