= Francis Murray Austin =

WWI and WWII British naval officer

Vice-Admiral Sir Francis Murray Austin, KBE, CB (10 September 1881 – 19 June 1953) was a Royal Navy officer who served in both world wars.

== Biography ==
Austin entered the Britannia in 1895 as a naval cadet and went to sea in HMS Repulse in 1897 as midshipman, participating in that year's Diamond Jubilee naval review at Spithead. He became sub-lieutenant in 1900 and was promoted to lieutenant in 1902, having obtained four first-class certificates. He then specialised in gunnery, serving as gunnery officer of HMS Hermione, HMS Isis, HMS Temeraire, and HMS Colossus. He was promoted to commander in 1913.

On the outbreak of the Second World War in 1939, Austin returned to active service as a commodore in the Royal Naval Reserve. He served continuously as a convoy commodore for three years and was appointed KBE in 1942 for his service.
