= Thomas Gordon Hake =

English poet and physician (1809–1895)

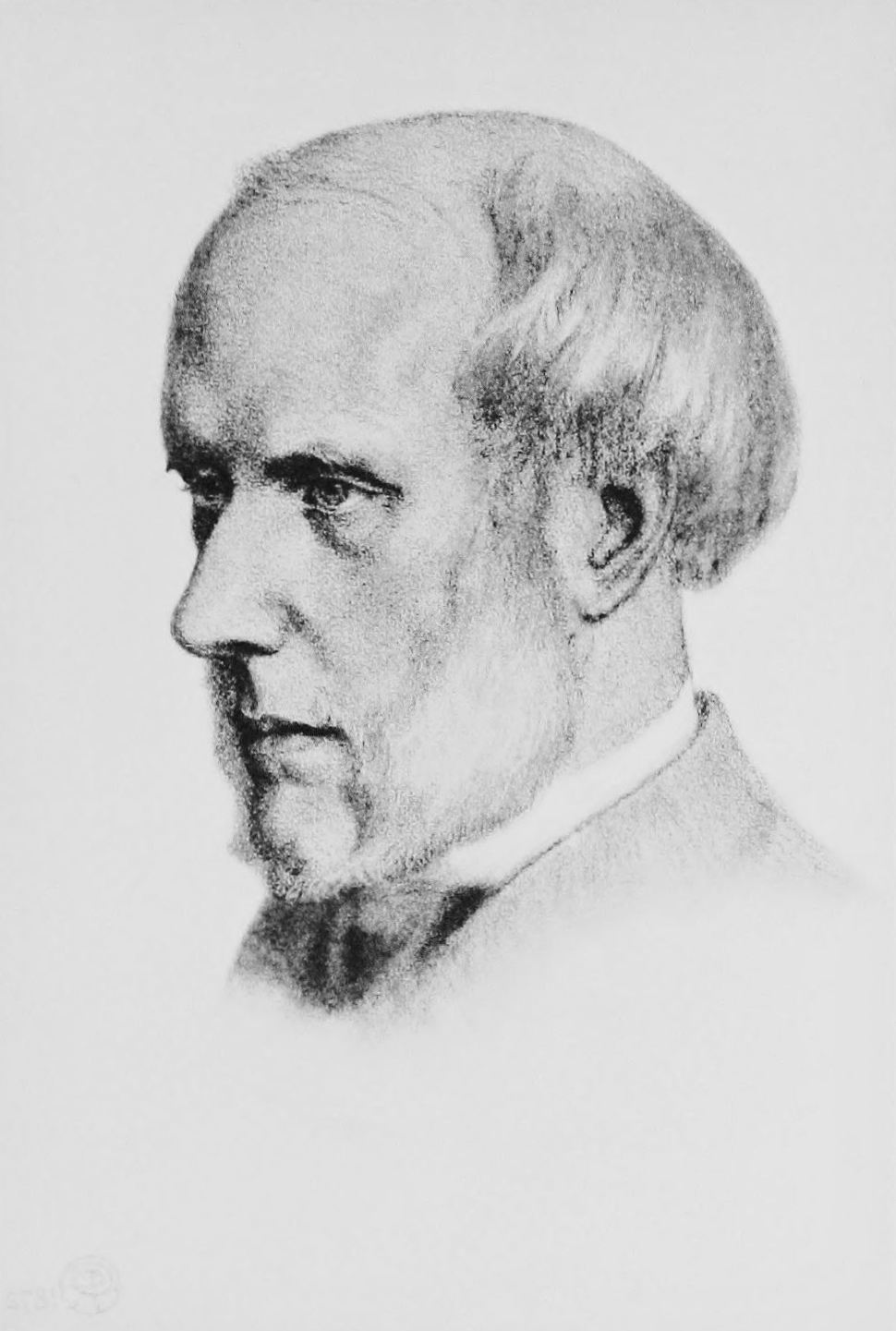
- Portrait of Thomas Gordon Hake by Dante Gabriel Rossetti
- Born: 10 March 1809
- Died: 11 January 1895 (aged 85)
- Resting place: Highgate Cemetery
- Occupation: Physician

Thomas Gordon Hake (10 March 1809 – 11 January 1895) was an English physician and poet.

== Life ==
Hake was born in Leeds on 10 March 1809, and was descended from an old Devonshire family who had 'lived on the soil for many years without being distinguished in any branch of science, literature, or art.' His father, whose usual residence was Sidmouth, possessed considerable musical acquirements. His mother, fourteen years older than the father, was of the Huntly branch of the Gordon family, being eldest daughter of Captain William Augustus Gordon, and aunt of General Charles Gordon. His father died when Hake was three years old and his mother, left with a moderate competence, continued to live in Devonshire, and obtained for her son an admission to Christ's Hospital, where, first at the preparatory school at Hertford and afterwards in London, he received most of his education.

Having determined upon a medical career, Hake studied at Lewes under Thomas Hodson, 'the highest authority in his profession within the bounds of Sussex,' afterwards at St. George's Hospital, and at the University of Edinburgh and University of Glasgow, at which latter he graduated. After travelling for some time in Italy he settled at Brighton, where he was for five years physician to the dispensary, then proceeded to Paris for a year's study, and on his return in 1839 published Piromides, a tragedy on the mysteries of Isis, and the 'nebulous but impressive romance,' as Mr. W. M. Rossetti calls it, Vates, or the Philosophy of Madness, first issued in four incomplete numbers, with illustrations by Charles Landseer (1840, 4to), and afterwards republished in Ainsworth's Magazine as 'Yaldarno, or the Ordeal of Art-Worship.'

Towards 1844, 'it seethed in my brother's head,' says Mr. Rossetti, and it ultimately led to a friendship between Dante Rossetti and the author eventful for both. Hake next settled at Bury St. Edmunds, where he became intimate with George Borrow and J. W. Donaldson, of both of whom he has given interesting particulars in his autobiography. Between 1839 and 1853, he contributed numerous papers, chiefly of a scientific complexion, to the medical journals. About the latter date he gave up practice at Bury, travelled in America, and on his return established himself at Roehampton, and, while tilling the post of physician to the West London Hospital, became physician to the Countess of Ripon, who was related to his mother's family. The beauty of Lady Ripon's woods at Nocton revived the spirit of poetry within him. He wrote his Lily of the Valley and his Old Souls, which, with other poems, were threaded together as The World's Epitaph, privately printed in 1866 in an edition of one hundred copies. One of these came into the hands of Rossetti, who admired it as enthusiastically is Valdarno, and the two poets met in October 1869.

In Rossetti's darkest days, when in 1872 his life was nearly terminated by laudanum, Hake rendered the greatest service. "He was the earthly providence of the Rossetti family," says Mr. W. M. Rossetti. He took Dante Rossetti to his house during the wont of the crisis, afterwards accompanied him to Scotland, and consented to his own son George acting for a long time as Rossetti's companion and secretary, a position which the derangement of the patient's mental and physical health eventually rendered untenable.

After 1872, Hake spent a considerable time in Italy and Germany, and, returning to England, settled near St. John's Wood, principally occupied in the composition and publication of poetry for the few, difficult rather than obscure in thought and diction, but uninviting to those who cannot appreciate mystical symbolism. In 1871 he published Madeline and other Poems, reproducing much of The World's Epitaph. In 1872 appeared Parables and Tales, comprising "Old Souls." In 1876 he published New Symbols; in 1879 Legends of the Morrow; in 1880 Maiden Ecstasy; in 1883 The Serpent Play, and in 1890 The New Day, a collection of sonnets in the Shakespearean form.

Hake's autobiography, Memoirs of Eighty Years, was published in 1892. During the last four years of his life he was confined to his couch by a fracture of the hip, but his faculties and spirits remained unimpaired. He died on 11 January 1895 and is buried in a family grave on the western side of Highgate Cemetery.

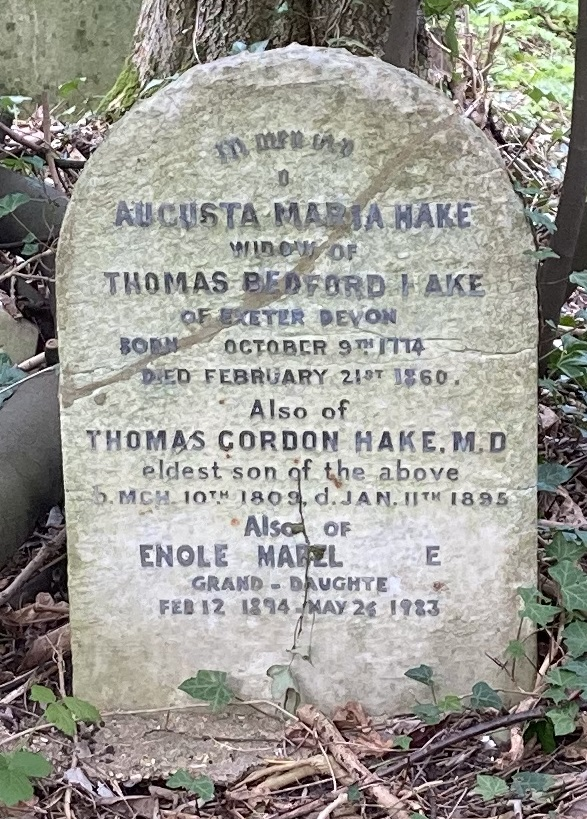
Family grave of Thomas Gordon Hake in Highgate Cemetery

== Works ==
In 1839, he published a prose epic Vales, republished in Ainsworth's Magazine as Valdarno, which attracted the attention of Dante Gabriel Rossetti. Rossetti, against his habit, reviewed Hake's poems in The Academy and the Fortnightly Review. Hake became a member of the circle round Rossetti. Hake's first poetry collection, The World's Epitaph, was published in 1866, in a print run of 100.

In 1871, Hake published Madeline; in 1872, Parables and Tales; in 1879, Legends of the Morrow; in 1880 Maiden Ecstasy (poems) in 1883, The Serpent Play; in 1890, New Day Sonnets; and, in 1892, his Memoirs of Eighty Years.

== Family ==
In the 1830s, Hake married Lucy Bush. They had several sons, including Alfred Egmont Hake, an author and philosopher who wrote a biography of General Charles Gordon.

== Sources ==
- Garnett, Richard; et al. (Revised by Michael Thorn) (2004). "Hake, Thomas Gordon". Oxford Dictionary of National Biography (online ed.). Oxford University Press. doi:10.1093/ref:odnb/11882. (Subscription, Wikipedia Library access or UK public library membership required.)
