= Order of Saint Agatha =

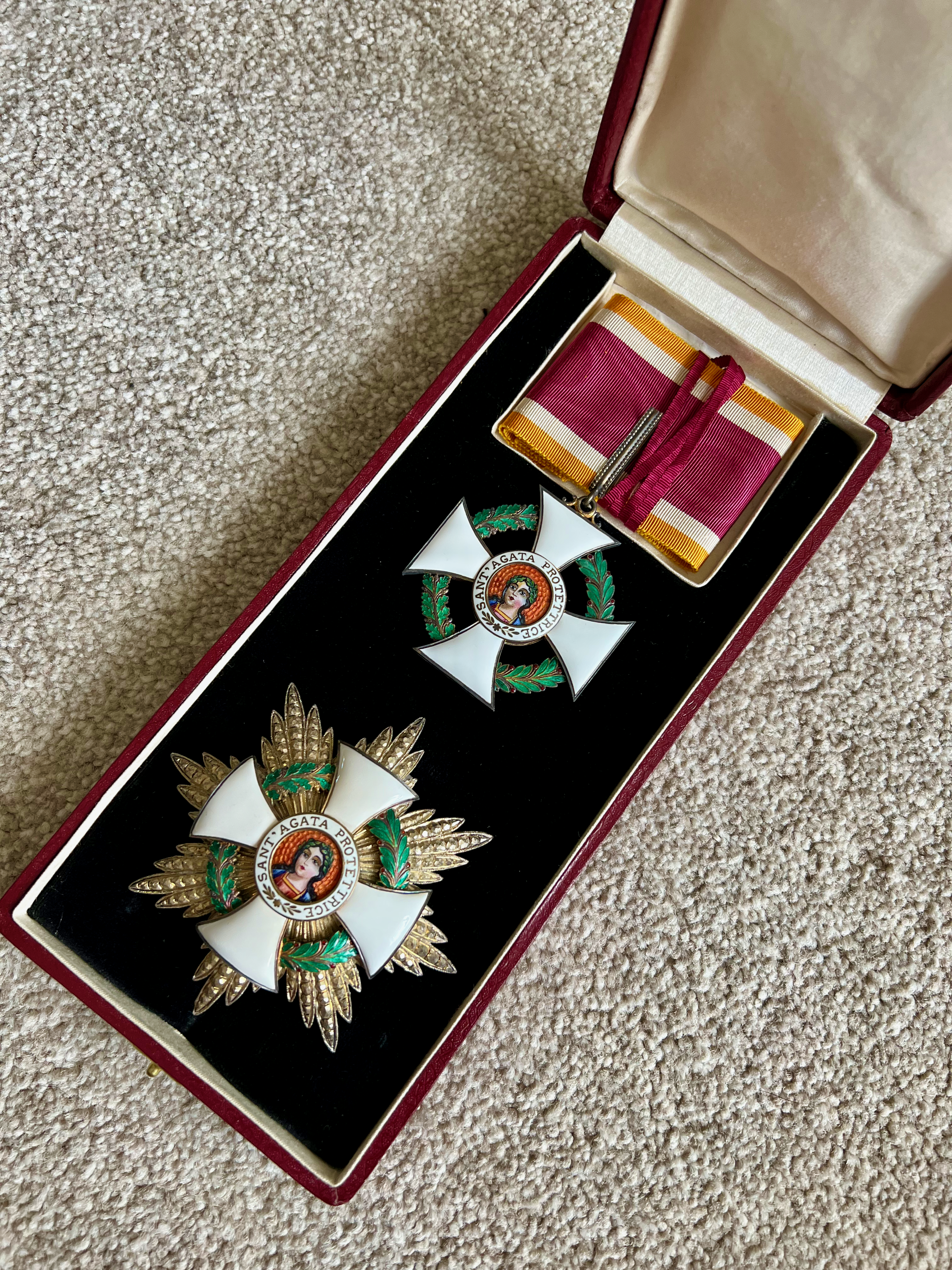
- Insignia of a Grand Officer of St Agatha.
- Type: State order
- Country: San Marino
- Awarded for: Charitable work for San Marino.
- Grandmaster: Captains Regent
- Secretary: Secretary for Foreign Affairs

Precedence
- Next (higher): Order of San Marino

The Order of Saint Agatha (Italian: Ordine Equestre di Sant'Agata) is a State order established on 5 June 1923 by the Grand and General Council of the Republic of San Marino. It is named after Saint Agatha, on whose feast day 5 February, Pope Clement XII reestablished the sovereignty of the republic in 1740.

The Order is awarded to foreign nationals deserving of recognition for charitable or other services to the Republic of San Marino.

Conferred by the Grand and General Council on the proposal of the Most Excellent Regency of the Republic of San Marino, the Order comprises 5 grades: Grand Cross, Grand Officer, Commander, Officer and Knight.

The badge of the Order is a cross with curved ends enamelled white and edged in gilt. Charged on one side with a round golden shield bearing the effigy of Saint Agatha and includes the inscription Sant'Agata Prottetrice (Saint Agatha Protector), on the other side is written the motto Bene Merenti (To a well-deserving person). The insignia suspends by a ribbon with five stripes of white, crimson and yellow.

The Order of San Marino is the next higher in order of precedence.

== Grades ==
The Order is presented in five grades:

1. Grand Cross (Cavaliere Gran Croce)
2. Grand Officer (Cavaliere Grande Ufficiale)
3. Commander (Cavaliere Ufficiale Maggiore o Commendatore)
4. Officer (Cavaliere Ufficiale)
5. Knight (Cavaliere)

Order of Saint Agatha ribbon bars
Knight	Officer	Commander	Grand Officer	Grand Cross

== Recipients ==
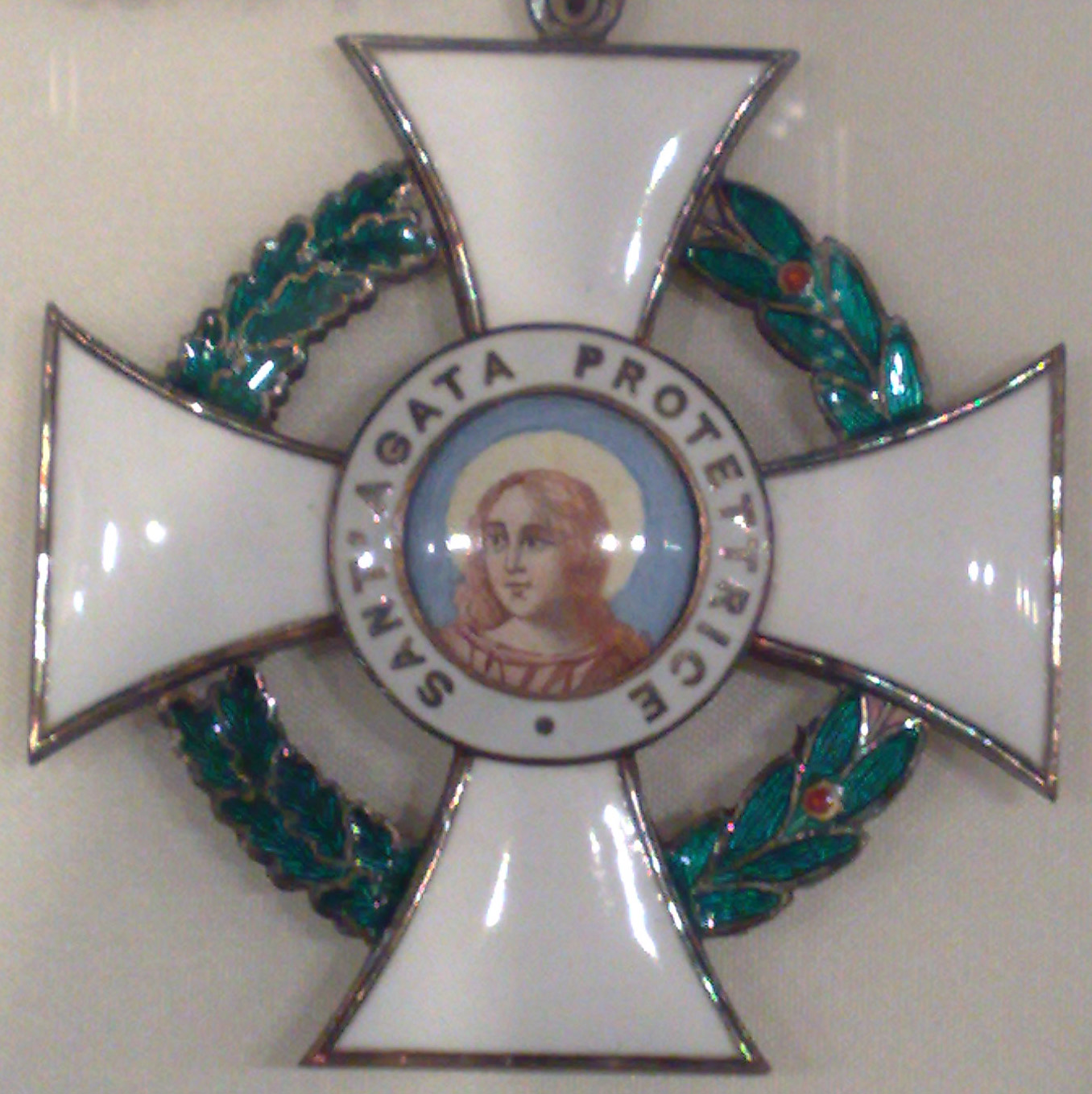
St. Agatha neck decoration.

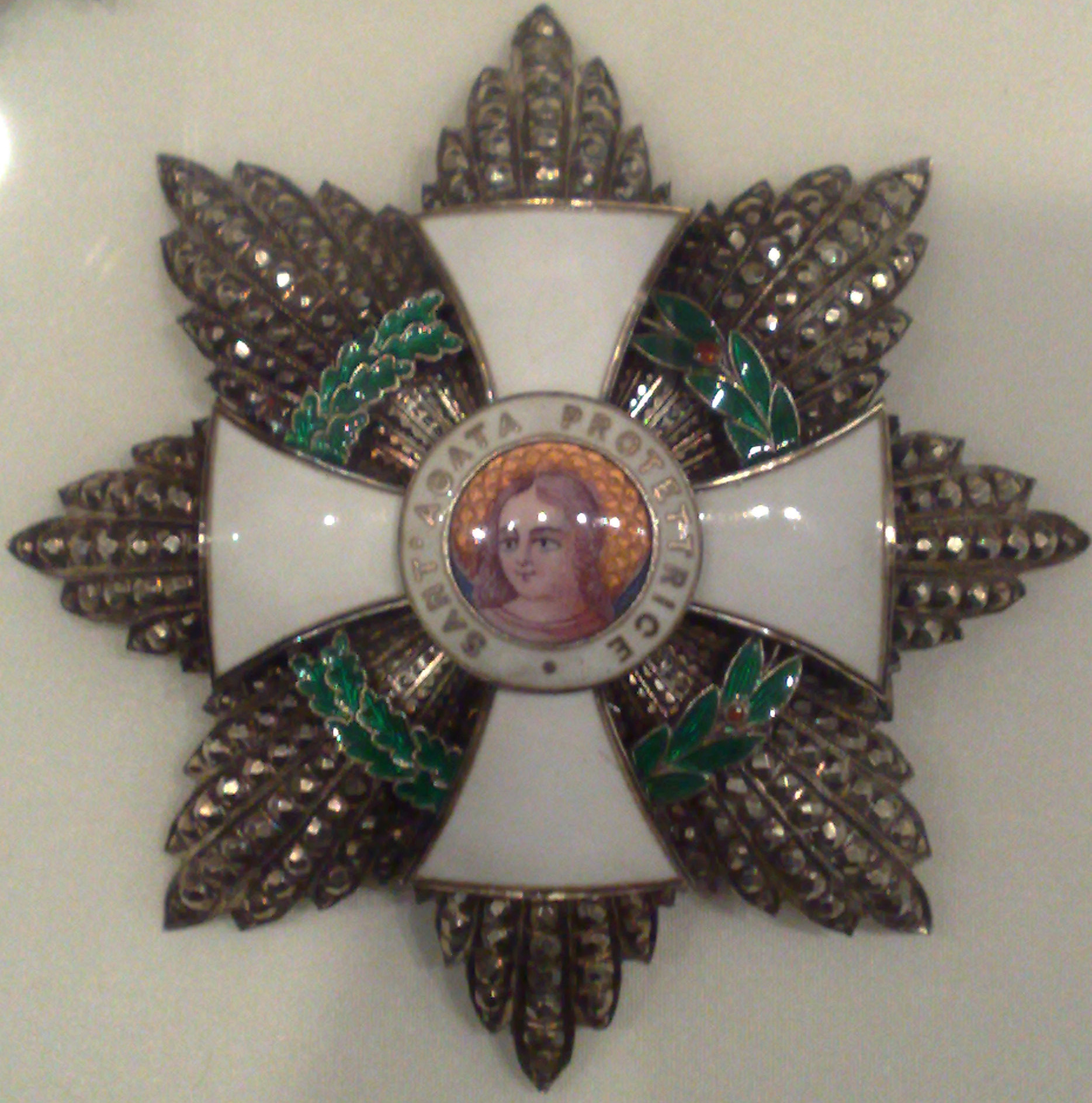
St. Agatha Grand Cross breast star.

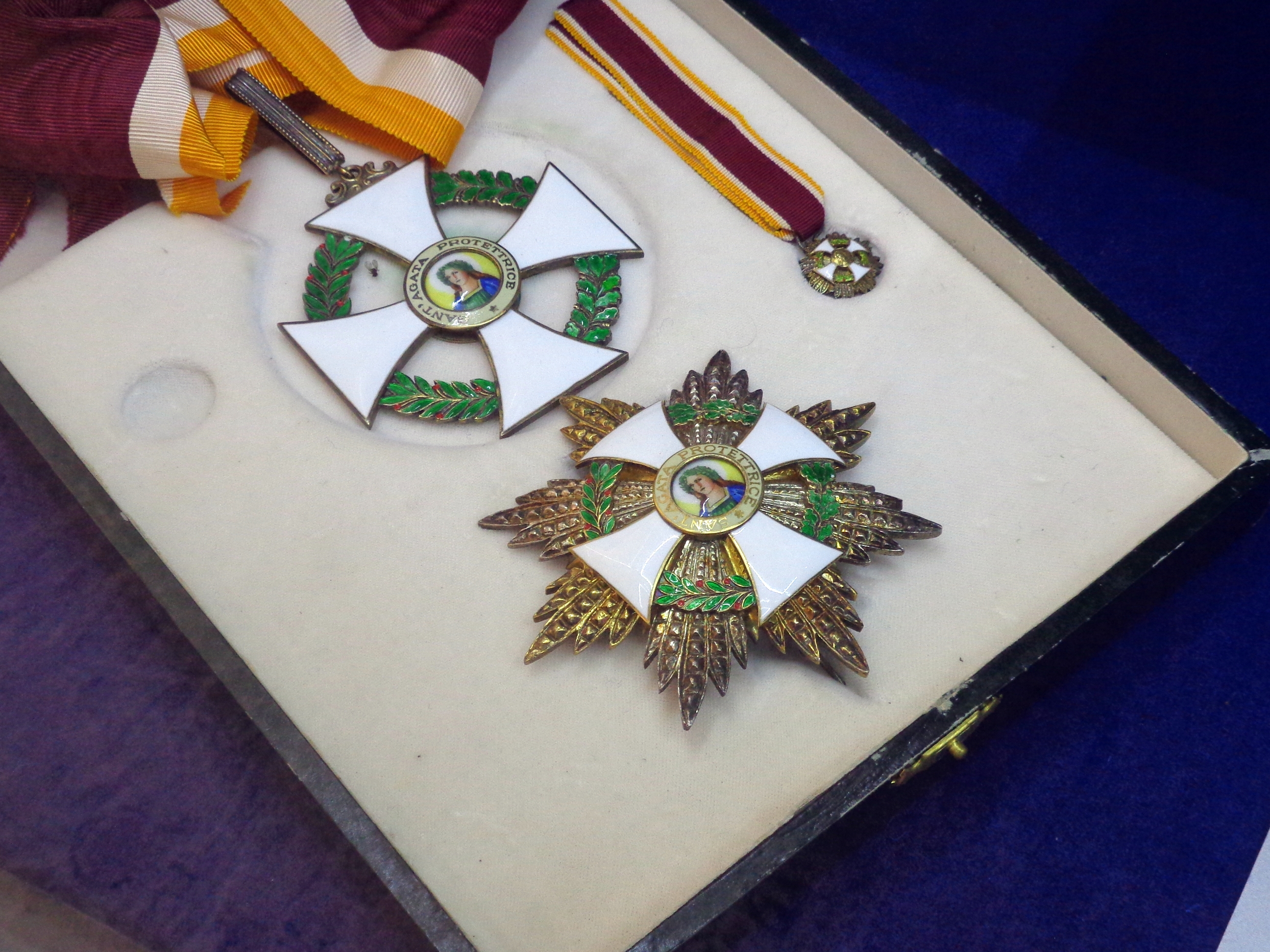
St. Agatha Grand Cross insignia.

Prominent people awarded the Order of Saint Agatha

Year of award	Recipient
	SMOM – Prince Dominique de La Rochefoucauld-Montbel
	Italy – Cardinal Pietro Gasparri
	Italy – Dino Grandi
	Italy – Giovanni Marinelli
	Italy – Giulio Onesti
	Belgium – Baron Robert Rothschild
1925	United States – Edgar Erskine Hume
1932	Vatican City State – Pope Paul VI
1934	United Kingdom – Edward VII
1934	United Kingdom – Edward VIII
1935	British India – Maharajah Jagatjit Singh
1937	United Kingdom – Sir Edmund Gabriel
1944	United States – Charles Poletti
1946	United States – Judge Juvenal Marchisio
1948	Italy – Giulio Andreotti
1937	France – Valery Larbaud
1956	United States – Avery Brundage
1956	United Kingdom – Sir John Wilson
1958	Italy – Giovanni Spadolini
1958	France – Vincent Delpuech
1958	Belgium – Roger Motz
1958	Belgium – Lucien Cooremans
2002	Italy – Dario Fo
2010	Monaco – Prince Albert II
2012	Italy – Sophia Loren
2013	South Korea – Ban Ki-moon
2019	Russia – Sergey Lavrov
2020	United Kingdom – Theresa, Baroness May of Maidenhead
2020	United Kingdom – Jeremy Hunt
2021	Lebanon – Nadey Hakim
2021	United Kingdom – Andrew Rosindell
2021	United Kingdom – George Holmes
2022	United Kingdom – Lisa Cameron
2022	United Kingdom – Norman Foster
2023	United Kingdom – Sheryll Murray
2025	Italy – Domenico Bellantone, Consul General of Italy in the United Kingdom
2025	Italy – Inigo Lambertini, Ambassador of Italy to the United Kingdom
2025	United Kingdom – Dominic Johnson, Baron Johnson of Lainston
2026	Italy - Andrea Kimi Antonelli

== Design ==
The Orders design is made up of a white-enamelled cross backed by a green-enamelled wreath of oak and laurel leaves. The central disc bears a painted image of Saint Agatha, the Orders namesake, surrounded by a white-enamelled ring. The ring bears the words; "SANT AGATA PROTETTRICE" (Saint Agatha Protector), while the bottom has a gold laurel wreath. The reverse of the badge shows a gold representation of the Coat of Arms of San Marino, surrounded by the Orders motto: Bene Merenti.

The ribbon of the Order is actually the colours of the flag of San Marino, used between 1465 and 1797. The ribbon is made up of the three colours, with a larger field of burgundy in the center, edged with smaller bands of white and orange on both sides.

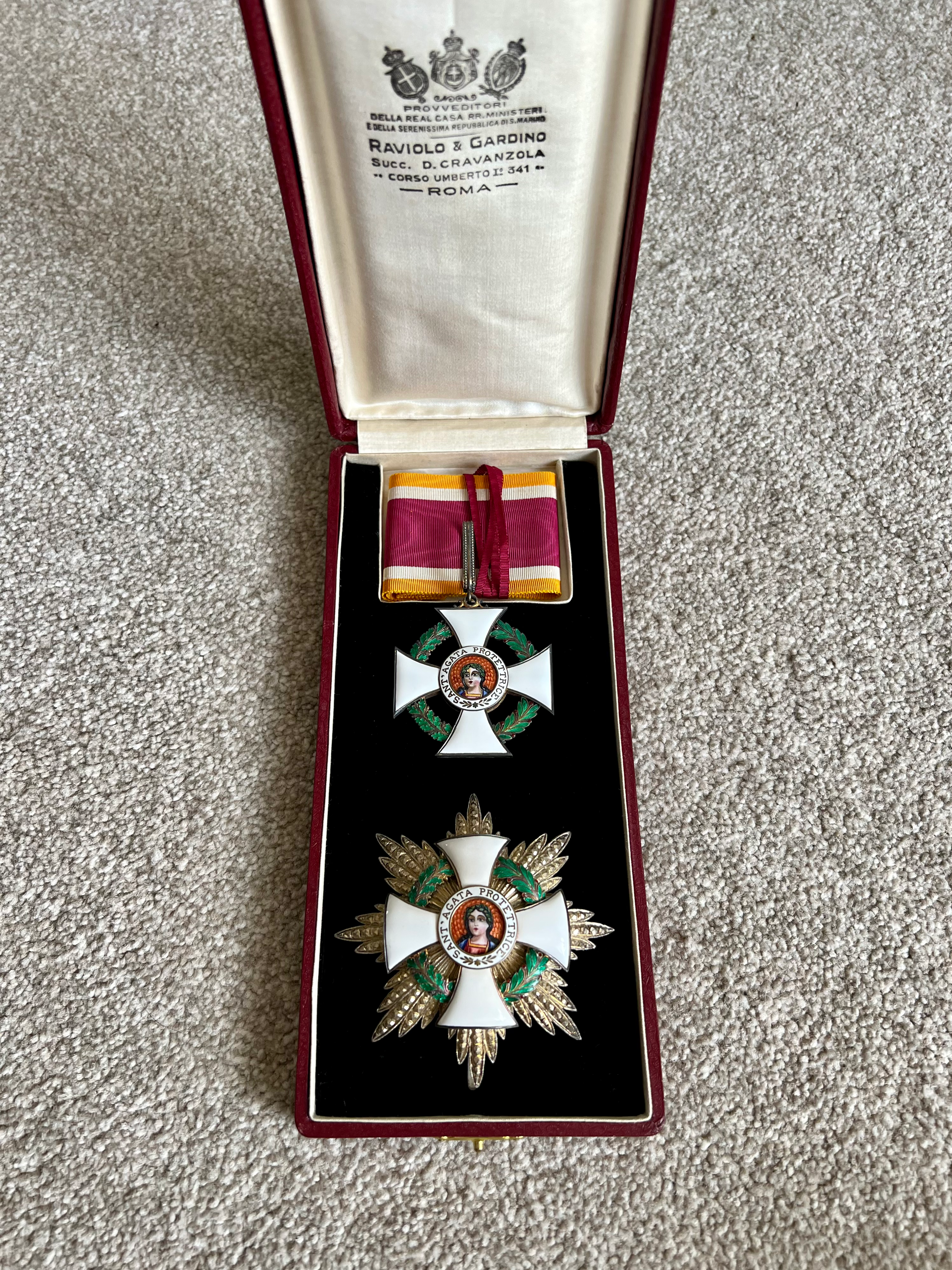
Grand Officer set.

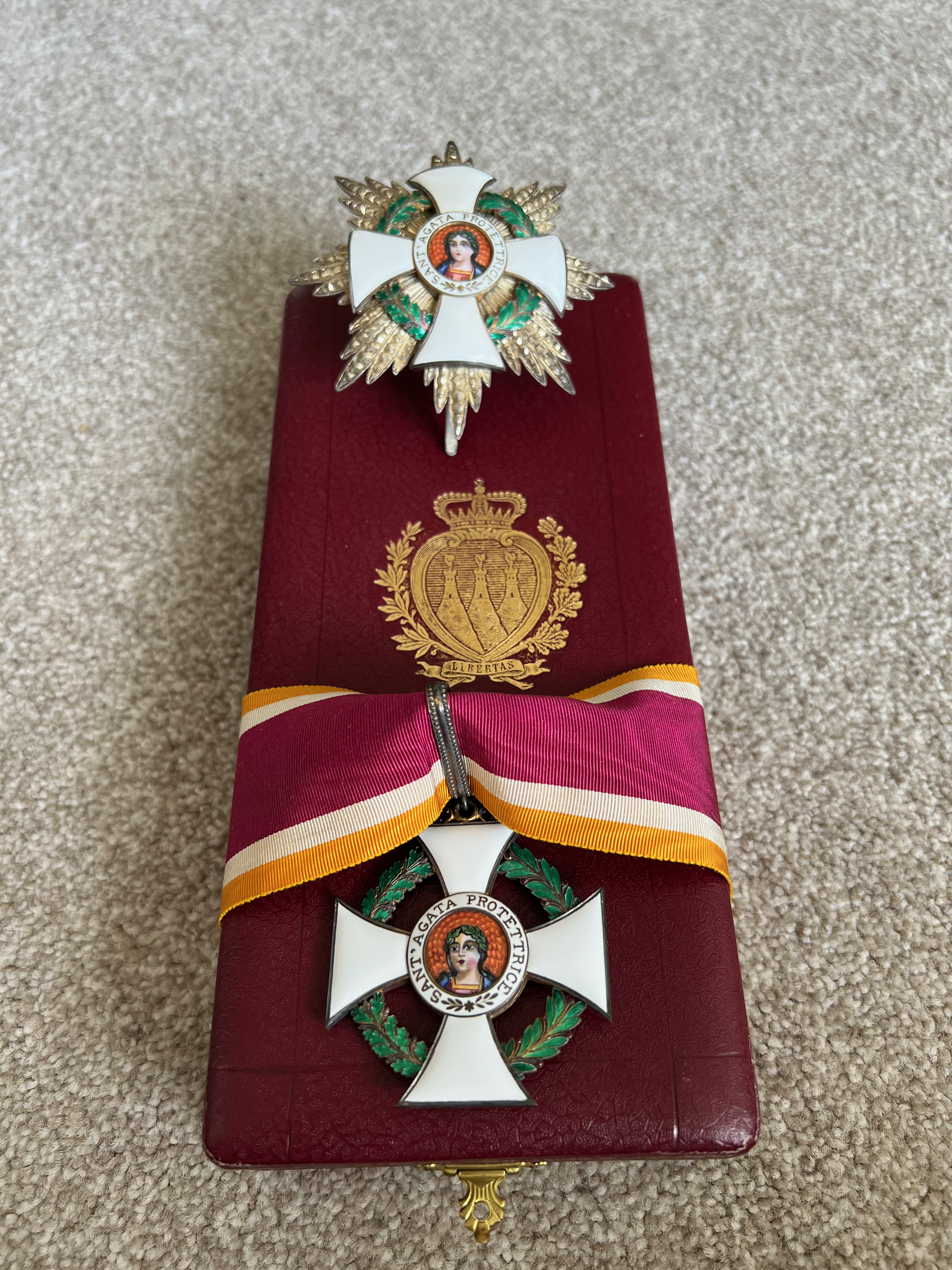
Grand Officer set.

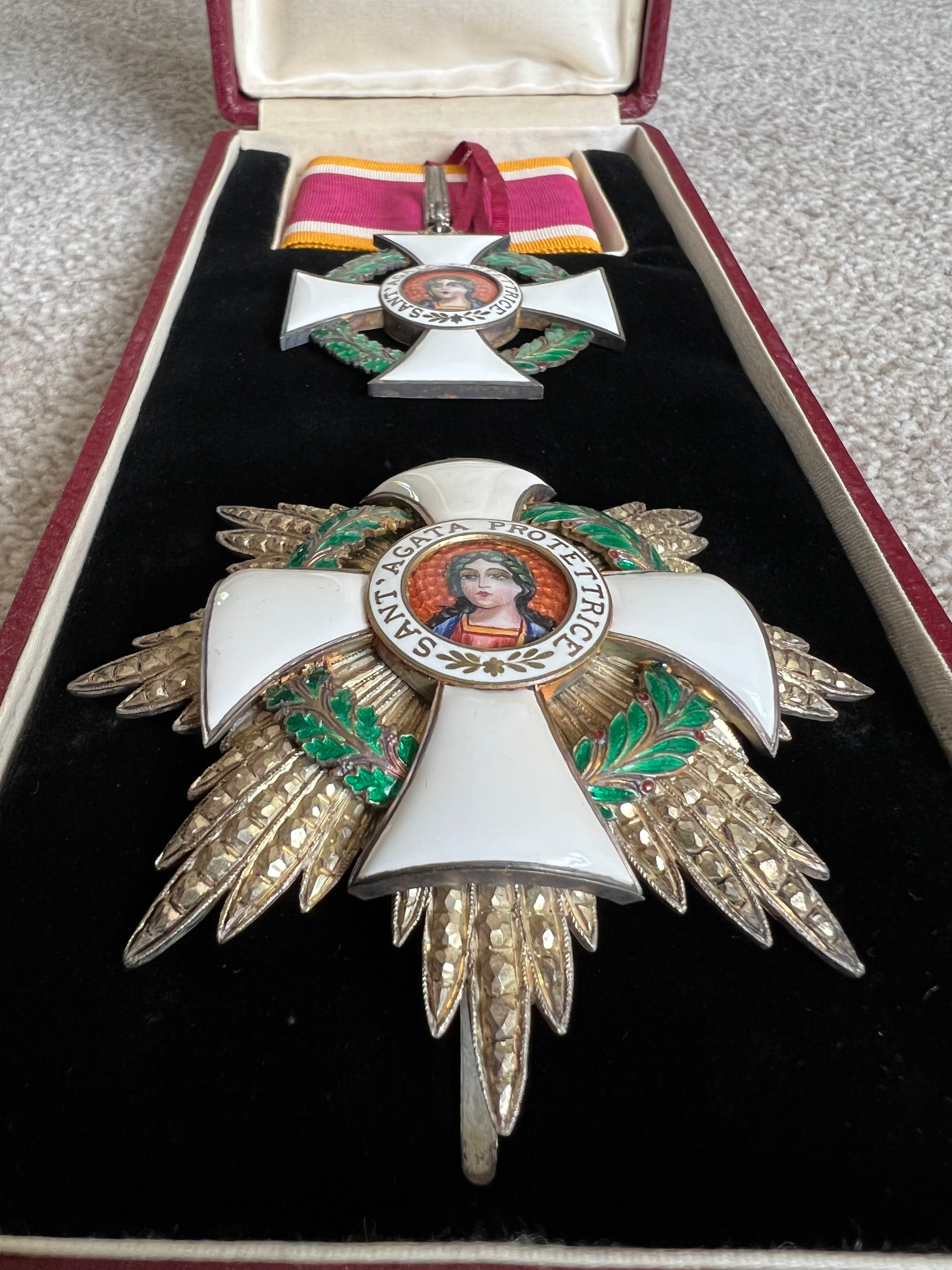
Star of the Grand Officer grade of the order.

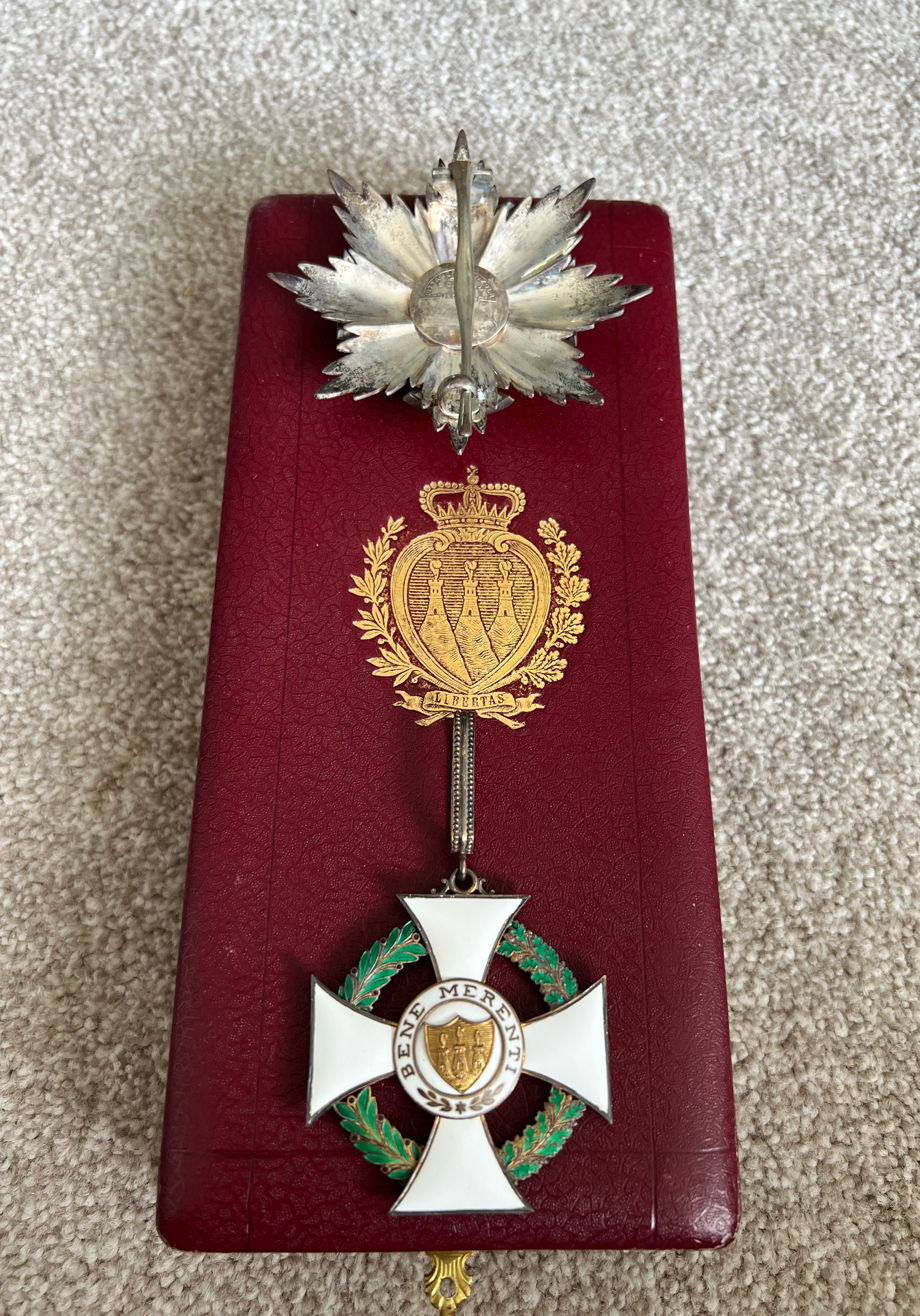
Reverse of the insignia of the Grand Officer grade.

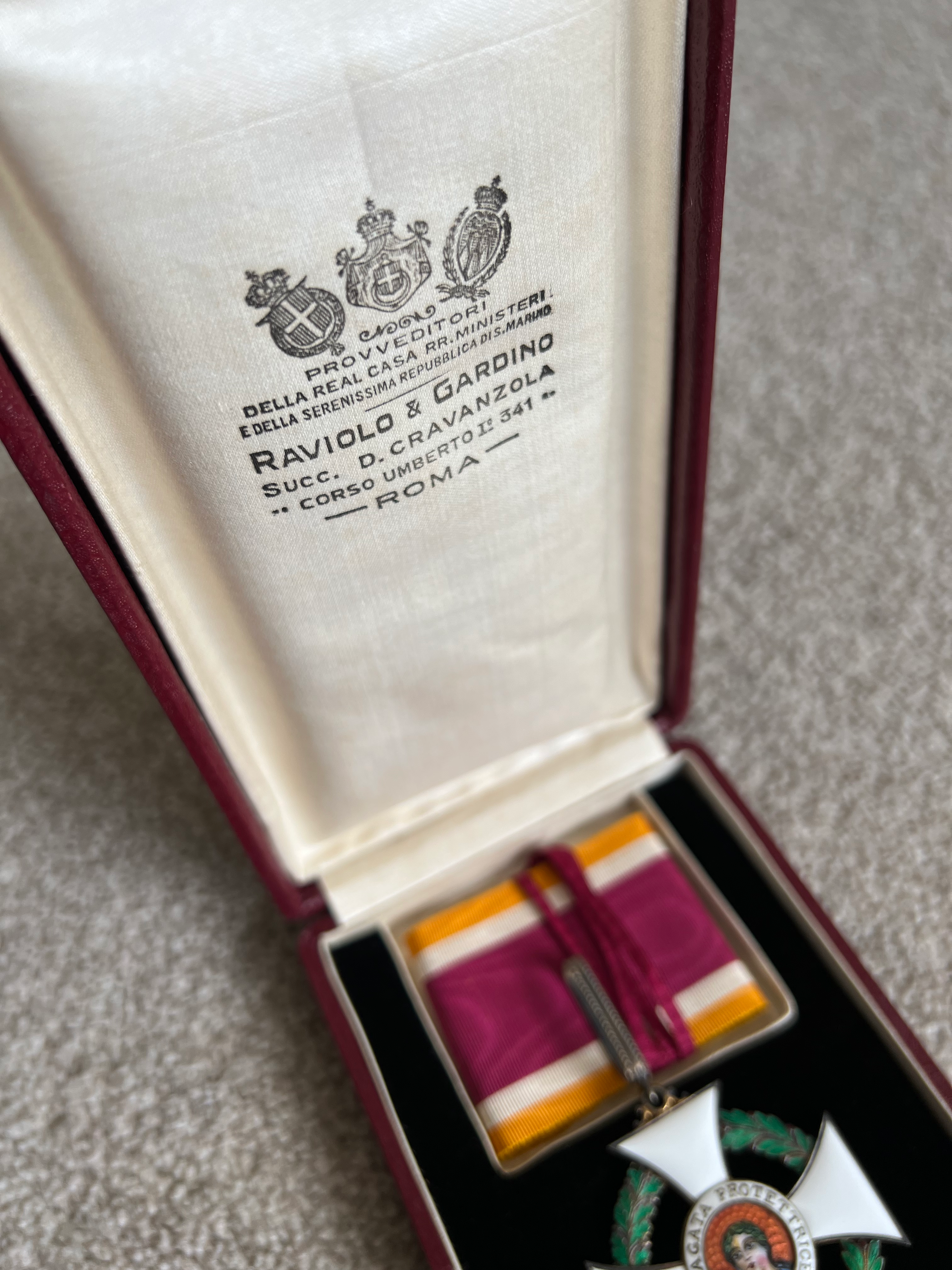
Close-up of the inner lid of the case of the Grand Officer showing the logo of Cravanzola, c.1940

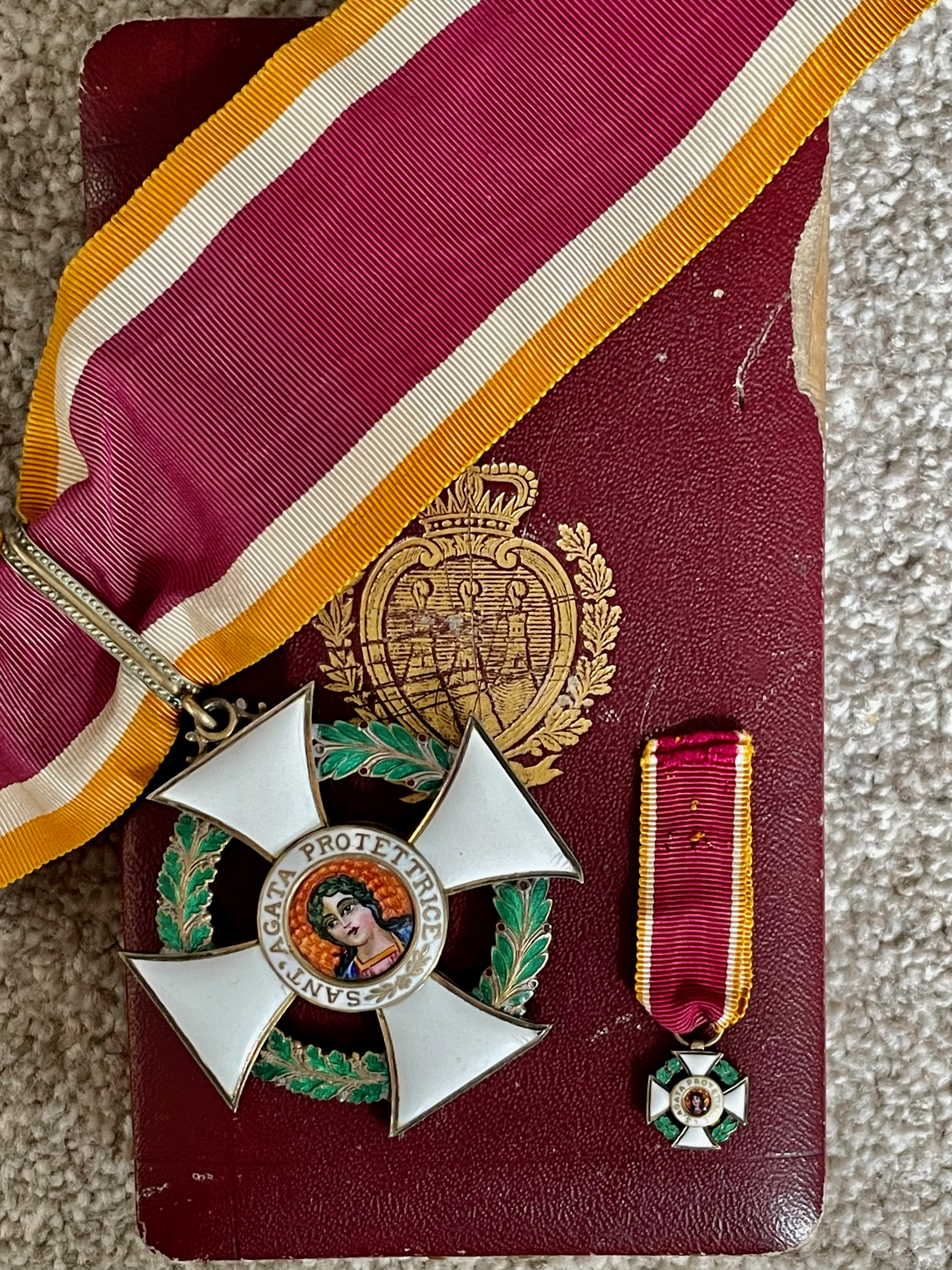
Commanders class of the order.

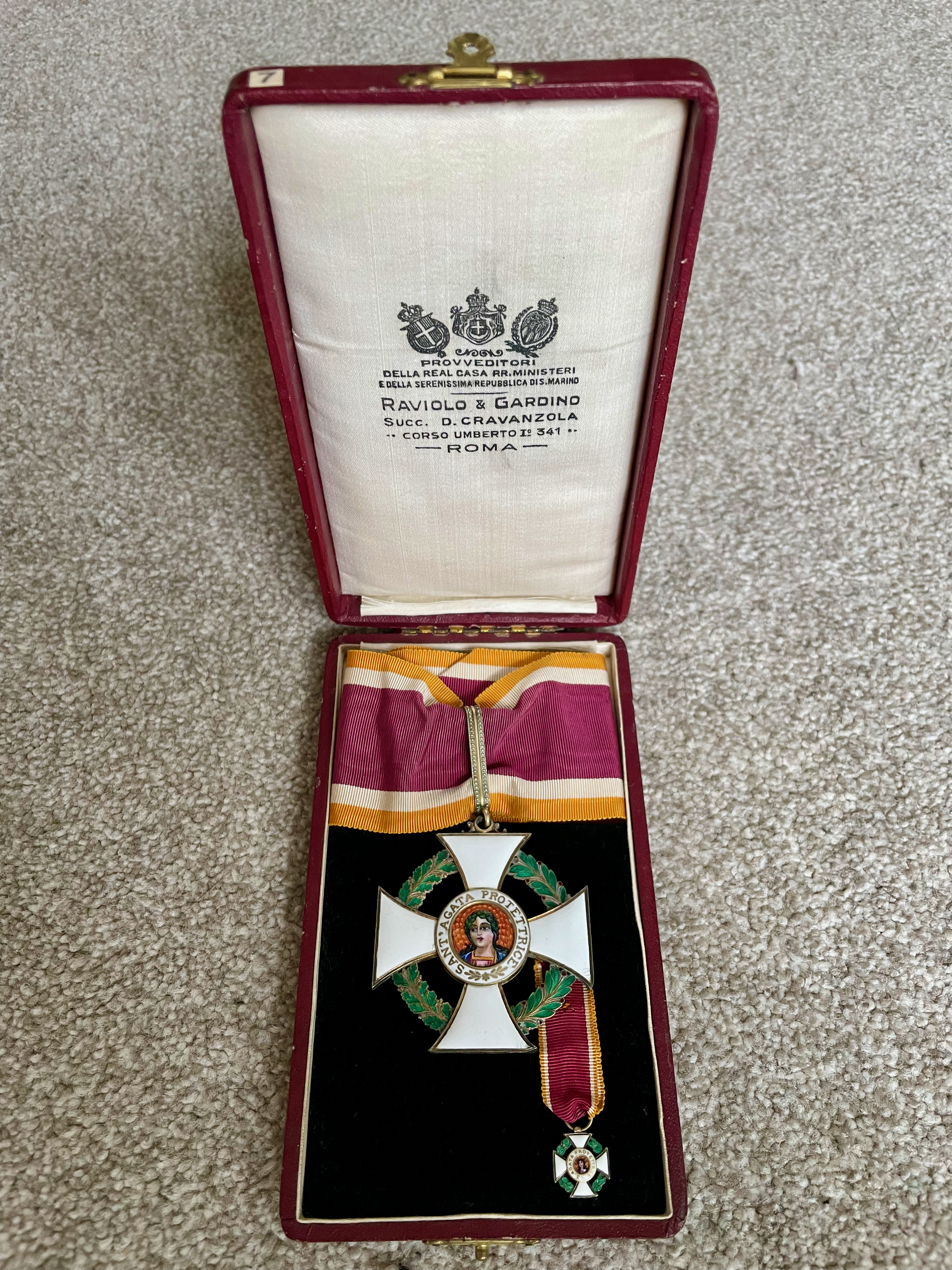
Set of the Commander of the order.
