= Degg's Model =

Natural disaster concept

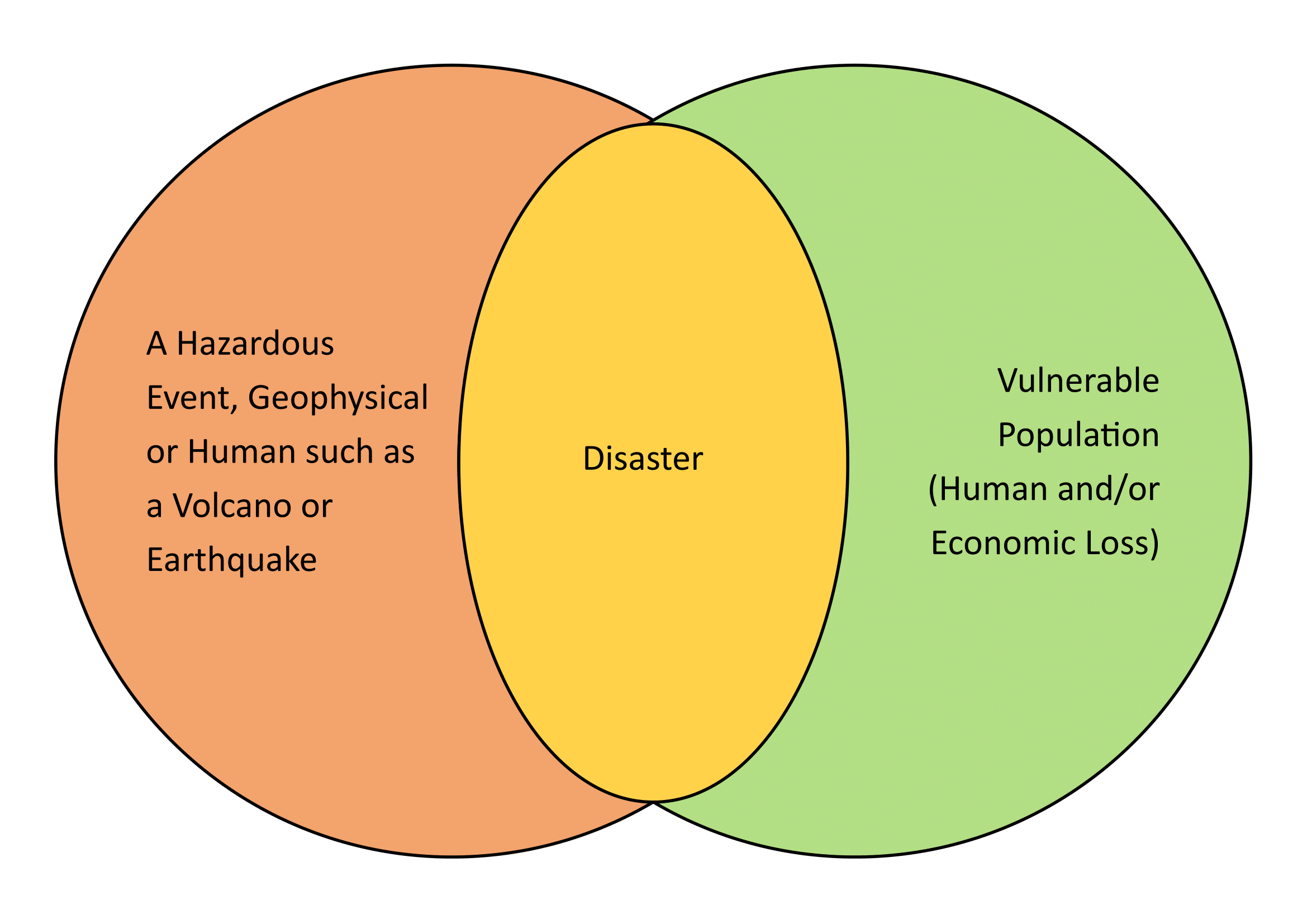
Degg's Model

Degg's Model shows that a natural disaster only occurs if a vulnerable population is exposed to a hazard and that the resilience of a community is an important parameter in determining the impact and consequences of a hazardous event. The model was devised in 1992 by Martin Degg, head of the geography department at the University of Chester, in England.
