= Marchisio =

Marchisio (Italian pronunciation: [marˈkiːzjo]) is an Italian surname, particularly common in Piedmont. Notable people with the surname include:

- Claudio Marchisio (b. 1986), Italian footballer
- Juvenal P. Marchisio (1902–1973), American lawyer, judge and president of American Relief for Italy
- Luigi Marchisio (1909–1992), Italian cyclist
- Rita Marchisio (b. 1950), Italian runner
- Rosina Lawrence Marchisio (1912–1997), Canadian-American actress
