= University of Greater Manchester =

University in Bolton, Greater Manchester England

Coordinates: 53°34′25″N 2°26′9″W

- Coat of arms
- Former name: University of Bolton
- Motto: Latin: Sapientia Superat Moras
- Motto in English: Wisdom Overcomes Difficulty
- Type: Public
- Established: 1824 – Bolton Mechanics' Institute; 1982 – Bolton Institute of Higher Education; 2004 – gained university status
- Affiliations: Million+ North West Universities Association; Universities UK
- Endowment: £160,000 (2009)
- Chancellor: George Windsor, Earl of St Andrews
- Vice-Chancellor: Vacant
- Administrative staff: 700+
- Students: 12,570 (2024/25)
- Undergraduates: 7,835 (2024/25)
- Postgraduates: 4,740 (2024/25)
- Location: Bolton, Greater Manchester, England, UK
- Campus: Urban
- Colours: Gold, navy blue
- Website: greatermanchester.ac.uk

The University of Greater Manchester (legally: The University of Greater Manchester Higher Education Corporation) is a public university in Bolton, Greater Manchester in England. It was known as the University of Bolton from 2005 until 2024. The university is commonly referred to as a 'post-92' institution, which is a reference to the Further and Higher Education Act 1992. It has approximately 11,000 students and more than 900 academic and professional staff.

It is a member of Universities UK, Million+, and the All-Party Parliamentary University Group.

== History ==
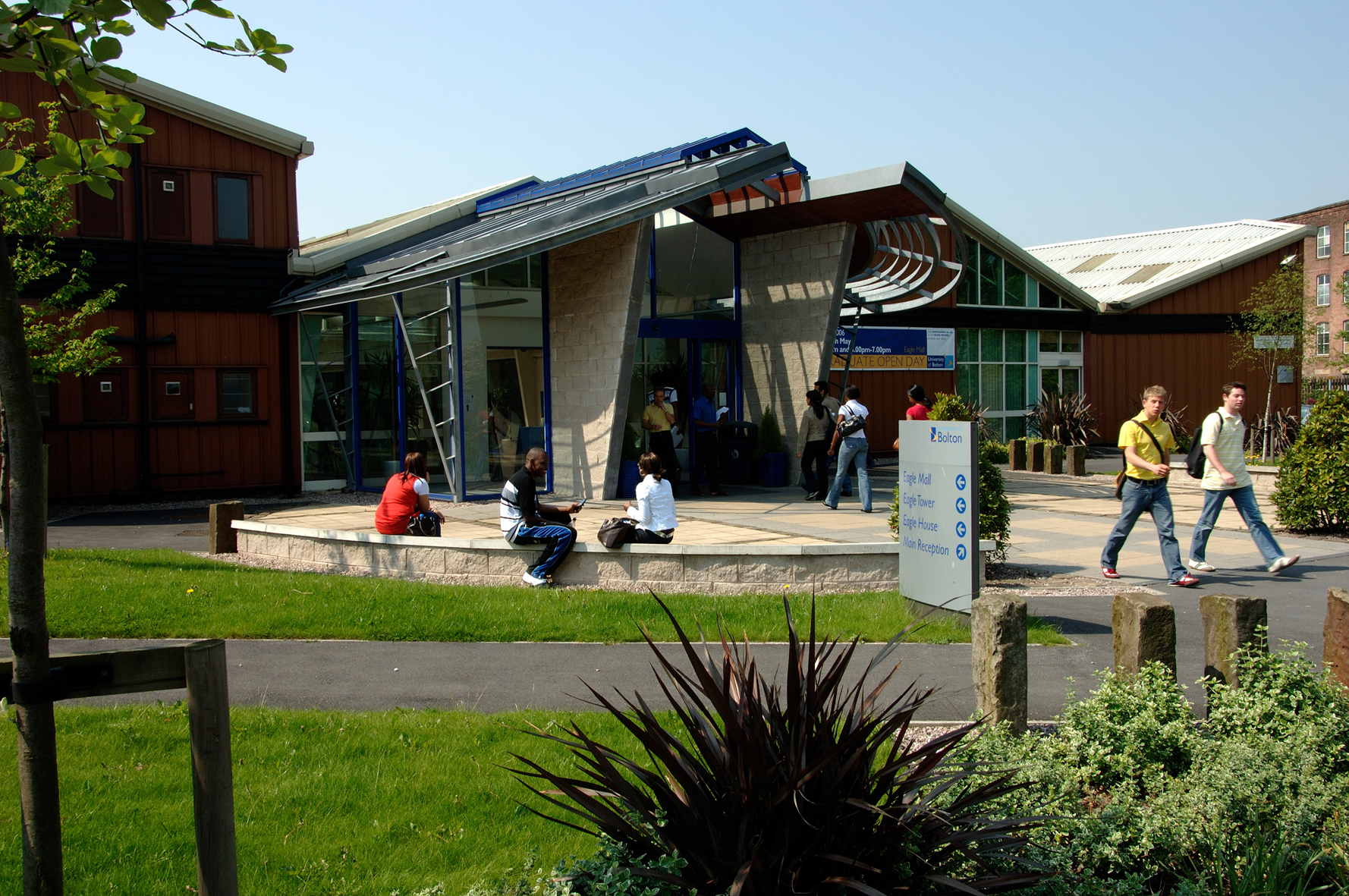
Chancellor's Building, October 2010

The University of Greater Manchester traces its origins back to 1824 with the founding of Bolton Mechanics' Institute. In 1887, the Committee of the Mechanics' Institute decided that the town's apprentices required technical instruction for the rapidly expanding engineering advances being made at the turn of the 19th century. That resulted in the creation of the new Technical School with student numbers rising to more than 1,500.

In 1926, Bolton Technical School became a college. Fifteen years later, a new building was opened offering a wide range of technical education choices, with engineering the most popular. In 1964, Bolton Technical College and the Bolton Institute of Technology were divided into two separate organisations. A. J. Jenkinson was principal of the Technical College, Bolton College of Education (Technical), and then the first principal of Bolton Institute of Technology.

Bolton Institute of Higher Education (BIHE) was formed in 1982 by the merger of the Bolton Institute of Technology and Bolton College of Education. The first principal of BIHE was John McKenzie, who was succeeded by Bob Oxtoby. Oxtoby began the campaign for university status. The university gained its degree awarding powers in 1990. An £8.3 million extension project began in 1991 with the purchase of the former Eagle Factory. Bolton Institute was awarded the right to award taught degrees in 1992, with the powers to award research degrees in 1996. In 1998, Mollie Temple became the third principal and successfully led the institution to achieve university status in 2004.

In November 2014, it became the first university in the North West to become a Living Wage employer. In 2023, the University of Bolton applied to change its name to the University of Greater Manchester, pending a consultation period. The current Vice-Chancellor has claimed that potential employers of graduates are prejudiced because Bolton was not widely known.

In 2026, Greater Manchester Police arrested the university’s longtime vice-chancellor George Holmes, his partner Louise Burrows and the university’s executive director of facilities Derek Rout; this was because they were suspected of fraud. This was following a suspension from post in May 2025.

== Campus ==
The university is primarily situated on an urban campus between Deane Road and Derby Street in Bolton. There are two halls of residence, although the university intends to relocate all services on to a single site in the centre of Bolton. There is an academic centre in Ras Al Khaimah, United Arab Emirates.

=== Facilities ===
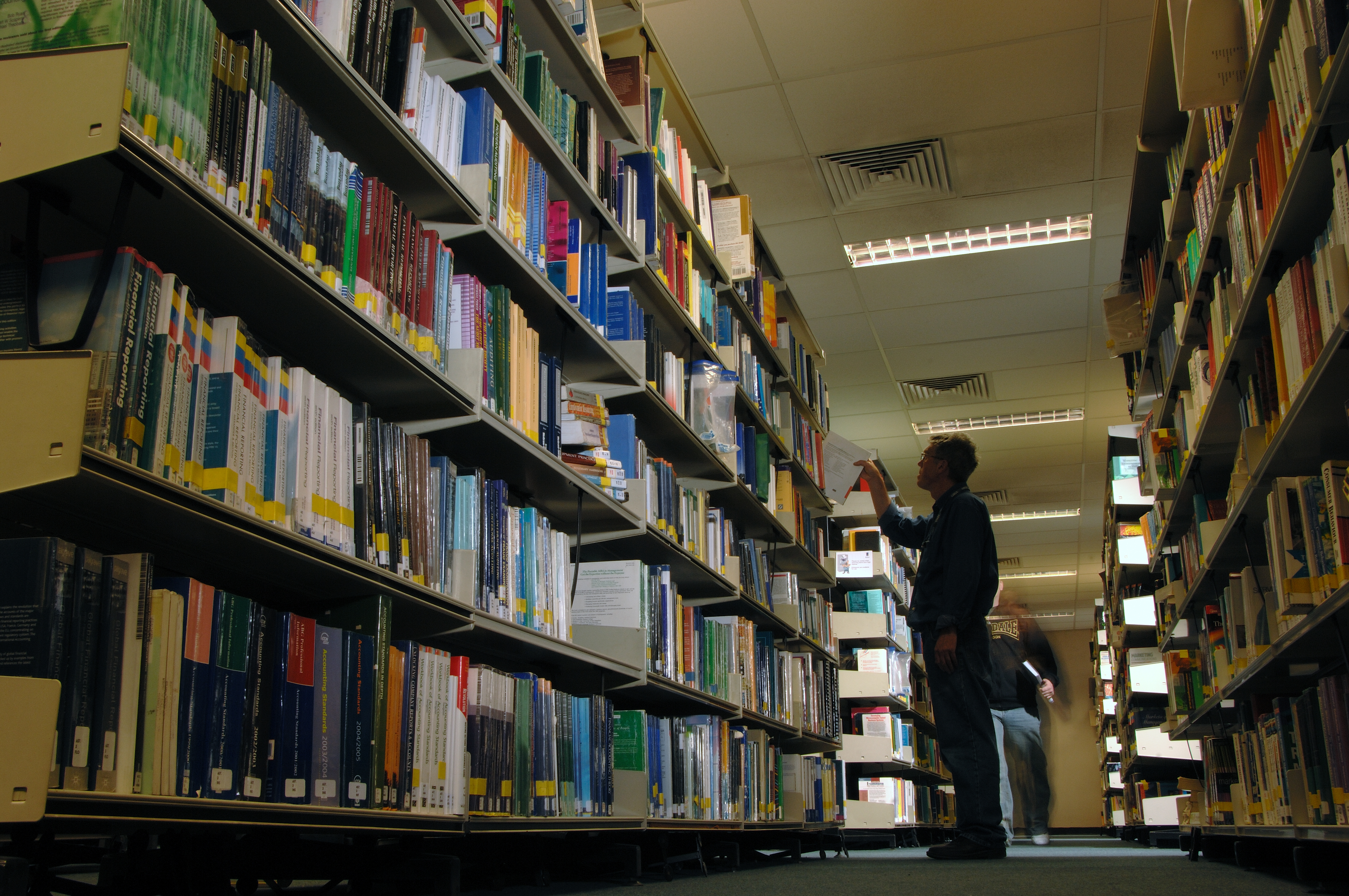
The Eagle library, September 2010

==== Senate House ====
Formally known as Deane Tower, Senate House underwent refurbishment in 2004 to become a centre for design disciplines, research, and consultancy services.

==== The Chancellor's Building ====
After the remodelling and centralisation of the university campus in 2007, a new £2.5 million Social Learning Zone for student study and Students' Union bar was built. The building also houses the university library, student services and coffee shop.

==== Eagle Tower ====
The five-storey building houses academic offices and subject areas including art & design, photography, graphics, media studies, special & visual effects, and psychology.

==== Bolton One ====
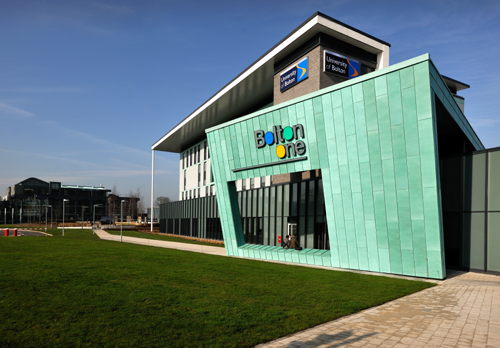
The Bolton One building on the university campus, May 2012

The Bolton One facility is a £31 million, three-way partnership with Bolton Council and NHS Bolton situated on the university's campus. The university contributed around £7 million to the development. The purpose-built centre houses new health, science and sports teaching and research facilities – as well as a sports complex.

==== Halls of residence ====
The university has approved and recommends Orlando Village halls of residence, which is owned by McComb Bolton Limited.

Other accommodation is provided by private landlords. The "Cube" on Bradshawgate was one such building; it was seriously damaged by fire in November 2019. Eyewitnesses say that the cladding on the building encouraged the spread of the fire. The Mayor of Greater Manchester, Andy Burnham said, "It does have a type of cladding which does cause concern. There will be many people living in buildings with this cladding today who will be very worried."

==== University Collegiate School ====
UTC Bolton, a university technical college sponsored by the University of Bolton, was established at the university campus in September 2015. In November 2015, the UTC was officially opened by Prince Edward, Earl of Wessex and named the 'Stoller Building' after the philanthropist Sir Norman Stoller. In September 2020, the school was renamed University Collegiate School. It is now a full secondary school sponsored by the university.

==== Growth and future plans ====
The university has also announced plans for a new £10 million facility for Science and Engineering, which will house its Centre for Advanced Performance Engineering. Construction was set to begin following the completion of the UTC building in September 2015. There was also to be a renovation and expansion of the current campus through to 2017.

In 2015, the university and Bolton Council announced plans for a new £40 million student village, which was planned to accommodate up to 850 students in the heart of Bolton town centre, facing the iconic Le Mans Crescent.

==== International presence ====
The university has an academic centre in Ras al-Khaimah in the United Arab Emirates and established international links with a number of overseas academic establishments in China, Germany, Greece, Malawi, Malaysia, and Singapore.

Since 2009, the University of Bolton has had a partnership with Western International College Ras Al Khaimah with programmes available at Undergraduate and Postgraduate level. In December 2011, the University of Bolton launched its academic centre in Colombo, Sri Lanka, in partnership with the KES Group of Institutions. The university has a memorandum of understanding with the University of the Republic of San Marino, which promotes cooperation between the two institutions.

=== Steam hammer on Deane Campus ===
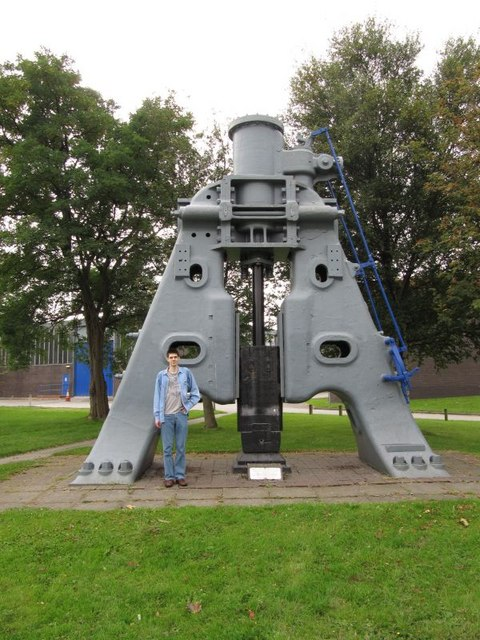
The hammer at the university, September 2009

The University of Bolton's Deane Campus hosts a 50-ton steam hammer, a significant artefact representing Bolton's industrial heritage, used at Thomas Walmsley's Atlas Forge.

The steam hammer was originally stationed at the Atlas Forge, located at the intersection of Bridgeman Street and Fletcher Street. It played a role in the forge's manufacturing processes, primarily reshaping white-hot iron billets into materials prepared for further refinement through rollers. During the 1960s and early 1970s, it was operated by a former steam train driver who transitioned to the steam hammer operator role after the closure of the nearby railway line connecting Bolton to Daubhill railway station which is now closed as well.

== Organisation and administration ==
=== Chancellors ===
- 2010–2014: Patricia Morris, Baroness Morris of Bolton
- 2014–2017: Sir Ernest Ryder
- 2017–present: George Philip Nicholas Windsor, Earl of St Andrews

On 11 July 2016, the board of governors announced the appointment of Lord St. Andrews as chancellor. The Earl commenced his responsibilities in January 2017.

=== Vice-chancellors ===
- 2025–present: Dr Greg Walker (acting),
- 2005–2025: George Holmes (suspended).

=== 2025 inquiry ===
In March 2025, accusations of serious misconduct at the university were made concerning payments to managers and accusations of racism, and an inquiry was launched by the university which commissioned Price Waterhouse Coopers (PwC) to investigate.

== Academic profile ==
=== Reputation and rankings ===
Rankings
National rankings
- Complete (2027): 111
- Guardian (2026): 54
- Times / Sunday Times (2026): 126

The Guardian ranked the University of Bolton as #38 in the United Kingdom in 2023 and #6 based on students' satisfaction with teaching.

== Student life ==
The University of Bolton has a diverse student population. About 13% of home students are from ethnic minority communities, with about 7% of its students being classed as international. That portion of students come from 70 countries outside the UK. The university also has a chaplaincy accommodating several different faiths.

=== Cycling ===
In June 2020, the University of Bolton launched a bike offer scheme in response to the COVID-19 pandemic. The university purchased one thousand bicycles and loaned them to students for commuting during the pandemic.

The university also organised cycling "refresher" sessions for interested students, aiming to promote safety and physical activity. The university's vice-chancellor posited that in addition to cycling's environmental impact, the scheme would help address students' concerns about public transport during the pandemic and foster physical well-being.

=== Students' Union ===
The main Students' Union (SU) building is on Deane Road at the centre of the University Campus. As well as being home to the SU bar (The Vista) and the hub of many social events, the union provides numerous other roles such as student support and advice (The Advice Unit), representation and sports societies.

=== Sport ===
Bolton has many different sports teams competing in the BUCS leagues. Teams include: basketball, netball, football, hockey, rugby league, and rugby union.

Bolton One also offers students an eight-lane, 25-metre competition swimming pool, 50 foot climbing wall and sports hall.

== Sponsorship ==
On 17 February 2016, it was announced that the University of Bolton would become the principal shirt sponsors of the Manchester Giants basketball team for the 2016 season. On 2 April 2016, the university again became the sponsors of Bolton Wanderers in an agreement which was initially planned to last until Summer 2016. Bolton Wanderers' stadium remained The University of Bolton Stadium until 2023 when it became the Toughsheet Community Stadium.

== See also ==
- Armorial of UK universities
- Alumni of the University of Greater Manchester
- Academics of the University of Greater Manchester
- College of Education
- List of universities in the United Kingdom
