= Tim Wheeler (academic) =

Timothy Jerome Wheeler DL (born 1950), is the former vice-chancellor of the University of Chester. He was Appointed Principal of University College Chester in 1998 and became the first vice-chancellor of the University of Chester in 2005. He retired in December 2019.

== Education ==
He was educated at Colwyn Bay Grammar School, Eirias High School and Llandrillo College before attending the University College of North Wales, Bangor, where he studied as an undergraduate and subsequently gained a doctorate in psychology.

== Appointments prior to Chester ==
Wheeler held lectureships in Psychology and Communications at Sheffield Hallam University in the 1970s, was appointed dean of the Faculty of Communication and Human Studies at Dublin City University and, in 1985, professor and head of the School of Social Studies at the Robert Gordon University.

Combined with a period as Senior Visiting Research Scholar at St John's College, Oxford, he was head of the department of communication and media at Bournemouth University. He moved to Southampton Institute in 1991 as a member of the Directorate. He became acting director in 1997.

== Work and appointments elsewhere ==
He is a Deputy Lieutenant for Cheshire and is actively involved with Chester Cathedral. He was deputy chair of the Cheshire and Warrington Local Enterprise Partnership.

== Work at the University of Chester ==
During his tenure as vice chancellor, Wheeler has most recently been responsible for the purchase of Western Command Building, now Churchill House overlooking the River Dee in Chester, formerly owned by Lloyds Bank PLC and prior to that the acquisition of the Shell International Research Centre at Thornton, now the Thornton Science Park; County Hall, Chester and Kingsway High School by the university. During his time as principal, the university has grown from c.4,000 students to just over 20,000 students and turnover has increased from £14M to over £120M. He retired from his position as vice-chancellor at the University of Chester in December 2019. His successor is Professor Eunice Simmons, the first female vice-chancellor in the university's history.

== Personal life ==
He is married with three daughters and four grandchildren, lives in Cheshire and enjoys music, theatre and the arts.

Academic offices
Preceded by New position	Vice-Chancellor of the University of Chester; 2005–2019	Succeeded by Professor Eunice Simmons
