= Thomas Walmsley and Sons =

Company that manufactured wrought iron

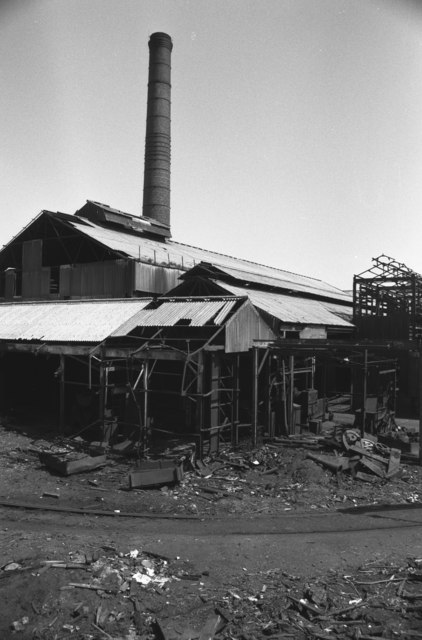
The Atlas Forge rolling mill

Thomas Walmsley and Sons was a company that manufactured wrought iron. It was founded in 1866 or 1869 by Thomas Walmsley at the Atlas Forge on a site bounded by Bridgeman Street and Fletcher Street in Bolton, then in Lancashire, England. The forge had at least 16 puddling furnaces and forging and rolling mills.

In 1874 a Rastrick boiler at the forge exploded, causing six fatalities.

Production lasted for more than 100 years until 1975 when it was the last plant in the United Kingdom to produce wrought iron. Much of the plant, the wrought iron rolling mill, the Rastrick boiler and the steam engine that powered it were preserved in working order by the Ironbridge Gorge Museum Trust for its Blists Hill museum where it is used to demonstrate the process to visitors. A steam hammer supplied to the company by Nasmyth & Wilson of Patricroft is preserved outside Bolton University.

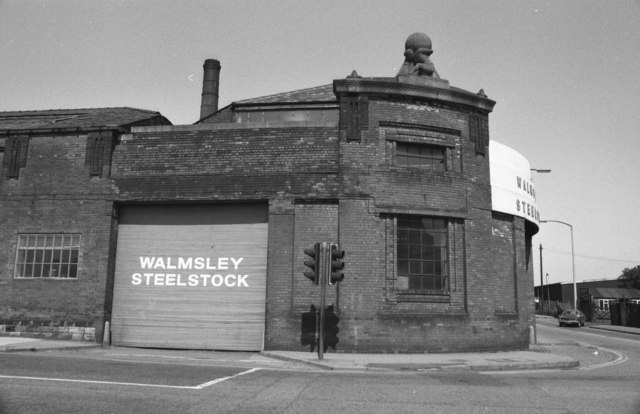
Atlas Forge and the figure of Atlas, as steel stockholders in 1983

After 1975 the company became steel stockholders as 'Walmsley Steelstock' and closed in 1984.

== Walmsley family ==
Thomas Walmsley was born in 1812 and became an iron agent and tinplate worker in 1845 in Oxford Street, Bolton. In 1869 he was an agent for the Grosmont pig iron and Bowling Iron Company from the Phoenix Ironworks in Crook Street. He had set up his own iron works by 1869. He was Mayor of Bolton from 1869 to 1871. He died in 1890 and the business passed to his son, Richard and subsequently to Richard's sons, Reginald and Ernest.
