= George Holmes (vice-chancellor) =

British academic administrator (born 1961)

George Holmes DL
- Occupation: Former Academic administrator
- Years active: 2006–2026
- Employer: University of Bolton afterwards University of Greater Manchester
- Honours: Order of Saint Agatha
- Website: www.bolton.ac.uk

George Edward Thomas Holmes DL (born 1 May 1961) is a former British academic administrator, previously serving as Vice-Chancellor of the University of Greater Manchester from 2006 to 2025.

== Life ==
Son of a Yorskhire property developer, Holmes graduated with a BSc in economics (Londin), before receiving a Master's degree in Business Administration (MBA) then an Honorary Doctorate of Education (Hon Ed.D.) from the University of Bolton.

Principal of Doncaster College, then Deputy Vice-Chancellor of the University of North London (now London Metropolitan University), Holmes served as the Vice-Chancellor of the University of Greater Manchester from 2006 but was suspended in 2025.

Elected a Fellow of the Institute of Directors, Holmes serves as a DL for Greater Manchester since 2015, and was appointed a Knight Commander of the Order of Saint Agatha by the Republic of San Marino in 2021 "for charitable work".

In 2025, whistleblowers from the University of Greater Manchester alerted online newspaper The Mill to unusual financial activities between Holmes and a senior university executive named Joseph Wheeler. Following the article, local MP Phil Brickell wrote to the Education Secretary and the Office for Students "asking for an independent and thorough investigation into the university". The University of Greater Manchester confirmed that Wheeler had left the university "with immediate effect" on 7 February 2025 following separate allegations of racism. Following this, it was announced on 13 May 2025 that Holmes had been suspended as Vice-Chancellor, and on 5 August 2026 it was confirmed that the University terminated his contract. He remains subject to an ongoing Police investigation into financial impropriety.

In 1991 he married Elizabeth Chappell. His partner Louise Burrows was arrested in 2026 at the same time as Holmes.
