= Edmund Vivian Gabriel =

Sir Colonel Edmund Vivian Gabriel CSI, CMG, CVO, CBE, VD, FSA
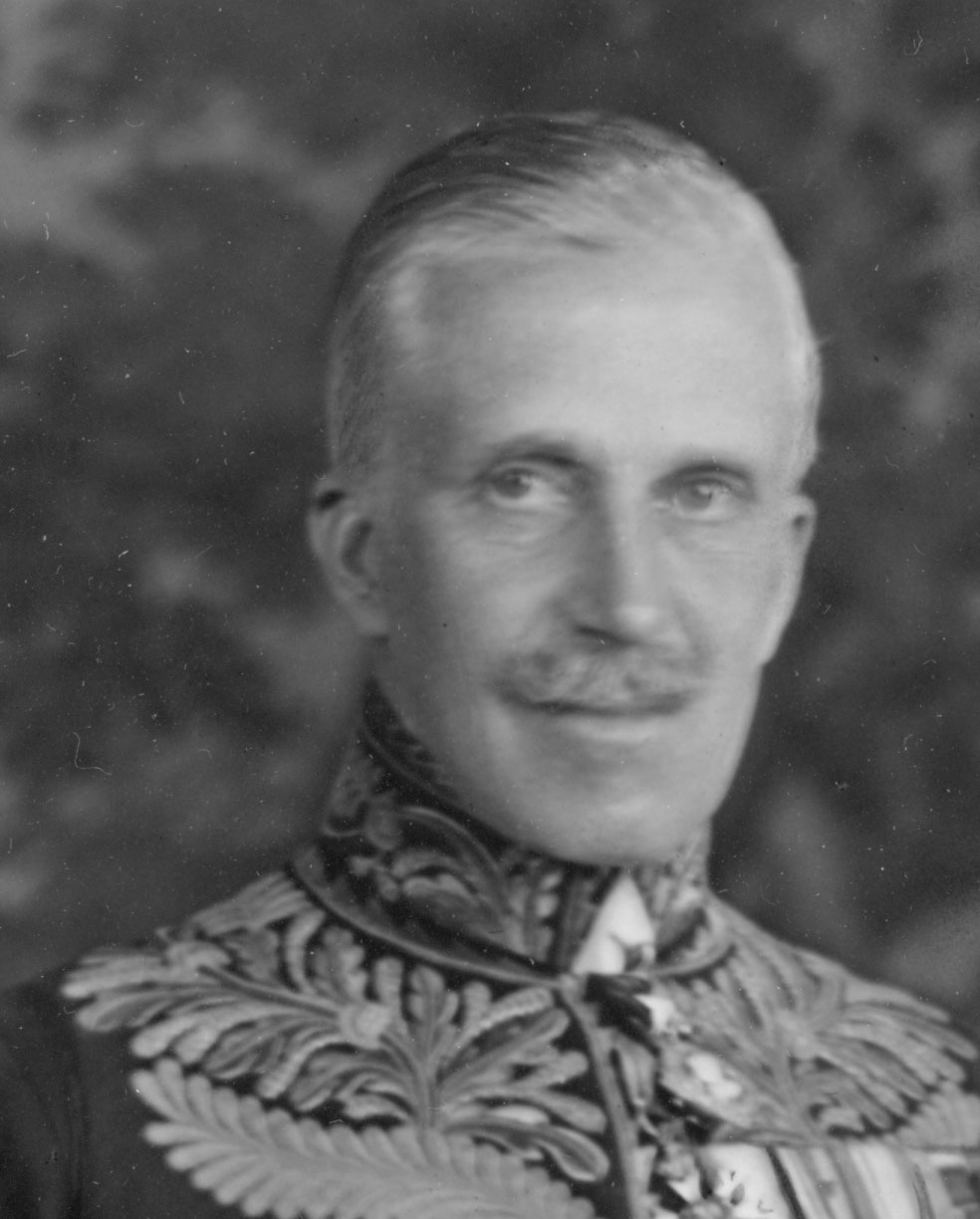
- Gabriel in 1924
- Born: 28 March 1875; Gunnersbury, Middlesex, UKGBI
- Died: 13 February 1950 (aged 74); Government House, St. John's, British West Indies (now Antigua and Barbuda)
- Education: Emmanuel College, Cambridge, BA, 1896
- Spouse: Mabel McAfee (m. 1924)

Sir Colonel Edmund Vivian Gabriel CSI, CMG, CVO, CBE, VD, FSA (28 March 1875 – 13 February 1950) was a British civil servant, army officer, courtier and art collector.

== Early life and education ==
Gabriel was born on 28 March 1875 in Gunnersbury, Middlesex (present-day London) to Edmund William Gabriel, an Irish merchant shipper, and Ellen Anne Gabriel (née Pike). Educated at Emmanuel College, Cambridge, Gabriel graduated in 1896.

== Career ==
In 1897, Gabriel entered the Indian Civil Service and the Indian Political Service in 1913. In his early years he served as attaché to the 1903 Coronation Durbar, Political Advisor to Chandra Shamsher Jang Bahadur Rana, Prime Minister of Nepal (1907), Resident of Western Rajputana States (1908), and Chief Secretary, North-West Frontier Province (1910).

During the First World War he was first assigned to the Imperial General Staff, War Office, in London, where he was closely associated with Lord Kitchener, then Secretary of State for War. He subsequently joined the British Military Mission with the Italian Royal Army, as the head of the intelligence section, and later served as liaison officer to the naval forces in the Aegean Sea (British Aegean Squadron).

In February 1917, he attended the demonstration of a new mortar in an open staff car in the company of some Italian Generals. The mortar exploded, killing five men and seriously injuring another. He insisted that the wounded man should be taken to hospital immediately. He later received a letter from the italian Government thanking him. The man whose life he saved with his prompt action was Benito Mussolini.

Later, he was deployed to Cairo and assigned to the Egyptian Expeditionary Force. On 11 December 1917, he entered Jerusalem with General Edmund Allenby and was appointed financial advisor and assistant administrator of Palestine (then known as Occupied Enemy Territory Administration South).

After the war he moved to Britain and maintained his services with the Territorial Army, reaching the rank of colonel. His London residence was 40, Wilton Crescent.

In 1925, he was appointed to King George V's household as a Gentleman Usher in Ordinary, a title he maintained until his death. In the 1937 Coronation Honours he was knighted by King George VI. During the Second World War he was a member of the British Air Commission to the United States of America.

Edmund Vivian Gabriel descended from the Gabrielli, a noble Italian family from Gubbio, a branch of which had settled in England in the 17th century. He maintained there a residence at 10, via Ducale, was honorary curator of the local Palazzo Ducale, and supported the restoration of local artifacts and buildings. In the 1920s he decided to bequeath the collection of art he had gathered during his stay in Asia to the municipality of Gubbio: the Vivian Gabriel Oriental Collection of Tibetan, Nepalese, Chinese and Indian Art is today exposed in the Palazzo dei Consoli in the Umbrian hilltown.

For this and his services during the war he was appointed by King Victor Emmanuel III Officer, Order of the Crown of Italy, and Officer, Order of Saints Maurice and Lazarus. In 1929, Gabriel became a Knight of Justice (from Knights of Grace) of the Venerable Order of Saint John of Jerusalem. He was also awarded the Order of Saint Agatha by the Republic of San Marino.

In 1926, Sir Vivian acquired the site of the Inn of the Tongue of England in the Old Town of Rhodes in the Dodecanese. It was in turn given by his heirs to the ‘People of Greece’ in 1972.

His portrait by John Newman Holroyd is exposed at the Museum of the Order of St John in London.

== Personal life ==
On 11 December 1924, Gabriel married Mabel Gabriel (née McAfee, formerly Preston) at Saint Thomas Church in Manhattan.

Gabriel died on 13 February 1950 at Government House in St. John's, Antigua aged 74.

== Bibliography ==
- Vivian Gabriel. The troubles of the Holy Land, London, 1922
