= North West Universities Association =

Former representative body of english universities

The North West Universities Association (NWUA) was a representative body in the North West of England, intended to advance the development of the thirteen higher education establishments. The Association ceased operation on the 30th June 2012.

== Role ==
The primary aim of the NWUA was to act as an organisation through which the universities of the North West can identify common goals, and thus move forward together through collaborative action, thereby maximising their contribution to the social, economic and cultural life of the North West of England and managing to develop partnerships with business, industry and public bodies in this process.

A more general aim of the NWUA was to attempt to foster better overall relations between the institutions of the North West, and establish a lasting relationship.

NWUA also ran the Leonardo da Vinci programme, the European Commission's vocational training programme which aims to facilitate student and staff mobility throughout Europe. The programme provided funding for students to undertake a work placement related to their academic study in another European country and for staff to visit European institutions and companies to exchange knowledge and develop vocational training.

The NWUA was affiliated with the UK Government, the North West Regional Assembly, the North West Regional Development Agency, the Chamber of Commerce, CBI, the North West Science Council, and other organisations, who assist in promoting the collective ambitions of the establishments.

== Member institutes ==
NWUA had thirteen members:

- University of Bolton
- University of Central Lancashire
- University of Chester
- University of Cumbria
- Edge Hill University
- Lancaster University
- University of Liverpool
- Liverpool Hope University
- Liverpool John Moores University
- University of Manchester
- Manchester Metropolitan University
- Royal Northern College of Music
- University of Salford
