= University of Chester =

Public university in England

- Coat of arms
- Former name: List: Chester Diocesan Training College (1839–1963) Chester College of Education (1963–1974) Chester College of Higher Education (1974–1996) University College Chester (1996–1999) Chester, a College of the University of Liverpool (1999–2003) University College Chester (2003–2005)
- Motto: Latin: Qui docet in doctrina
- Motto in English: "He that teacheth, on teaching"
- Type: Public
- Established: 1839; 187 years ago (gained university status in 2005)
- Affiliations: AACSB; ACU; Cathedrals Group; Universities UK
- Endowment: £395,000 (2018)
- Budget: £118.3 million
- Chancellor: Dame Jenny Harries
- Vice-Chancellor: Eunice Simmons
- Faculty: 870
- Administrative staff: 1220
- Students: 14,900
- Undergraduates: 10,800
- Postgraduates: 4,100
- Location: Chester, Ellesmere Port and Warrington, Cheshire and Shrewsbury, Shropshire, England, UK; 53°12′01″N 2°53′53″W
- Campus: Urban
- Colours: Burgundy
- Website: chester.ac.uk

The University of Chester is a public university located in Chester, England. The university originated as the first purpose-built teacher training college in the UK. As a university, it now occupies seven campus sites in and around Chester, one in Warrington, and a University Centre in Birkenhead. It offers a range of foundation, undergraduate and postgraduate courses, as well as undertaking academic research.

The university is a member of AACSB, the Association of Commonwealth Universities, the Cathedrals Group, the North West Universities Association and Universities UK. It holds an overall Silver Award in the 2023 Teaching Excellence Framework (TEF).

A 2021 article in Times Higher Education described the University of Chester as being the fifth-oldest higher education establishment in England, with only the universities of Oxford, Cambridge, Durham and London predating it.

== History ==
=== 1839 to 2000 ===
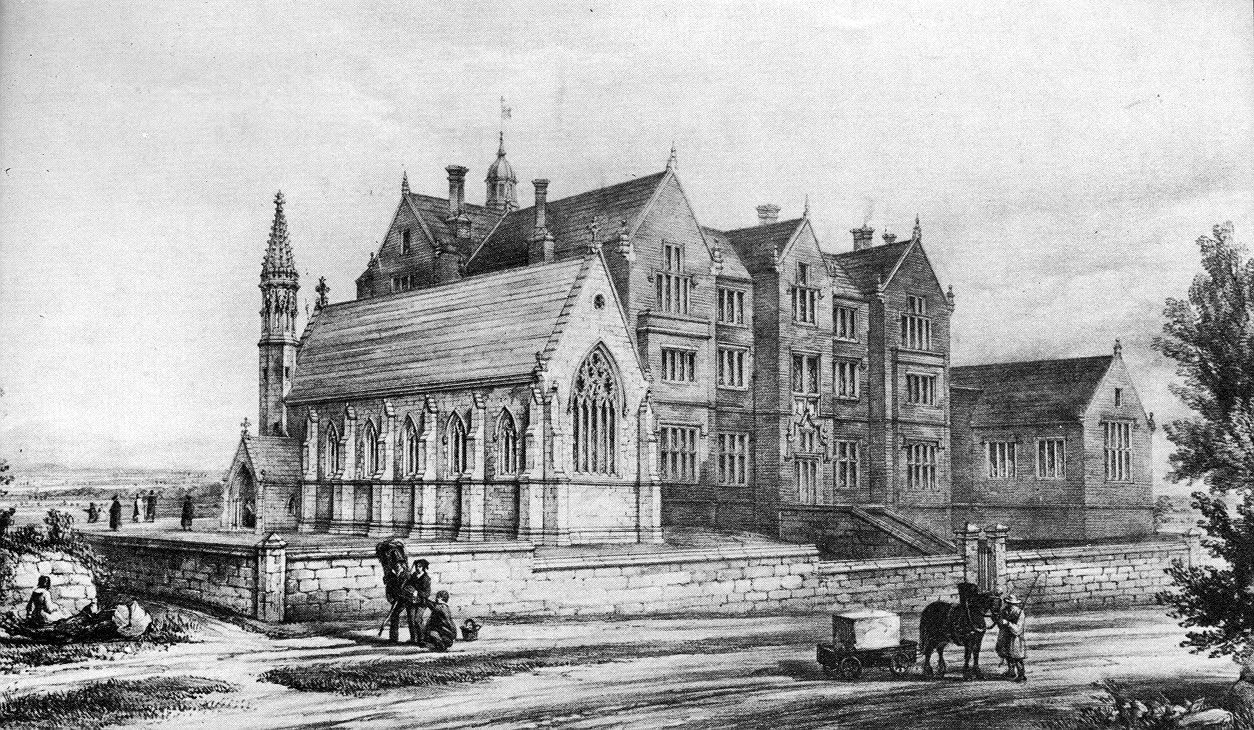
The original College building (still in use and now known as Old College) in 1843, a year after it opened

The university was founded as Chester Diocesan Training College in 1839 by a distinguished group of local leading figures in the Church of England, including future Prime Ministers William Ewart Gladstone and the 14th Earl of Derby. It was the UK's first purpose-built teacher training college, which makes it one of the longest established higher education institutions in the country. In 1842, Gladstone opened the college's original buildings for its first intake of ten male student teachers on the Parkgate Road site, (just outside the City Walls), that the university occupies today.

In 1921, Chester formally became an affiliated college of the University of Liverpool, which meant that the University of Liverpool awarded Chester's qualifications and Chester's students were able to use Liverpool's facilities.

The institution was threatened with closure in the 1930s, but its future was secured by the Bishop of Chester in 1933. From then on, the college continued to grow steadily. By the 1960s, as the UK was massively expanding its higher education capacity in reaction to the Robbins Report, the college was considered as a possible candidate for university status. These proposals, however, were not followed through.

The college continued to expand and women were first admitted in 1961. In 1963, the government renamed teacher training colleges to colleges of education, so Chester's name became Chester College of Education. In 1974, the number of courses was expanded beyond teacher education to include Bachelor of Arts and Bachelor of Science degrees. To reflect its wider remit, the college was renamed Chester College of Higher Education.

In the early 1990s the School of Nursing and Midwifery (now the Faculty of Health and Social Care) was established. The college also began to offer a Bachelor of Theology degree, HNDs and more postgraduate courses, such as master's degrees and PhDs. It also embarked on a £10 million campus improvement programme. By 1996, Chester had earned the right to call itself University College Chester. This name, however, was short-lived as the government changed the requirements for university colleges in 1999 to include only those that had their own degree-awarding powers. Thus, Chester had to drop the 'University College' tag and reverted to the title Chester College of Higher Education, though the more descriptive Chester, a College of the University of Liverpool was frequently used in publicity material.

=== 2000 to present ===
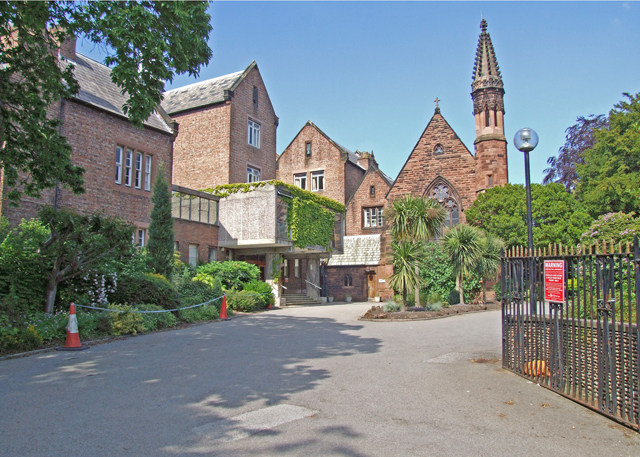
Old College now forms part of the University of Chester's Exton Park Campus

The college expanded in 2002 through the acquisition of the higher education faculty and campus of Warrington Collegiate Institute. (The further and adult education campuses of Warrington remained independent and were known as Warrington Collegiate until August 2017, when it merged with Mid Cheshire College.)

In 2003 Chester was granted its own degree-awarding powers, allowing it to be known as University College Chester once again. Due to its long (and well-advertised) association with the University of Liverpool, Chester continued to award Liverpool degrees until the 2005 intake of students.

In 2005, University College Chester was awarded full university status and became the University of Chester. This was followed by the right to award its own research degrees in 2007, ending Chester's last validation arrangement with Liverpool.

Following the 2008 Research Assessment Exercise, some of the university's research was declared to be of international quality, with a proportion of 'World Leading' research in History (15% of submitted research), English, Sports Studies, and Drama (each 5% of submitted research).

In 2010, the Centre for Work Related Studies (CWRS) received a commendation by the UK quality body, for its radically flexible and high quality negotiated work based learning framework - enabling professionals to customise their own qualifications, 'learn through work', and enable rapid accreditation of commercial training provision. At the same time, the funding body showcased CWRS's flexible approach to accrediting workplace learning.

=== Expansion ===
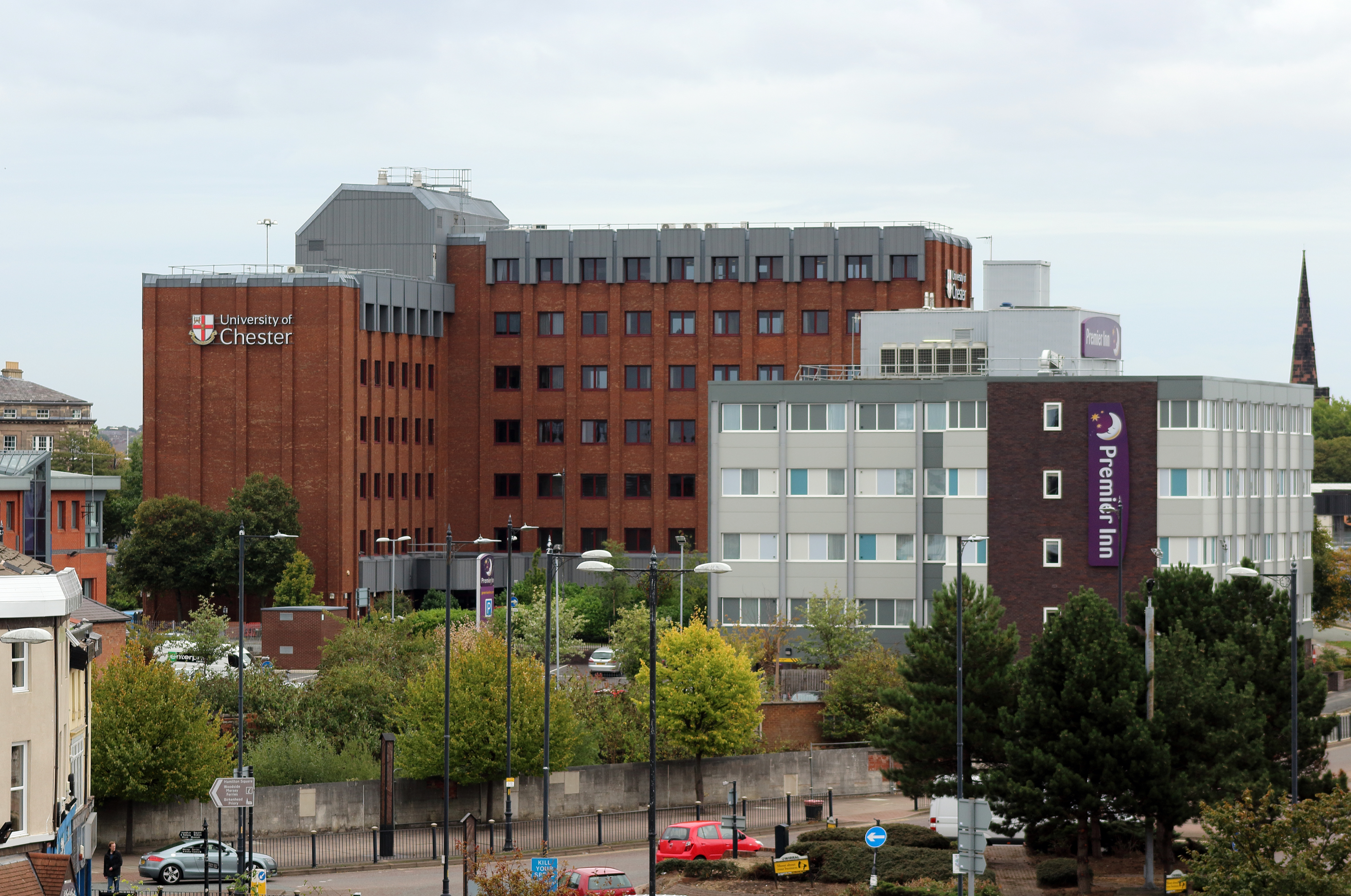
University of Chester, Marriss House (at left)

The university has expanded in recent years, buying buildings in Chester and constructing student accommodation at Parkgate Road Campus in 2013.

In 2013 the university took over the Shell Technology Centre at Thornton-le-Moors from Shell UK, former owners of the adjacent Stanlow Oil Refinery. The Thornton Science Park, as it was renamed, was opened in 2014 by George Osborne, then the Chancellor of the Exchequer. The Science Park was used for a variety of science and engineering-based courses. However, following guidance from the Health and Safety Executive, in 2018 the local authority Cheshire West and Chester Council refused a retrospective planning application for continued use for educational purposes on safety grounds, due to the proximity to the refinery.

In 2014, Loyd Grossman, who holds an honorary degree from the university, officially opened the North West Food Research Development (NoWFOOD) Centre.

== Campuses ==
The University of Chester has seven campuses and University Centres in Warrington and Birkenhead. The 32-acre (130,000 m^{2}) Exton Park Campus, Chester, is located on Parkgate Road, just north of the City Walls. It has a mixture of Victorian buildings (such as Old College, which includes a chapel built by some of the original students in the 1840s) and modern buildings (such as the Students' Union). The Parkgate Road Campus also features a fitness centre, sports hall, swimming pool, science and language laboratories and bar.

Some departments are housed offsite at locations within walking distance of the main campus, for example, the Department of English is located in a Grade II-listed former Victorian vicarage, while the Law School is based at 67 Liverpool Road. The former County Hall, which is located in the city centre near the racecourse, houses the School of Nursing and Midwifery and the School of Law and Social Justice and is known as the Wheeler Building. The university has also developed the Kingsway, Creative Campus in Newton with the addition of a three-storey teaching block, ground floor exhibition space and art gallery, learning resource centre and changing rooms. The site features a number of green innovations, such as ground source heating.

The university acquired a former Lloyds Bank corporate headquarters in Queen's Park, Handbridge, Chester in 2015. This houses the Chester Business School. The university has modernised the facilities in Bridge House and Churchill House to cater for 2,700 students.

The former Warrington campus originally hosted a camp for Canadian officers in World War II and was located in the Padgate area of Warrington. This campus included the North West Media Centre, which has close ties to Granada Television, The Warrington School of Management, Social Sciences and Health and Social Care. The Warrington Campus was also the training ground for the rugby league team The Warrington Wolves, and Warrington town was the host for the Rugby League World Cup 2013, with the Campus hosting the Samoan players. In 2022 two new buildings, Time Square and Remond House, were opened in Warrington Town Centre.

The university also has a number of bases at NHS sites across Cheshire and the Wirral, and opened University Centre Birkenhead in September 2018.

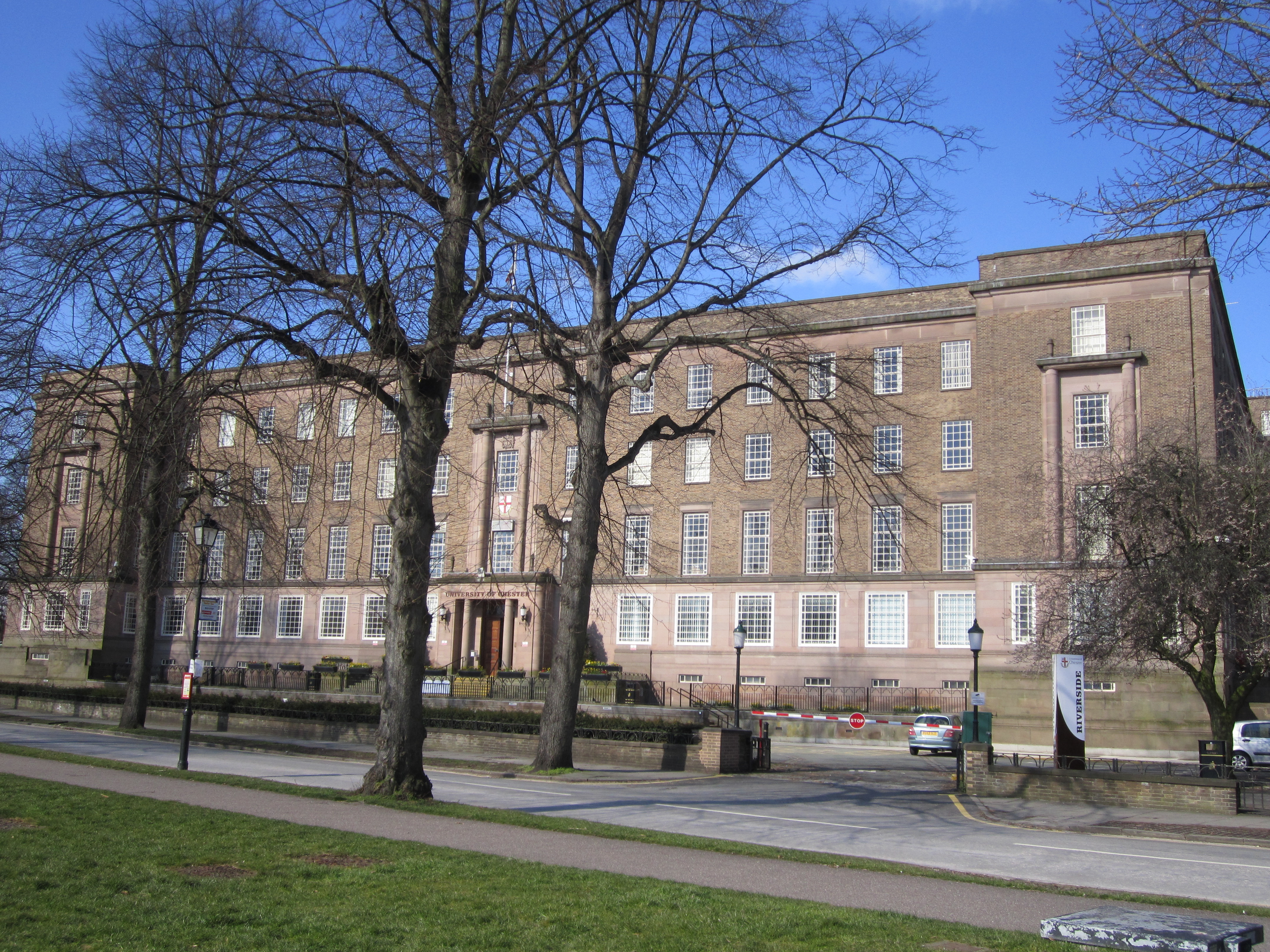
University of Chester Riverside Campus

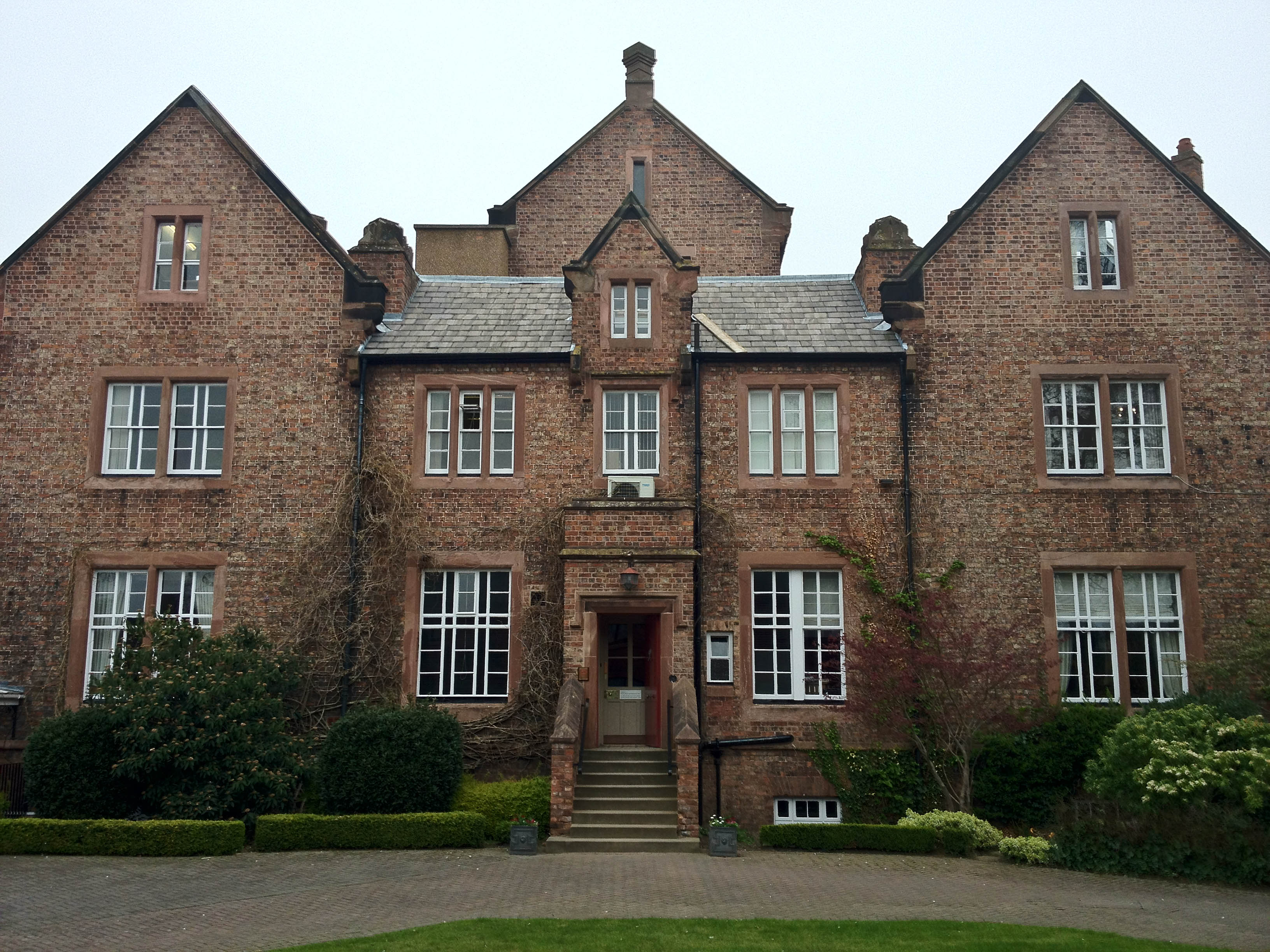
Senate House, Parkgate Road Campus, Chester

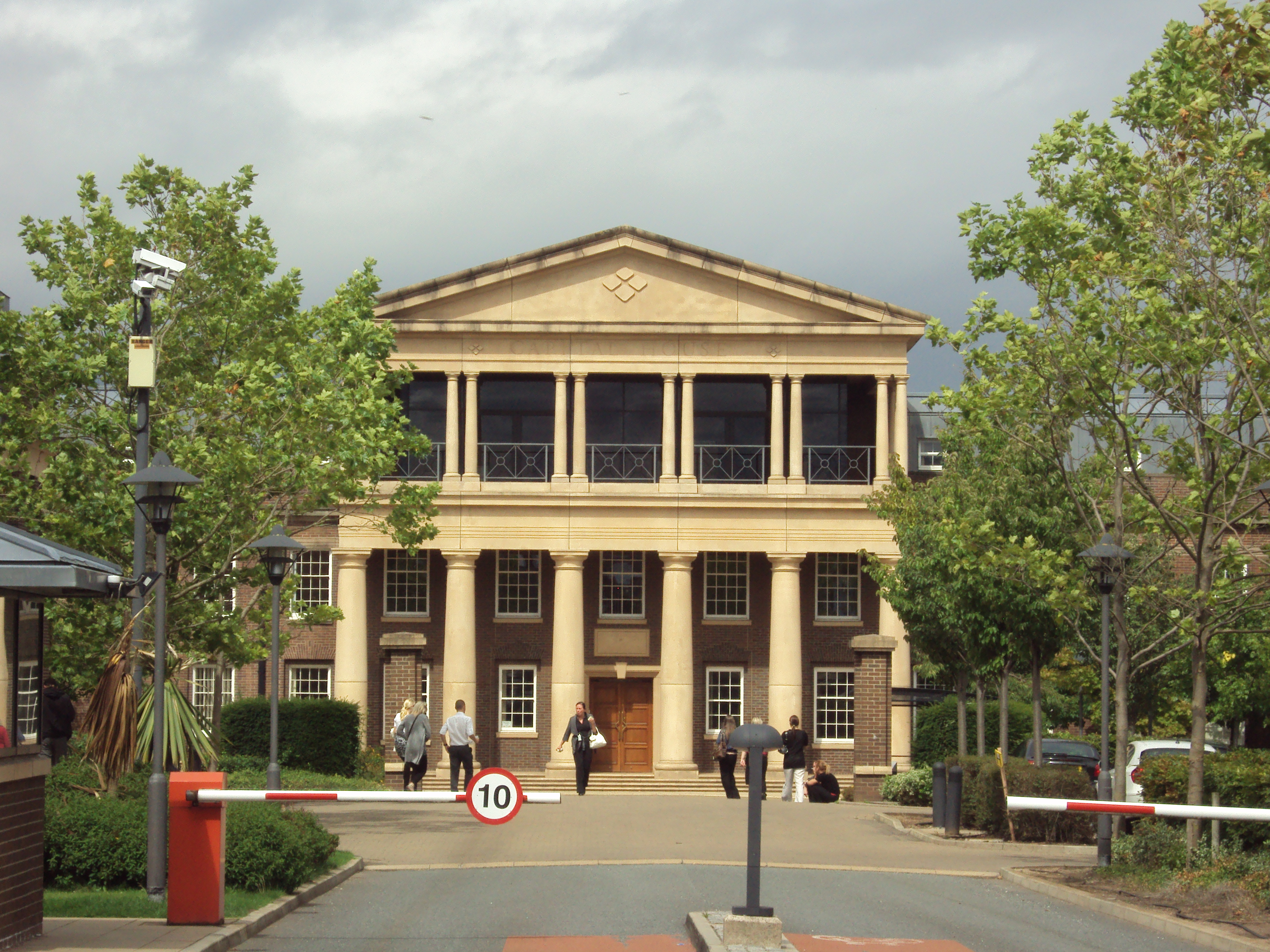
The University of Chester's Business School.

== Organisation and structure ==
The university is organised into three faculties of study. Several of these are subdivided into academic Schools and Divisions. The Faculties and Schools are:

Faculty of Arts, Humanities and Social Sciences

- Chester School of Education
- School of Humanities and Social Sciences
- School for the Creative Industries
- School of Law and Social Justice

Faculty of Health, Medicine and Society

- Chester Medical School
- School of Allied and Public Health
- School of Nursing and Midwifery
- School of Society

Faculty of Science, Business and Enterprise

- Chester Business School
- School of Computer and Engineering Sciences
- School of Natural Sciences

In addition, a number of research centres operate alongside the departments.

From 2015 to 2020 the University of Chester provides validation for PhD programmes offered by Glyndŵr University.

=== Coat of arms ===
Shield of the University of Chester

The university's coat of arms was granted by the College of Arms in 1954. The arms, pictured above, are made up of an argent shield featuring the St George's cross on which there is a golden wheatsheaf, representing the Earldom of Cheshire. In the first quarter of the shield is a clasped open book, symbolising learning. The crest features a mitre, signifying the institution's founding by the Church of England, in front of two crossed swords, which are taken from the County of Cheshire's coat of arms. The golden scroll contains the Latin motto, "qui docet in doctrina", an extract from Saint Paul's epistle to the Romans and translates as "he that teacheth, on teaching" or "let the teacher teach".

The coat of arms was used as the college's logo until the early 1990s when a new logo, with a depiction of the Old College building, was introduced. The coat of arms returned to the college's logo in 2002 when a simplified version became part of the logo. The university's current logo, introduced in 2005, features the shield and scroll from the coat of arms.

From 2015, as part of the 175th-anniversary celebrations, the university's coat of arms was changed to include supporting griffins on either side – one in gold, and one in black reach referencing one of the institution's founders. The gold griffin of Edward Smith-Stanley, 14th Earl of Derby bears the University Mace. The Black griffin of William Gladstone bears a sword. Each gorged with a collar of university colours red and white.

== Academic profile ==
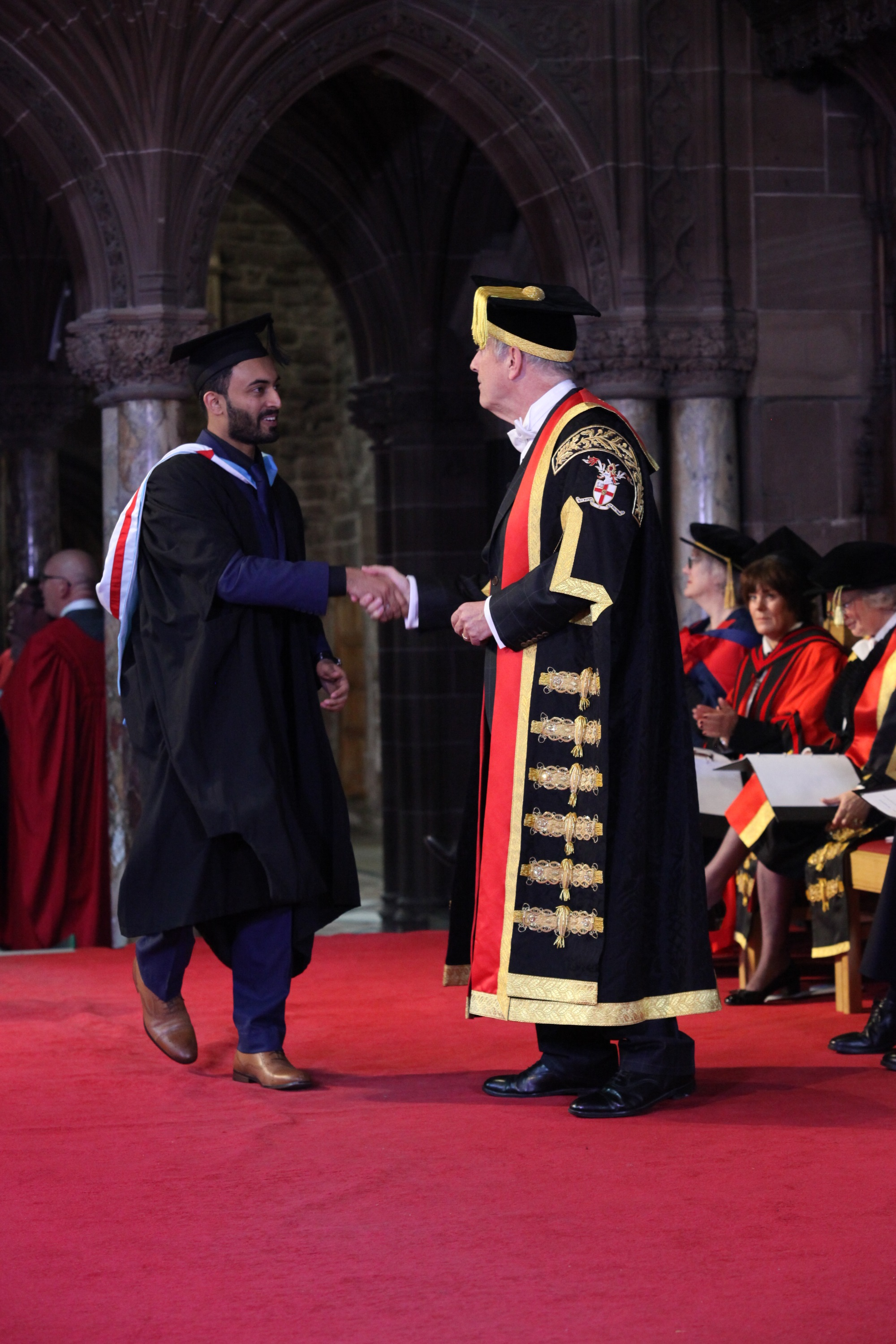
The University of Chester holds its annual graduation ceremony in Chester Cathedral, presided over by the Chancellor Gyles Brandreth

There are approximately 1,737 administrative and academic members of staff. Many take part in research and often publish their work through the institution's own publishing house, the University of Chester Press. The 2014 Research Assessment Exercise resulted in Chester's research being declared world-leading in 14 areas of that submitted.

Former Archbishop of Canterbury Rowan Williams was, in 2011, bestowed a visiting professorship with the title Gladstone Professor of Literature and Theology. His inaugural lecture 'The Messiah and the novelist: approaches to Jesus in fiction' took place in Chester Cathedral.

Peter Blair and Ashley Chantler edit "Flash: The International Short-Short Story Magazine", a major literary periodical, which publishes stories and reviews of up to 360 words by writers from around the world.

At the beginning of April 2021, the university announced its intention to make up to 86 compulsory redundancies across staff in the Humanities department. The University and College Union has strongly condemned these plans, and student protests in opposition to the measures have taken place throughout the city.

=== Reputation and rankings ===
Rankings
National rankings
- Complete (2027): 74
- Guardian (2027): 61
- Times / Sunday Times (2027): 92

Global rankings
- THE (2026): 1501+

The Quality Assurance Agency for Higher Education (QAA) 2010 audit praised the university for its good practice in ensuring standards and enhancing the quality of learning opportunities, the supportive relationships that underpin the learning and working in the institution and the strength of its partnership work.

The Faculty of Education and Children's Services also celebrated an 'outstanding' outcome in its recent Ofsted inspection of Initial Teacher Training.

== Student life ==
Chester Students' Union (CSU) offers services and provides facilities for students and is a member of the NUS. Three sabbatical officers are elected each year and serve a maximum of two years. The executive committee are the trustees of the Union. Members are elected each year before the end of March, with a president and vice-president, and each with a different role, such as Education representative, Activities representative and a Warrington representative. The support staff for the Union consists of a number of full-time employees, part-time student staff and volunteers from the elected Executive Committee and the Union Council.

The Union also runs over 110 sports clubs and societies; with each campus having its own teams, many of which compete in British Universities and Colleges Sport competitions. Once a year, the Union runs an inter-campus competition known as Varsity on campus where sporting societies, such as seven-a-side football, and non-sporting societies, such as poker, compete. Non-sporting societies include the Debating Society (which has hosted hustings events which have featured on 'BBC North West Tonight'), the Politics Forum, the Drama Society, the Amnesty International Society, the International Development Society and the People and Planet Society.

== Student body ==
Most of Chester's 14,900 students are from the United Kingdom. A quarter of students are mature and there are twice as many female students as male (partially due to the number of nursing, midwifery and teaching students). The increasing number of foreign students are mainly participants in the university's active exchange policy.

== Notable people ==
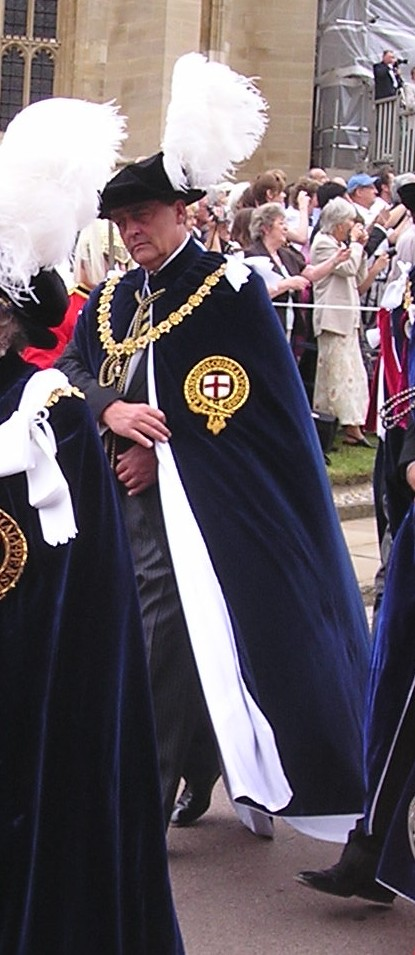
Gerald Grosvenor, 6th Duke of Westminster, served as the Foundation Chancellor of the University of Chester

=== Chancellors ===
- 2005–2016: Major General Gerald Grosvenor, 6th Duke of Westminster
- 2016-2025: Gyles Brandreth
- 2025–present: Dame Jenny Harries

=== Vice-chancellor/ Principals ===
Until university status was awarded in 2005, the Vice-Chancellor was known as the principal.

- 1839–1869: Arthur Rigg
- 1869–1886: J. M. Chritchley
- 1886–1890: A. J. C. Allen
- 1890–1910: John Best
- 1910–1935: Richard Thomas
- 1935–1953: Stanley Astbury
- 1953–1965: Aubrey Price
- 1966–1971: Bernard de Bunsen
- 1971–1987: Malcolm Seaborne
- 1987–1998: Ned Binks
- 1998–2019: Timothy Wheeler (Foundation Vice-Chancellor and Principal)
- 2020–present: Eunice Simmons

=== Staff ===
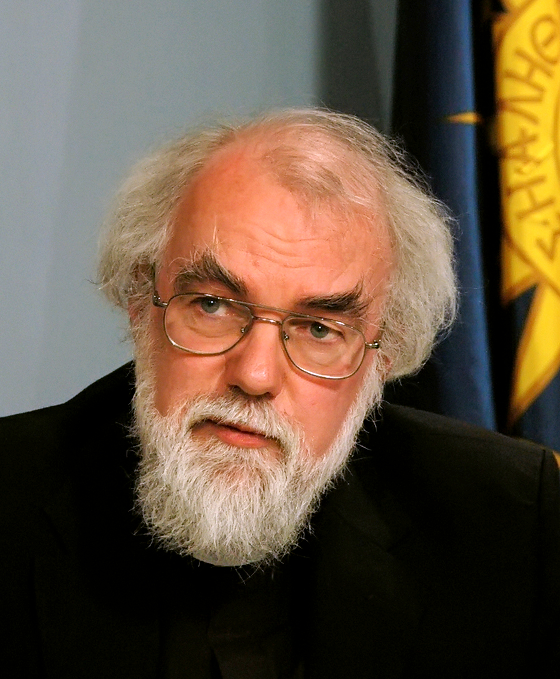
The former Archbishop of Canterbury, Rowan Williams, is a visiting professor at the University of Chester.

- Rowan Williams, Anglican bishop, theologian and poet
- Stewart Ainsworth, archaeologist (Department of History and Archaeology, 2010–present)
- Sir William Crookes, chemist (1855-unknown)
- Elaine Graham, theologian (Department of Theology and Religious Studies, 2009–present)
- Ron Geaves, theologian (Department of Theology and Religious Studies, 2001–2007)
- Anthony Thiselton, theologian (Department of Theology and Religious Studies, 2001–2006)
- Gordon Turnbull, psychiatrist (Centre for Research and Education in Psychological Trauma)
- Alan Wall, novelist (Department of English, 2004–present)
- Howard Williams, archaeologist (Department of History and Archaeology, 2008–present)

=== Alumni ===
- Alan Bleasdale, screenwriter (Cert Ed, 1964–1967)
- Jim Bowen, Bullseye presenter (Cert Ed Physical Education, 1957–1959)
- Sir Dave Brailsford CBE, Performance Director of British Cycling and General Manager of Team Sky, (BSc (Hons), Sports Science and Psychology, 1987–1990)
- Duffy, singer and actress
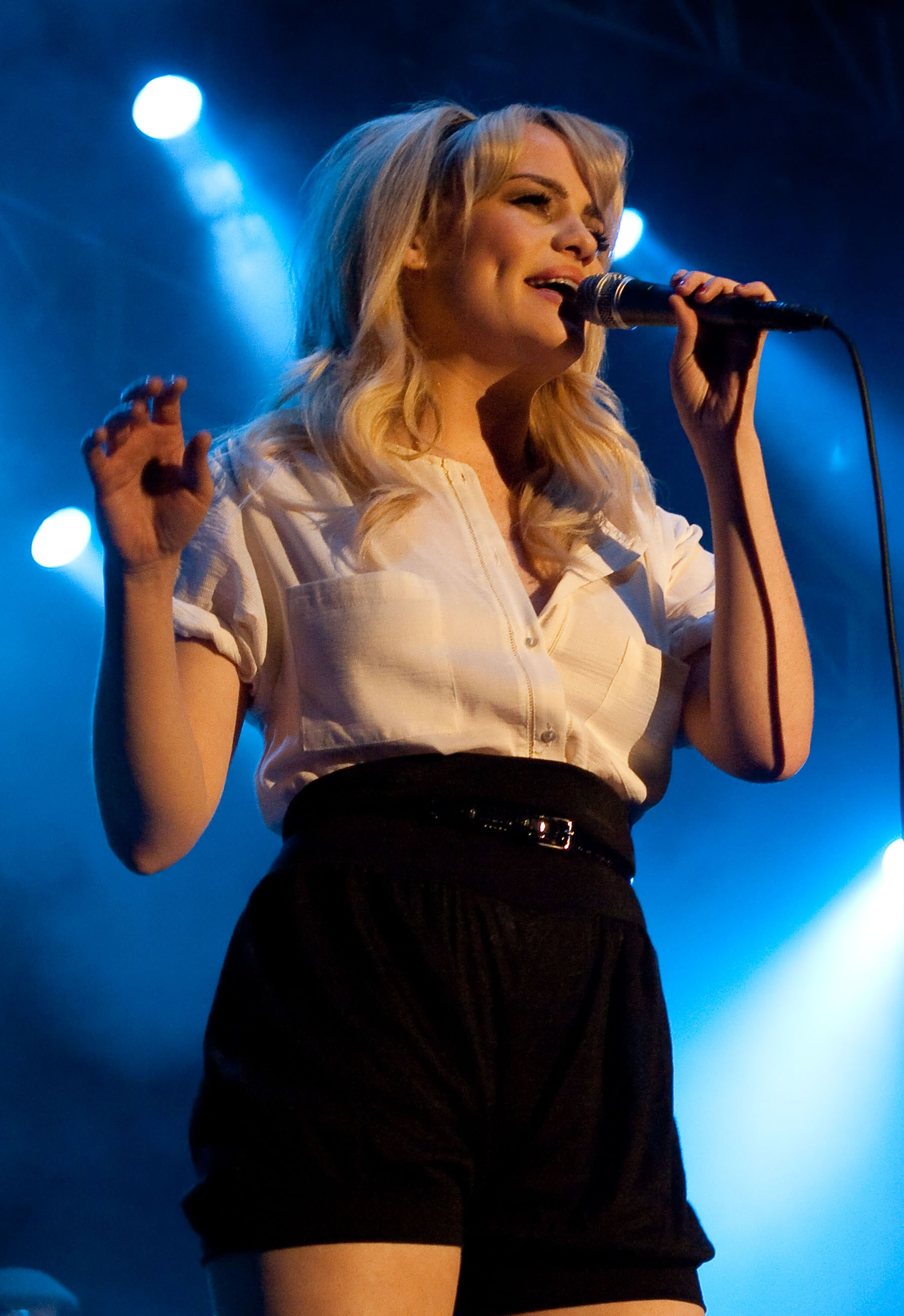
  Singer Duffy studied Commercial Music Production at the University of Chester
- John Carleton, international rugby union player
- Jon Clarke, international rugby league player (BSc (Hons) Sport and Exercise Sciences, 2006–2010)
- George Courtney MBE, international football referee (Cert Ed Geography, 1959–1961)
- Alan Emery, geneticist (CertEd, 1945–1947)
- Jo Fletcher, international footballer (MSc Exercise and Nutrition Science, 2003–2005)
- Matt Greenhalgh, film director and screenwriter (BA(Hons) Media Studies with Business Management and Information Technology, 1992–1995)
- Dick Howard, international footballer (HND Physical Education, 1963–1965)
- Roderick Hunt MBE, children's author (Cert Ed Divinity and English, 1957–1959)
- Helen Jones MP, politician (PGCE)
- Lucy Letby, neonatal nurse, serial killer (studied nursing)
- Eddie Lever, footballer and manager (Cert Ed, 1931–1933)
- J. Thomas Looney, deviser of the Oxfordian theory regarding William Shakespeare (Cert Ed, 1890–1891)
- Tracey Neville, international netball player (BSc(Hons) Nutrition and Exercise Science, 2004–2007)
- Jon Sleightholme, international rugby union player (1991–1994)
- David 'Comedy Dave' Vitty, radio presenter (BA(Hons) Media Studies and Business Management, 1992–1995)
- Nicola Wilson, equestrian rider BSc(Hons) Sport and Business Management, graduated 1999)
- Sir Walter Winterbottom, footballer and first manager of the England football team (Cert Ed, 1931–1933)
- Rob Wotton, television and radio presenter (BA(Hons) Health and Community Studies, 1987–1990; Union President, 1990–1991)

== See also ==
- Armorial of UK universities
- College of Education
- List of universities in the UK
