= Certificate in Education =

The Certificate in Education (Cert Ed) is a professional qualification for teachers in the United Kingdom. There have been two incarnations of the Cert Ed over the years.

== New Cert Ed ==
The current Cert Ed is a non-compulsory qualification offering training in teaching at further or higher education level.

Those wanting to teach at primary or secondary education must undertake either a Bachelor of Education or a Bachelor of Arts degree, such as a BA (Hons) Primary Education, or Bachelor of Science (in a relevant Education course) degree or a non-education degree followed by a postgraduate qualification in teaching, such as the PGCE.

In 2007, many colleges and Universities stopped teaching the Cert Ed with the advent of the newer Teaching Awards, the Diploma in Teaching in the Lifelong Learning Sector (DTLLS) replacing the full Cert Ed.

== Old Cert Ed ==
The old Cert Ed was a qualification required by teachers, obtained after three years of study at a College of Education. At the end of this period students could complete a fourth year in order to gain a BEd (Hons) degree, although only a minority chose to do so. The Cert Ed was discontinued in the early 1980s when the law required all trainee teachers to train via graduate or post-graduate courses.

== See also ==
- Bachelor of Education
- Diploma of Education
- Certificate (disambiguation)
- Postgraduate Diploma in Education
- Professional Graduate Diploma in Education
