= Juvenal P. Marchisio =

American lawyer

- Marchisio in 1958

Personal details
- Born: December 2, 1902 Brooklyn, New York City
- Died: 7 October 1973 Brooklyn, New York City, New York
- Education: St. John's University, Fordham University
- Occupation: Family Court Judge, Fund Raiser and President of ARI

Juvenal P. Marchisio (December 2, 1902 - October 7, 1973) was an important, non-governmental, figure in Italy's recovery from World War II. He was affiliated with three organizations. In 1944, he took over from Myron C. Taylor, the American Relief for Italy president. He founded Boys' Town of Italy, bringing to that nation a model of childcare from the United States. Finally, recognizing the importance of immigration to the United States and Italy, he founded the American Committee on Italian Migration (ACIM).

== Biography ==
Born in Brooklyn on December 2, 1902. He attended St. John's University where his father taught, and at the Royal University of Genoa, Italy, before studying law at Fordham. Marchisio's father was Secondo Marchisio, a philosophy and Latin professor.

Marchisio was on the faculty at St. Johns from 1921 to 1934, and taught Dantesque literature and government. From 1928 to 1930, he gave a series of popular radio lectures on law and political economy, which helped raise his profile. In 1934 he ran for congress, losing in the primary to eventual winner, Richard J. Tonry. Marchisio supported Italian politics before World War II, for instance speaking out in support of the Italians in the Second Italo-Ethiopian War. In 1937, Marchisio was appointed to a ten-year term as Justice of the Court of Domestic Relations by Mayor Fiorello H. La Guardia. Also at that time he was president of Il Crociato, the Roman Catholic Diocesan Italian newspaper, where he had formerly served as managing editor. He also served as vice president of the Italian Historical Society and was a prominent member of the Knights of Columbus.

In 1944, during World War II, he was appointed by Franklin D. Roosevelt to set up a nationwide organization to organize charity towards Italy, which became American Relief for Italy, and he became its president and fundraiser. In this, he helped send clothing and medical supplies to war torn Italy, even as the war continued. In 1944, he was given the rank of Magistral Knight-Grand Cross of the Sovereign Military Order of Malta, headed by Pope Pius XII. He also received the Silver Medal of Italy, the title of Privy Chamberlains of the Sword and Cape (also granted by Pope Pius XII), and the insignia of Knight Commander of the Order of Merit of the Italian Republic. He raised almost $40 million in supplies and funding for Italians displaced or victimized by World War II. During the early 1940s Marchisio initiated publicity and fundraising for Italy by unifying various charity groups including the Italian Welfare League, Christian Democratic Party, Boy Scouts and Sons of Italy. One of his largest contributions, in cooperation with the Christian Democratic Party, was the establishment of Boys' Town in Italy. Boys' Towns acted as Catholic orphanages for children of war veterans or those abandoned in destroyed cities. Specific efforts were made in order to accommodate the population of children, ensuring stable population growth.

He married Rosina Lawrence in 1939 and she ended her career as an actress. After many personal and professional achievements he died in 1973.
