= Royal Household Long and Faithful Service Medal =

Civil decoration awarded by the British monarch

- Type: Medal
- Presented by: Monarch of the United Kingdom
- Motto: For long and faithful service
- Established: 1872
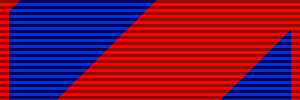
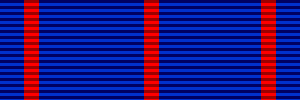
- Victoria ribbon George V ribbon George VI ribbon Elizabeth II ribbon

The Royal Household Long and Faithful Service Medal is a civil decoration awarded by the British monarch to servants of their royal household for long and faithful service. Only those serving in the household of the monarch or their consort (or in a Queen dowager's household) are eligible.

Queen Victoria established the first version of the medal in 1872. Subsequently, George V, George VI and Elizabeth II each instituted their own version of the medal; each constitutes its own separate award, and medals from more than one reign may be worn if the criteria (including time served) are achieved in each reign.

The medal is awarded to only those in service; those working at a more senior level, specifically those who are eligible for appointment to the Royal Victorian Order, are not awarded the medal or bars (though a recipient who is subsequently promoted to a more senior rank retains the medal, along with bars awarded up to that point).

== History ==
=== 19th century ===
The Victoria Faithful Service Medal was established by Queen Victoria in 1872 for those in the Queen's service in recognition of their long and faithful service. It was originally awarded for 25 years' cumulative service, with a clasp awarded for each additional 10 years of service (though it could be awarded sooner at the Queen's discretion). The silver medal bore the Queen's effigy on the obverse and a personalised inscription on the reverse. The medal was suspended from a crowned VR cypher attached to a brooch bar, backed with a Royal Stewart tartan ribbon.

The Queen made the first awards of the medal on her birthday (24 May) that year. Among the first recipients was John Brown, who three months earlier had received a gold version, to an identical design, called the Devoted Service Medal; Mr Brown was the only ever recipient of this particular medal.

=== 20th century ===
No such medal was instituted or awarded by King Edward VII. His successor instituted the George V Long and Faithful Service Medal in May of 1913, twenty years after his marriage to Mary of Teck (which was the date when their Household had been independently established). The service time required was lowered to 20 years' cumulative service by King George V. Servants who had been in the King or Queen's service (including prior to his accession) were eligible for the award.

Edward VIII did not issue his own medal (though a number of belated awards of his father's medal were made during his brief reign). The George VI Long and Faithful Service Medal was first issued in 1943 (seven years into that king's reign); at his request the design was the same as his father's medal (but incorporating the new king's effigy and cypher) and the medal ribbon was the same but reversed. Under George VI, service in the households of previous monarchs could also count towards the medal.

The Queen Elizabeth II Long and Faithful Service Medal was first issued in the year of her accession, 1952. Service in her own royal household, as well as in the household of her husband, her mother or her grandmother, all counted towards the award of a medal (as did service in the households of her predecessors as monarch, if not already recognised by the award of a medal or bar).

== Design ==
On versions of the medal instituted since King George V the obverse depicts the profile of the reigning monarch and the reverse has the inscription "FOR LONG AND FAITHFUL SERVICE". The dates of the original 20 years' service are engraved on the arms of the suspension bar of the medal. The design of the ribbon changes depending on the reigning monarch. Modern versions of the medal have the name of the recipient engraved on the rim of the medal.

In the Order of Wear it falls between the King Charles III Coronation Medal and the Meritorious Service Medal.

== Recipients ==
Notable recipients of the Royal Household Long and Faithful Service Medal include:

=== Queen Victoria version ===
- John Brown
- Charles Colville, Viscount Colville of Culross
- James Hamilton, Duke of Abercorn
- Charles Harbord, Baron Suffield
- Sir Richard Holmes
- Sir Maurice Holzmann
- Susanna Innes-Ker, Duchess of Roxburghe
- Lady Emily Kingscote
- Charlotte Knollys
- Francis Knollys, Viscount Knollys
- Annie MacDonald
- Sir George Maude
- Sir Henry Ponsonby
- Sir Spencer Ponsonby-Fane
- Sir Dighton Probyn

=== King Edward VII version ===
- Francis Charteris, Earl of Wemyss
- Sir Stanley Clarke
- Lord Edward Clinton
- Sir Henry Ewart
- Sir James Reid
- Sir Harry Stonor

=== George V version ===
- Sir Edward Bacon
- Frank Beck
- Sir William Carington
- Sir George Crichton
- Richard Curzon, Earl Howe
- Sir Arthur Davidson
- Sir John Fortescue
- Sir Sidney Greville
- Sir Philip Hunloke
- Sir Henry Legge
- Frederick Ponsonby, Baron Sysonby
- Sir Harry Verney
- Clive Wigram, Baron Wigram

=== George VI version ===
- Sir Ulick Alexander
- Sir Arthur Erskine
- Sir Edmund Gabriel
- Lord Claud Hamilton
- Alec Hardinge, Baron Hardinge of Penshurst
- Sir Alan Lascelles
- Terence Nugent, Baron Nugent
- Charles Paget, Marquess of Anglesey
- Sir Godfrey Thomas

=== Elizabeth II version ===
- Michael Adeane, Baron Adeane
- Sir Alastair Aird
- Sir Hardy Amies
- Sir Ralph Anstruther
- Sir Richard Bayliss
- Sir Shane Blewitt
- Sir Anthony Blunt
- Sir Harold Campbell
- Torquhil Campbell, Duke of Argyll
- Dame Frances Campbell-Preston
- Martin Charteris, Baron Charteris of Amisfield
- Surésh Dhargalkar
- Oliver Everett
- Michael Fawcett
- Robert Fellowes, Baron Fellowes
- Sir Seymour Gilbart-Denham
- Sir Martin Gilliat
- Charles Goodwyn
- Lord Adam Gordon
- Kathleen Hamilton, Duchess of Abercorn
- Sir Norman Hartnell
- Sir William Heseltine
- Susan Hussey, Baroness Hussey of North Bradley
- Robin Janvrin, Baron Janvrin
- Sir John Johnston
- Angela Kelly
- Robert Lindsay, Earl of Crawford
- Sir Robin Mackworth-Young
- Sir Oliver Millar
- Sir John Miller
- Philip Moore, Baron Moore of Wolvercote
- Dame Mary Morrison
- Sir Michael Peat
- William Peel, Earl Peel
- Sir Arthur Penn
- Helen Percy, Duchess of Northumberland
- Simon Ramsay, Earl of Dalhousie
- Jane Roberts, Lady Roberts
- Sir Malcolm Ross
- Michael Sefi
- Cynthia Spencer, Countess Spencer
- Patricia Smith, Viscountess Hambleden
- Henry Somerset, Duke of Beaufort
- Charles St Clair, Lord Sinclair
- Sir Michael Stevens
- William Tallon
- Anne Tennant, Baroness Glenconner
- Lady Juliet Townsend
- Charles Tryon, Baron Tryon
- Dame Annabel Whitehead
- Paul Whybrew
- Sir John Wilson
