= Paul Whybrew =

Page to Queen Elizabeth II (born 1959)

Paul Whybrew CVO RVM
- Born: 1959 (age 66–67); Witham, Essex, England

Paul Kevin Whybrew, CVO, RVM (born 1959) is a British former member of staff to the Royal Households of the United Kingdom. He served as Page of the Backstairs to Queen Elizabeth II until her death in 2022.

== Career ==
In 1982, Whybrew spoke to Michael Fagan, who had evaded security and broken into the royal bedroom at Buckingham Palace.

Whybrew took part in the Royal Procession at the Coronation of Charles III and Camilla as Serjeant-at-Arms.

== Honours ==
In addition to his honours, Whybrew was appointed Serjeant-at-Arms to the Queen in 2008. The role was established in the 12th century.

Whybrew was appointed a Member of the Royal Victorian Order (MVO) in the 2006 New Year Honours, promoted to Lieutenant of same Order (LVO) in the 2012 Diamond Jubilee Honours, and promoted again to Commander of the Order (CVO) in the 2023 Demise Honours. Besides this, he was awarded the Royal Victorian Medal (RVM) twice, first in Silver in the 1993 Birthday Honours and then in Gold in the 2016 Birthday Honours. He furthermore received the Queen Elizabeth II Version of the Royal Household Long and Faithful Service Medal for service to the Royal Family.

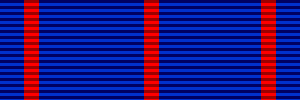

Ribbon	Description	Notes
	Royal Victorian Order (CVO)	Commander 2023 Demise Honours List; Previously appointed as a member (MVO); Previously appointed as a lieutenant (LVO)
	Royal Victorian Medal (RVM) Gold	2016 Queen's Birthday Honours List
	Royal Victorian Medal (RVM) Silver	1993 Queen's Birthday Honours List
	Queen Elizabeth II Silver Jubilee Medal	1977; UK version
	Queen Elizabeth II Golden Jubilee Medal	2002; UK version
	Queen Elizabeth II Diamond Jubilee Medal	2012; UK version
	Queen Elizabeth II Platinum Jubilee Medal	2022; UK version
	King Charles III Coronation Medal	2023; UK version
	Royal Household Long and Faithful Service Medal	Queen Elizabeth II version; 1998; With 2 clasps (40 years of service)

== Personal life ==
Whybrew, known as "Tall Paul", was born in Witham, Essex, in 1959 and is 192 cm (6 ft 4 in) tall. He attended Clacton County High School. He was also known as "Tall Paul" in contrast to another of the Queen's footmen, Paul Burrell, who was known as "Small Paul".

Whybrew appeared in the Buckingham Palace scenes of the short comedic film Happy and Glorious in the opening ceremony of the 2012 Summer Olympics, in which the Queen is seen jumping out of a helicopter with James Bond, played by Daniel Craig.
