= Dermot McMorrough Kavanagh =

Crown Equerry and British military officer (1890–1958)

Colonel Sir Dermot McMorrough Kavanagh, grandson of Arthur McMurrough Kavanagh, GCVO (9 January 1890 – 27 May 1958) was an Irish-born Crown Equerry of the Royal Household of the Sovereign of the United Kingdom from 1941 to 1955. He was educated at Eton College, and served in the 11th Hussars from 1909.

McMorrough Kavanagh was Assistant Military Secretary in Eastern Command from 1926 to 1930, and, on promotion to lieutenant-colonel, commanding officer of the 11th Hussars from 1932 to 1936. In 1939 he was promoted to colonel, and served in France in 1940.

He was appointed as Equerry in 1937 and was promoted to Crown Equerry in 1941, succeeding Sir Arthur Erskine. He was Crown Equerry until 1955, when he resigned and took the post of Extra Equerry until his death in London in 1958.

== Honours ==
- Appointed to the Royal Victorian Order as Commander (CVO) (1943 New Year Honours)
- Promoted to Knight Commander (KCVO) (1946 Birthday Honours)
- Promoted to Knight Grand Cross (GCVO) (1953 Coronation Honours)
- Named Irish feudal chief The McMorrough Kavanagh
