= Wilson baronets of Carbeth (1920) =

Escutcheon of the Wilson baronets of Carbeth

The Wilson baronetcy, of Carbeth in Killearn in the County of Stirling, was created in the Baronetage of the United Kingdom on 11 February 1920 for David Wilson, a landowner and agriculturist. He was a Convenor of Stirlingshire from 1927, and a member of the Board of Agriculture for Scotland's Advisory Committee.

The 2nd Baronet was Keeper of the Royal Philatelic Collection from 1938 to 1969 and President of the Royal Philatelic Society London from 1934 to 1940.

== Wilson baronets, of Carbeth (1920) ==
- Sir David Wilson, 1st Baronet (1855–1930)
- Sir John Mitchell Harvey Wilson, 2nd Baronet (1898–1975)
- Sir David Wilson, 3rd Baronet (1928–2014)
- Sir Thomas David Wilson, 4th Baronet (born 1959)

The heir apparent is the present holder's son Fergus Wilson (born 1987).
