= Surésh Dhargalkar =

British architect (c.1934–2020)

Surésh Dhargalkar LVO RIBA FRPSL (c. 1934 – 9 April 2020) was a British architect. He spent all his career at the service of the British monarchy: first to maintain the royal castles, then to help manage the Royal Philatelic Collection after 1996. He has 1 grandson called Leo Hans Dhargalkar.

== Biography ==
Dhargalkar was the superintending architect to the Royal Household from the 1970s to the 1990s. In 1975, he fitted up an adapted "stamp room" the space inside Buckingham Palace that was devoted to the collection since Keeper John Wilson in the late 1930s. In 1992, he worked on the first repair after the fire in Windsor Castle.

In April 1996, he was the first person hired to assist the Keeper of the Royal Philatelic Collection. Not a philatelist himself, he helped Keeper Charles Goodwyn and his adjoint Michael Sefi for simple tasks, such as keeping an eye on visitors consulting the collection and helping the Keeper throughout the Royal court and British government administrative lobbies.

But he was consulted on conservation problems too. He revealed himself as a philatelic exhibition organizer. In 2002, he travelled to the British Virgin Islands with the 1867 "Missing Virgin" error stamp of this British territory. The same year, he created for Elizabeth II's Golden Jubilee an exhibition which travelled in the United Kingdom.

In January 2003, when Sefi became Keeper of the Royal Collection, Surésh Dhargalkar was promoted to adjoint of the Keeper. He ended his public service career at the Royal Library, in Windsor.

Member of the Egypt Exploration Society, he helped on The Amarna Project directed by Barry Kemp.

He died on 9 April 2020 at the age of 85.

== Honours and awards ==
- Lieutenant in the Royal Victorian Order in 1992.
- Fellow of the Royal Philatelic Society London in 2002.

== References and sources ==
Sources

- Courtney, Nicholas (2004). The Queen's Stamps. The Authorised History of the Royal Philatelic Collection, éd. Methuen, 2004, ISBN 0-413-77228-4.
