= Malcolm Campbell Taylor =

Malcolm Campbell Taylor (1832–1922) was a minister of the Church of Scotland who served as private Chaplain to Queen Victoria in Scotland and through the Queen became Professor of Church History at the University of Edinburgh. In literature he is known as "Professor Campbell Taylor".

== Life ==
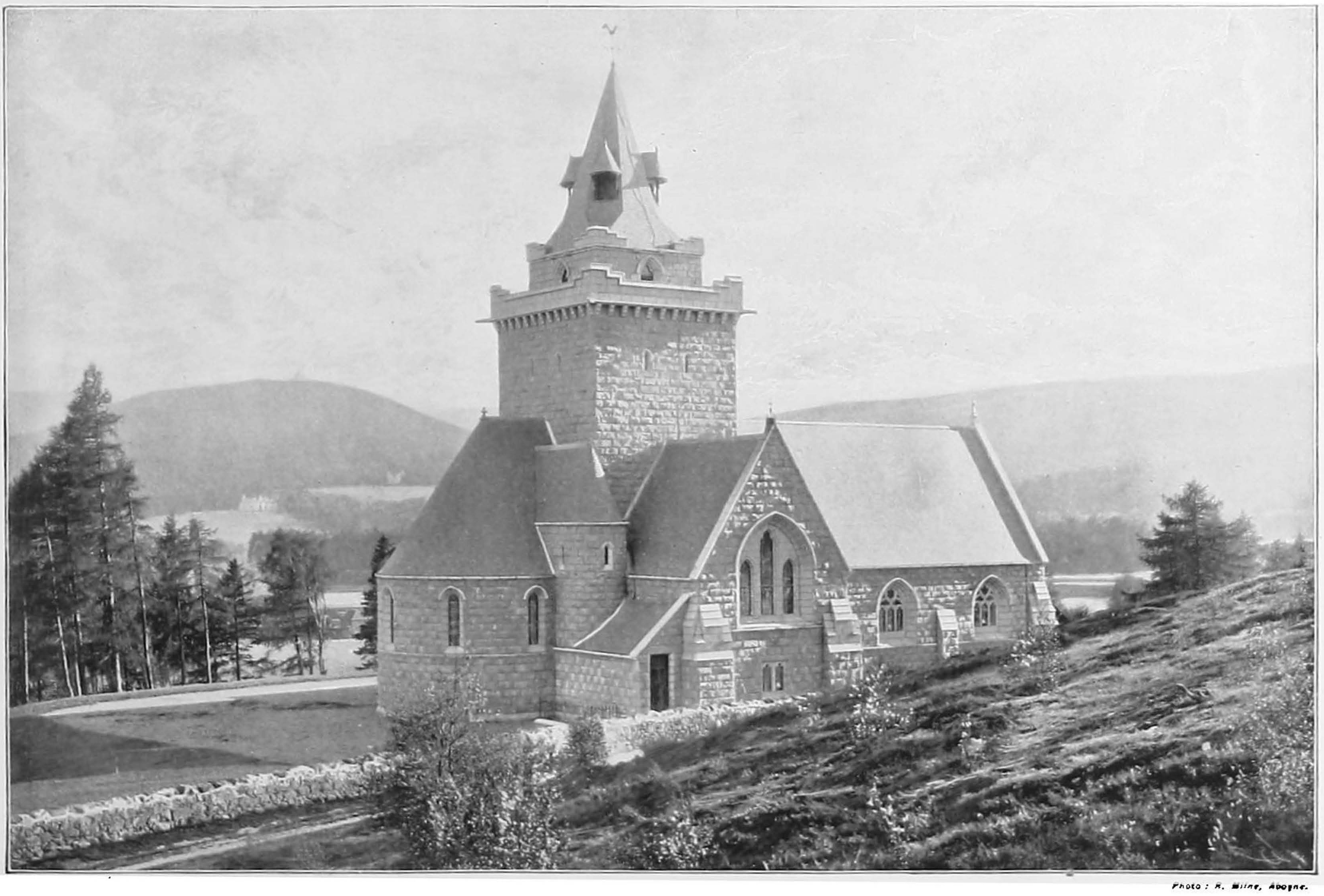
Crathie Kirk in 1895

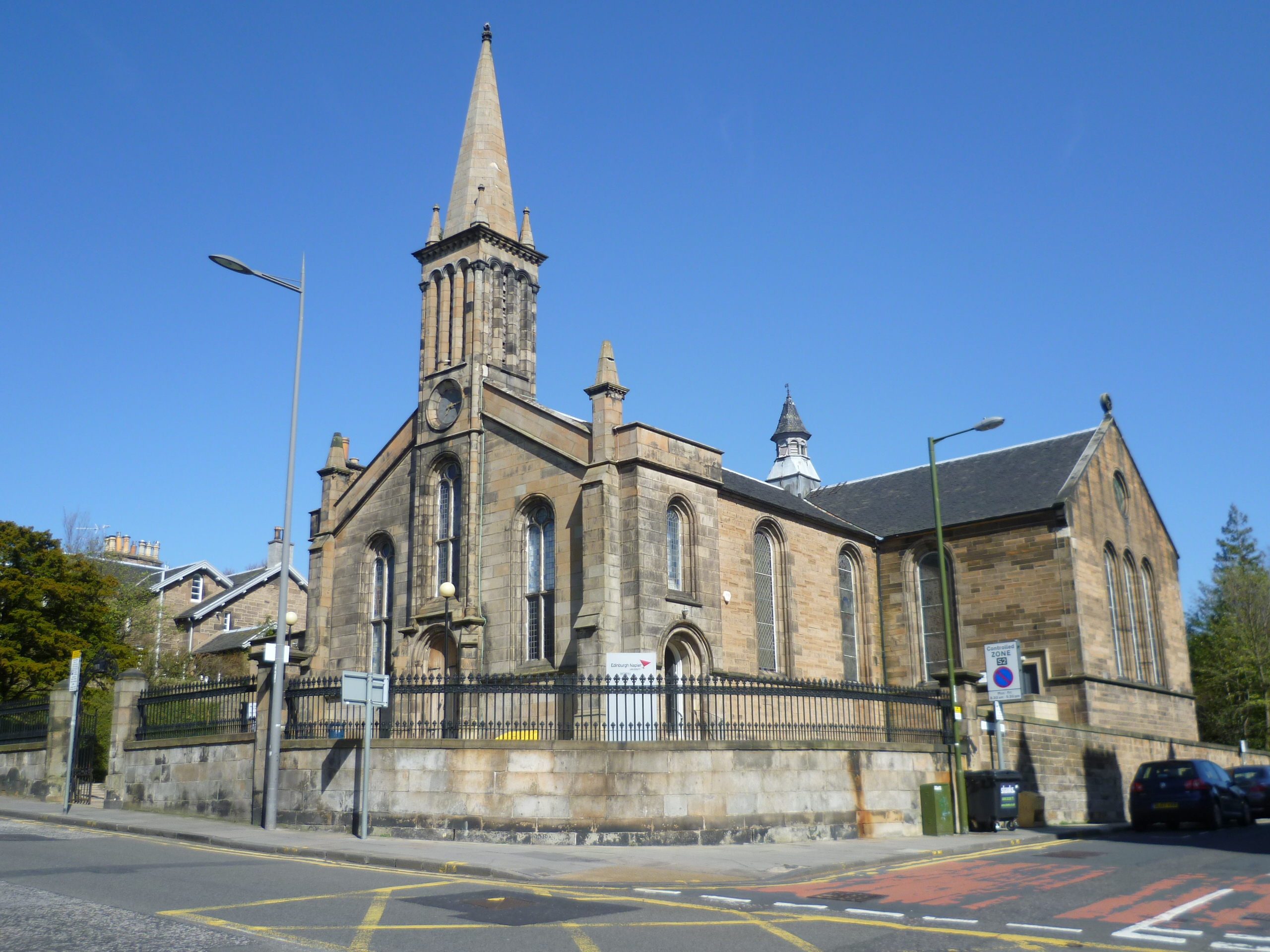
Morningside Parish Church, Edinburgh

He was born at Dalinlongard in Argyllshire in 1832 the son of John Taylor the parish schoolmaster of Kilarrow. He was educated at Bowmore parish school then went to a series of universities: Glasgow, St Andrews and in Germany attended courses at Heidelberg and Tubingen.

He was licensed to preach as a Church of Scotland minister in 1860 and ordained to Greyfriars Church in Dumfries in December 1862. In September 1865 he was translated to Montrose. He was awarded a Doctor of Divinity by his alma mater in 1866.

In June 1867 he made a critical move to Crathie parish church, which, due to its proximity to Balmoral Castle, was the parish church to Queen Victoria on her stays at Balmoral. Although now accepted without word (as Crathie continues to be the place of worship to the Queen in Scotland) the decision to worship here was highly controversial as the Queen was expected to worship at an Anglican or at least Episcopalian church when in Scotland. Her choice of worshipping in a Church of Scotland church was therefore thought of as a sign of dissent from the established Church of England. His congregation at this point included Queen Victoria's servant John Brown.

Taylor appears to have had quite a close personal relationship with the Queen. When he decided to move on in 1873, Queen Victoria appointed him as Extraordinary Chaplain to the Queen in Scotland, to retain a connection, when he translated to Morningside Parish Church in Edinburgh. In October 1877 Victoria presented him to the University of Edinburgh for the post of Professor of Church History, guaranteeing his acceptance.

In 1900 he was living at 6 Greenhill Park in the Morningside district of Edinburgh.

From 1892 to 1915 he was Secretary to the University Court. He resigned his post as Professor in August 1908. The University awarded him a doctorate LLD in 1909.

He died at home in Greenhill Park on 10 March 1922 aged 90.

== Family ==
In September 1865 he married Jessie Sproat (d. 1928) daughter of James Sproat of New Abbey. They had several children:

- James Sproat Taylor (a.k.a. "Cameron Taylor") (b. 1866) advocate and Major in 9th battalion Royal Scots
- Malcolm Campbell Taylor (b. 1868)
- Arthur Taylor, Major in the Scottish Rifles
- Jessie Taylor (b. 1869) married Rev Colin Campbell of St Mary's Church in Dundee
- Beatrice Mary Taylor (b. 1871)
- Anna Weir Taylor (b. 1873)

== Artistic recognition ==
He was sketched, mid-sermon, by William Brassey Hole in 1884 and this is held at the Scottish National Portrait Gallery.

He was portrayed in oils by George Fiddes Watt.

== Publications ==
- Last Century in Braemar
- Knox (1883)
