= Felix Wheeler =

Major Gerald Felix Wheeler was the Crown Equerry in the Royal Mews of the Royal Household of the Sovereign of the United Kingdom. He held this post from 2002 (replacing Lieutenant-Colonel Sir Seymour Gilbart-Denham), and retired in 2005.

The Crown Equerry is the operational head of the Royal Mews of the Royal Household of the Sovereign of the United Kingdom. He is responsible for the provision of land transport. The Equerries, although sharing their title with the Crown Equerry, perform distinct tasks, and are personal assistants to the Sovereign and senior members of the Royal Family.

Wheeler was commissioned into the Royal Scots Dragoon Guards from Sandhurst in 1981. He served in Kosovo in 2001 and retired in 2002.
