= Page of the Backstairs =

British royal household position

The Page of the Backstairs is a head position within the Royal Households of the United Kingdom and is part of several groups of pages overseeing the male staff. Originally "page of the backstairs" was used to describe a page of the bedchamber. During the reign of Queen Anne the page of the bedchamber was awarded by warrants of appointment. From 1760 the term describes a specific group of pages completely different to the pages of the bedchamber. After this period, six pages of the backstairs would be appointed by warrants of appointment as well.

Paul Whybrew served as Page of the Backstairs to Elizabeth II for several years until her death in 2022, while William Tallon held the position in the Household of Queen Elizabeth The Queen Mother.
