= Roy Petley =

British painter

- Born: 3 April 1950 (age 76); Grantham, Lincolnshire
- Known for: Painter
- Movement: Impressionism

Roy Petley (born 3 April 1950) is a British painter.

Petley paints en plein air to depict the wide expanse of English beaches and the gentle allure of Venetian landscapes. His works have been likened to those of John Constable, Edward Seago, and Campbell Mellon, British painters whose styles were influenced by the Barbizon school and Impressionism.

Beginning life in a children's home, he became one of the first artists to open an art gallery in Cork Street, a prestigious street lined with art galleries in London's Mayfair. His works are popularly collected by British royalty, including Queen Elizabeth The Queen Mother.

== Early life and background ==
The first-born son of a large family, Roy Petley was born on 3 April 1950 in Grantham, Lincolnshire. When he was five, Petley was abandoned to the Woodlands School near Uckfield, Sussex. The school also doubled as a home for abandoned children. He escaped his rough and often violent surroundings through art, teaching himself how to paint and draw.

At the age of sixteen, he received a scholarship to study art at Brighton University. But the pull of Italy and the country's old masters of art such as Leonardo da Vinci and Michelangelo proved too much. After a semester at Brighton University, he hitchhiked to Italy, settling in Florence where he eked out a living by drawing tourists who frequent the numerous cafes of the city, and studied the classics at the Uffizi Gallery and Palazzo Pitti. It was also in Florence that Petley had the chance to work with the collections of old master prints and drawings of the Gabinetto dei Disegni e Stampe of the Uffizi Gallery.

== Career ==
Petley was only seventeen when he returned to England in 1968. At first, he headed for Belfast, Northern Ireland where the Bell Gallery provided support and encouragement for the young artist. But after some time in Ireland, Petley returned to London and succeeded in exhibiting his paintings in the galleries of the city's high-end shops, such as Liberty's and Heal's. To support his art, he worked in the art department of the Greenwich Theatre.

By the age of 21, Petley left the theatre world altogether and began exhibiting his works on the railings of Green Park in London. In the 1970s, the perimeter of the park was home to mostly struggling local artists selling their works to the passing public. Exhibiting on Sundays, the Green Park railings were then respectably called "The Open Air Art Show". Though this tradition still continues, railings has since been occupied by individuals peddling tourist gifts and paintings made in China. He achieved minor success with American art dealers who took great interest in his work.

Following a chance encounter with the Duchess of Kent, a member of the late Queen Mother's household staff came to look at his works. Soon after William Tallon, the late Queen Mother's steward, returned to her with Petley's portrait study of Prince Charles, Petley was summoned to the Palace. Thus began the artist's long-standing friendship with the British Royals, which includes the Prince of Wales, the Duke of Edinburgh and the Duchess of Norfolk as his supporters. Exhibitions ensued in London and Dublin, and in places as far away as Dallas, Texas and the island of Barbados.

== Art ==
In every work of art, Petley incorporates a play of light and shadows. As he moves from his natural medium of oil to watercolour or pastel to sanguine, there remains a certain youthful light emanates from his paintings. A plein air painter, his works reflect his surroundings - from the quiet beaches of Norfolk and the picturesque parks of Paris, to his subtle nudes draped with sheets and sunlight. He captures the romanticism of days gone by, with nary a modern automobile or electrical appliance blemishing his canvas.

Renowned British art critic, Brian Sewell, described Petley as "a painter who still paints, who brushes watercolour onto paper and oil paint onto canvas, a painter who even settles down to draw the nude from life - an absurdly old-fashioned discipline for an artist to pursue."

== Petleys ==
Petleys is a fine art gallery based in London. It was first known as Petley Fine Art. In October 2003, with his son Jason and a business partner, Petley established the London gallery with the intent of providing opportunities and promoting the work of other artists. The gallery is in Cork Street, home of numerous art galleries of great repute, the Royal Academy of Arts, and based in the affluent Mayfair district of London. In the spring of 2004, a second gallery was opened in Monte Carlo and the gallery often participated in the Monte Carlo Fine Art & Antiques Fair. The gallery's line-up of artists include established portrait painters Neil Forster, whose sitters have included the Prince of Wales and Martin Yeoman, who is a member of the Royal Society of Portrait Painters; as well as international artists such as Vincente Romero from Spain and Yuri Krotov from Russia. In June 2009, Petley Fine Art was reformed into Petleys.

== List of exhibitions ==
- 1968: Drawings, Bell Gallery, Belfast
- 1970: Liberty's Gallery, London; Heal's Gallery, London
- 1972: The Open Air Art Show, Green Park, London
- 1973: Crome Gallery, Norfolk
- 1975: Liberty's Gallery, London
- 1976: Heal's Gallery, London; One-Man Exhibition, Crome Gallery, Norwich; The Small Gallery, Norwich
- 1977: Crome Gallery, Norwich
- 1978: Traveling Show, East Anglian Marine Artists, Cambridge; One-Man Exhibition, Century Gallery, Henley-on-Thames
- 1979: Traveling Show, East Anglian Marine Artists, Ipswich; Watercolours of Venice, Crome Gallery, Norwich; Century Gallery, Henley-on-Thames
- 1980: Traveling Show, East Anglian Marine Artists, Cambridge
- 1981: Century Gallery, Henley-on-Thames
- 1982: Australian Paintings, Century Gallery, Henley-on-Thames
- 1983: Century Gallery, Henley-on-Thames; Fermoy Gallery, King's Lynn
- 1984: Figures and Flowers, Century Gallery, Henley-on-Thames; Casa de Cultura, Estepona, Spain; Alpine Gallery, London
- 1985: Century Gallery, Henley-on-Thames; One-Man Exhibition, Don Carlos Hotel, Marbella, Spain; Alpine Gallery, London; The Open Air Arts Show, Green Park, London
- 1986: Galeria Arte, Benehavis, Spain; Paintings from the Mediterranean, Century Gallery, Henley-on-Thames
- 1987: Alpine Gallery, London; Century Gallery, Henley-on-Thames; Fine Art Trade Guild Gallery, London
- 1988: Fine Art Trade Guild Gallery, London; Century Gallery, Henley-on-Thames
- 1989: One-Man Exhibition, Oughertson Gallery, Barbados; Fine Art Trade Guild Gallery, London; One-Man Exhibition, Mistral Gallery, London
- 1990: One-Man Exhibition, Oughertson Gallery, Barbados
- 1991: One-Man Exhibition, Solomon Gallery, Dublin
- 1992: The Bruton St. Gallery, London
- 1993: Davis Messum, Cork St, London
- 1994: Davis Messum, Cork St, London (watercolours); David Messum, Cork St, London (oil paintings)
- 1995: Jorgensen Fine Art, Dublin; David Messum, Cork St, London
- 1996: The Victorian Gallery, Dallas, Texas
- 1997: The Victorian Gallery, Dallas, Texas; David Messum, Cork St, London; Jorgensen Fine Art, Dublin
- 1998: David Messum, Cork St, London; Sammer Gallery, Marbella, Spain
- 1999: David Messum, Cork St, London; The Victorian Gallery, Dallas, Texas
- 2000: David Messum, Cork St, London
- 2001: The Eakin Gallery, Belfast
- 2002: The Little Gallery, Saint Emilion, France
- 2003: Stables Gallery, County Antrim; Petley Fine Art, London
- 2004: Petley Fine Art, London & Monte Carlo; The Little Gallery, Saint Emilion
- 2005: Petley Fine Art, London & Monte Carlo
- 2006: Petley Fine Art, London & Monte Carlo
- 2007: Petley Fine Art, London & Monte Carlo; The Little Gallery, Saint Emilion
- 2008: Petley Fine Art, London & Monte Carlo
- 2009: Petleys
- 2010: Petleys

== Collections ==
- The Prince of Wales
- Queen Elizabeth The Queen Mother
- The Duchess of Norfolk
- Durban Museum
- The Lord Hanson
- Frederick Forsyth
- Mr & Mrs R. K. Black
- Mr & Mrs Snookes
- The Duke of Edinburgh
- The Duchess of Kent
- Ulster Museum
- Harvard University
- Susan George
- Timothy Dalton
- The Sultan of Brunei
- Dublin City Gallery The Hugh Lane
