= Sir David Wilson, 1st Baronet =

Scottish landowner and agriculturalist

Sir David Wilson Bt
- Born: 4 April 1855; Scotland
- Died: 8 March 1930 (aged 74)
- Occupations: Landowner, agriculturalist

Sir David Wilson, 1st Baronet (4 April 1855 – 8 March 1930) was a Scottish landowner and agriculturalist.

Wilson was educated at the University of Glasgow, graduating MA and DSc. He was a working farmer and served on many agricultural committees, as well as on Stirlingshire County Council. He was created a baronet in the 1920 New Year Honours for his services to Scottish agriculture.

== Footnotes ==
Baronetage of the United Kingdom
New creation	Baronet (of Carbeth); 1920–1930	Succeeded by John Wilson
