= John Marriott (philatelist) =

British teacher and philatelist

Sir John Brook Marriott KCVO (27 July 1922 in Stretford – 3 July 2001 in Godalming) was a British teacher and philatelist. He was the keeper of the Royal Philatelic Collection between 1969 and 1995.

== Early life ==
A mathematics graduate from St John's College, Cambridge during World War II, Marriott was quickly sent in 1943 to Bletchley Park, then the United Kingdom's main codebreaking establishment.

== Teaching ==
From 1945 to 1982 Marriott taught mathematics at Charterhouse School, in Godalming, Surrey, where he was a housemaster from 1960 to 1975.

== Philately ==
A Stamp collector from the age of twelve, Marriott was a specialist in Trinidad postal history. In 1952 he sold part of this collection to set up a new home after his marriage. He rebuilt his collection again and won medals at international philatelic exhibitions.

In 1969, John Wilson, keeper of the Royal Philatelic Collection, suggested Marriott as his successor. As a member since 1965 of the Royal Philatelic Society London's Expert Committee, of which Wilson was chairman, Marriott was very familiar with the Royal Collection. From 1969 to 1995, he divided his time between Charterhouse and London. His wife replaced him at the boarding house when he was at Buckingham Palace.

Because Wilson had preferred to let time pass between receiving new stamp issues from Britain and the Commonwealth and mounting them into albums, Marriott began to mount the issues of the Elizabeth II's reign into green leather covered albums, and continued the mounting of the King George VI blue collection. Apart from new issues sent by postal administrations, Marriott bought "errors, freaks, and oddities" : stamps with missing colours or inverted picture for example. Like his predecessor, Marriott travelled thirty-nine times with parts of the Collection to international exhibitions. He helped to organize the "London 1980" International Stamp Exhibition at Earl's Court, and the "London 1990" International Stamp Exhibition at Alexandra Palace.

He retired from teaching in 1982 and was elected to serve as president of the Royal Philatelic Society London (RPSL) from 1983 until 1986. He had been vice-president of the society since 1979.

Facing an increasing amount of work and activities, he was the first keeper of the Royal Collection to have a deputy: Charles Wyndham Goodwyn, president of the RPSL since 1991. He helped Marriott mount the collection, prepare exhibitions and write articles that permitted the Royal Philatelic Collection to be self-sufficient. Marriott gave up his function of the keeper to Goodwyn in September 1995.

== Honours and awards ==
- Member of the Royal Victorian Order in 1978, Commander in 1991 and Knight Commander in 1995.
- Tilleard Medal in 1968 from the RPSL for the exhibition of his Trinidad collection. This collection won a gold medal at the 1960 London and the 1967 Amsterdam exhibitions.
- Signatory of the Roll of Distinguished Philatelists in 1972.
- Alfred Lichtenstein Memorial Award in 1988 from the Collectors Club of New York.

== References and sources ==
Sources

- Courtney, Nicholas (2004). The Queen's Stamps. The Authorised History of the Royal Philatelic Collection. London: Methuen. ISBN 0-413-77228-4.
