= John Groves (British Army officer) =

British Crown Equerry

Major John Richard Groves (died 1859) was the first Crown Equerry in the Royal Household, appointed in 1854.

He died in office in 1859. Major Groves held the concurrent office of Superintendent of the Royal Mews.

Groves was educated at the Royal Military Academy, Woolwich and purchased a second lieutenancy in the Rifle Brigade in 1825. He was a first lieutenant by 1829, when he was appointed adjutant, and purchased a captaincy in 1832. In 1853, having left the Regular Army, he was commissioned major in the Essex Rifles.
