= William Tallon =

Member of the Royal Household (1935–2007)

William Tallon RVM
- Born: William John Stephenson Tallon; 12 November 1935; Birtley, County Durham, England
- Died: 23 November 2007 (aged 72); London, England
- Title: Steward and Page of the Backstairs

William John Stephenson Tallon (12 November 1935 – 23 November 2007), also known as Billy Tallon or Backstairs Billy, was a steward who worked for the British royal family, and was a member of the Queen Mother's staff at Clarence House in London.

== Early life ==
Tallon was born above his grandfather's hardware shop in Birtley, County Durham, in 1935. A year later, the family had fallen on hard times and moved to Coventry, where Tallon grew up in Norman Place Road in Coundon. He attended Barkers Butts Secondary Modern School. After he left school, he began training with a jeweller in Leamington Spa. The day he was to begin his apprenticeship, Tallon, then residing in Keresley, received a letter from the Comptroller of the Household, with a form to be completed and a travel warrant to Buckingham Palace. Having always shown an interest in the Royal Family, his book of press cuttings on King George VI and Queen Elizabeth was his greatest treasure. He enthusiastically followed the family's 1947 South African tour.

== Work with the Royal Family ==
Tallon's first job in the Royal Household was as a junior assistant at Easter Court at Windsor in 1951, aged 15. He had been writing letters asking for work with the Household for the previous five years. He was later employed at Buckingham Palace. He was set to join Queen Elizabeth II on her Commonwealth tour in 1953–1954, but was kept back, and did his National Service with the RAF. Subsequently, he asked Queen Elizabeth the Queen Mother whether he could join the staff at her home, Clarence House. She agreed, and he remained with her until her death.

In 1978, Tallon succeeded Walter Taylor as Steward and Page of the Backstairs. He would thus earn the tabloid nickname "Backstairs Billy". Tallon was on duty from early in the morning until the Queen Mother went to bed; he entered her private rooms without knocking, and bought the Christmas presents which she gave to others.

Tallon's partner of more than 30 years was Reginald Wilcock, who had become a footman at Buckingham Palace in 1954. Wilcock was a valet to the Duke of Windsor in Paris from 1957 to 1959, before joining the Queen Mother's staff at Clarence House in 1960 as a footman. He had been the House Deputy Steward and the Queen Mother's Page of the Presence since 1978. On 4 August 2000, Wilcock served the Queen Mother her 100th birthday morning tea in her room. That night, while at the Royal Opera House in Covent Garden with the Queen Mother, Tallon learnt that Wilcock was dying. A week later, on 11 August, Wilcock died, aged 66. Tallon arranged a funeral for him at the Queen's Chapel in Marlborough House.

After Wilcock's death, Tallon reportedly suffered from depression, and felt "sidelined" when the Queen Mother turned to a younger team of staff for her nursing care. However, when she died in 2002, at the age of 101, Tallon was said to be heartbroken. Following this, Tallon left Clarence House, where he had lived in the Lodge house. He settled in a ground-floor flat with a garden in Kennington, south east London. On 23 November 2007, he was found dead in his flat, aged 72, as a result of liver failure.

Tallon's funeral took place at the Queen's Chapel in St James's Palace, with readings from Derek Jacobi and Patricia Routledge. The funeral was attended by more than 200 people, including the Earl of Snowdon, Lady Sarah Chatto, June Brown, Paul O'Grady, Phyllida Law, Roy Strong, Roy Petley and Keith Barron.

In 2008, Reeman Dansie Auctioneers sold Tallon's collections of royal memorabilia, including personal letters, gifts, photographs and programmes, even though he had said in the past that he intended to leave them to The Royal Collection, as noted in the book Little Billy Tallon, a memoir by Ty Munroe, who was his under butler at Clarence House. There was much interest in the sale, which realised £440,000. Tallon always turned down offers from the press and media to be interviewed about his job, and did not publish a memoir. He never worked anywhere else, and received his fifty years of service medal, which was also sold.

In 2014, Buckingham Palace dismissed suggestions, made in The Royal Life of William Tallon, a biography of Tallon written by Tom Quinn, that the Queen Mother was drunk and "dotty" for much of her last two decades. Margaret Rhodes, the Queen Mother's niece, who had served as one of her ladies-in-waiting, denied the claim, saying that the Queen Mother rarely drank gin and tonic, preferring a "gin martini mix, which she usually made herself".

== In popular culture ==
A Channel 4 documentary about Tallon's life and career, Backstairs Billy: The Queen Mum's Butler, was broadcast in 2009.

Tallon was played by Ian Stark in Tea with the Old Queen by Graham Woolnough. The one-man show was based around the fictionalised diaries of Tallon, and first ran at the Edinburgh Festival Fringe in 2012. It has also been performed at the Jermyn Street Theatre in London.

In July 2023, it was announced that Tallon would be portrayed by Luke Evans in a new play, Backstairs Billy, with Penelope Wilton as the Queen Mother. Written by Marcelo Dos Santos, the production was set in 1979 and explored the relationship between Tallon and his royal employer. Directed by Michael Grandage, it ran at the Duke of York's Theatre from October 2023 until January 2024.

== Awards ==
Tallon was awarded the Royal Victorian Medal in Silver in the 1975 New Year Honours, and received a Bar in the 1996 New Year Honours. He was one of the few holders of the medal in Gold, the highest award in the lowest grade of the Royal Victorian Order; he was awarded this in the 2001 Birthday Honours, having received his 50-year Service Clasp earlier that year.

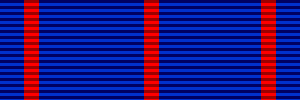

| Ribbon | Description | Notes |
| | Royal Victorian Medal (RVM) Gold | 2001 Queen's Birthday Honours List |
| | Royal Victorian Medal (RVM) Silver | 1975 New Year Honours, Bar in 1996 New Year Honours |
| | Queen Elizabeth II Coronation Medal | 1953 |
| | Queen Elizabeth II Silver Jubilee Medal | 1977; UK version |
| | Queen Elizabeth II Golden Jubilee Medal | 2002; UK version |
| | Royal Household Long and Faithful Service Medal | Queen Elizabeth II Version; 1971; With 3 Clasps (50 years of service) |
