= Crown Equerry =

Position in the British Royal Household

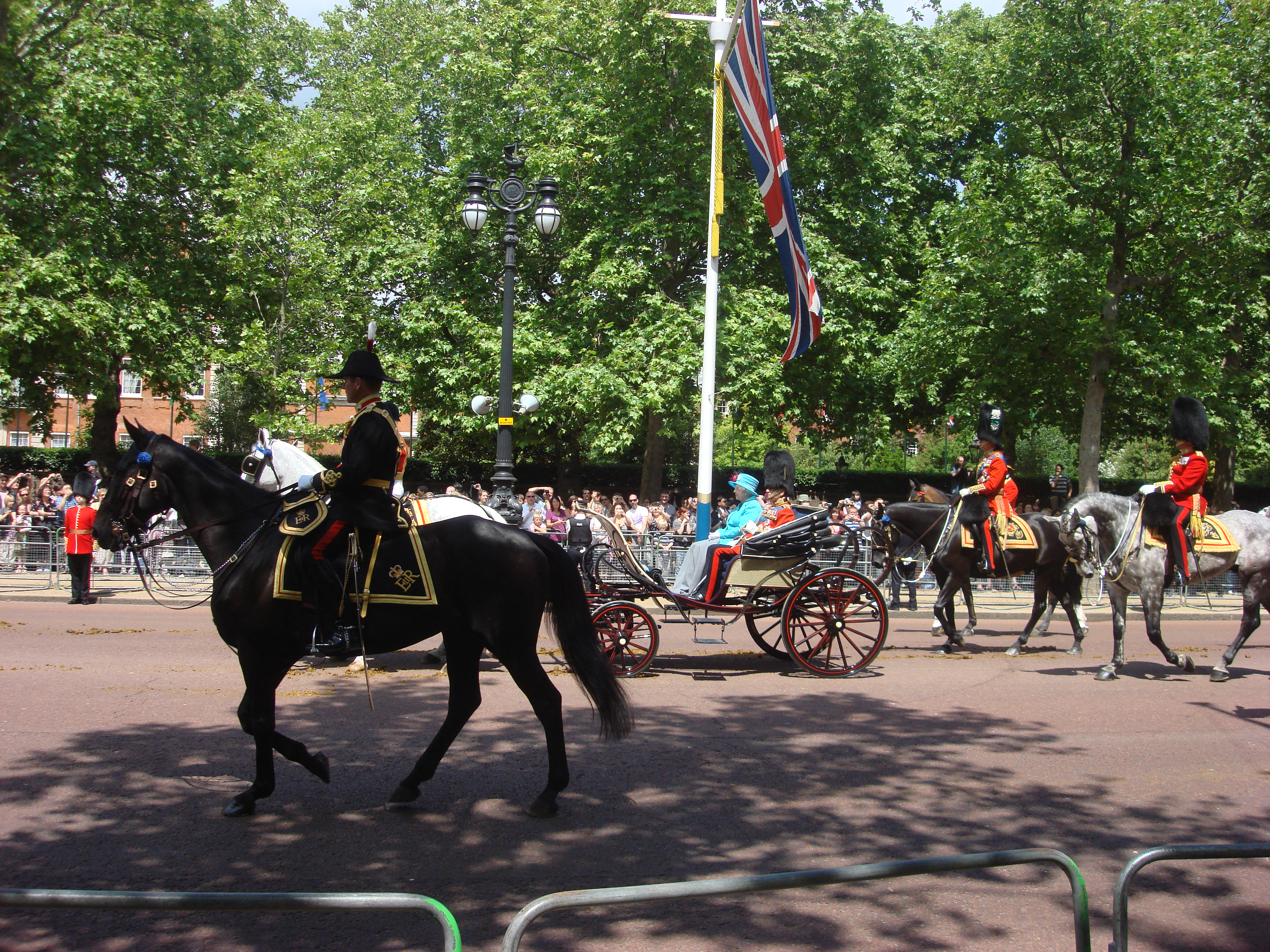
The Crown Equerry (left, on horseback, in 2009) customarily escorts the monarch when carriages are used in procession.

The Crown Equerry is the operational head of the Royal Mews of the Royal Household of the Sovereign of the United Kingdom. As executive head of the Royal Mews Department, they are responsible for the provision of vehicular transport for the sovereign, both cars and horse-drawn carriages. Rail travel is arranged by the Royal Travel Office, which also co-ordinates air transport.

The position of Crown Equerry should not be confused with that of Equerry: although both are nominally under the Master of the Horse, the equerries have a distinct role as personal assistants to the sovereign and senior members of the royal family.

== History ==
After 1827, the Master of the Horse became a political office, its holder changing with each change of government. To provide continuity in the management of the Royal Mews, the role of Crown Equerry was created in 1854. The first incumbent was John Groves, a retired Major of the Essex Rifles; his full title was Crown Equerry, Secretary to the Master of the Horse and Superintendent of the Royal Stables. The secretarial aspect of the job led to him being seen as inferior to the other Equerries, and he was kept at one remove from the Queen and the Palace (Charles Phipps, the Keeper of the Privy Purse, was at pains to make clear in a letter to the Master of the Horse that the new office pertained 'exclusively to the Stables department').

Groves died in office five years later; his successor, Colonel George Ashley Maude, remained in post for thirty-five years. During this time he consolidated the office and worked to improve the working conditions of the Mews staff. The Queen (who esteemed him 'a kind good man') granted him direct access to her person, and it became established practice that the Crown Equerry would receive and convey the monarch's instructions directly with regard to all aspects of the Royal Mews and its operations.

The job of Superintendent of the Royal Mews was established as a separate office in 1859; the Superintendent served as assistant to the Crown Equerry until 2000 when the post was abolished. In the 21st century the Crown Equerry works closely with the Lord Chamberlain's Office, which oversees arrangements for ceremonial occasions and briefs the Crown Equerry accordingly.

In December 2025 Colonel Erica Bridge became the first woman appointed to the post, having previously served as commanding officer of the King's Troop, Royal Horse Artillery.

== List of Crown Equerries ==
- Major John Groves 1854–1859
- Lieutenant Colonel Sir George Ashley Maude 1859–1894
- Major General Sir Henry Ewart, 1st Baronet 1894–1910
- Captain Sir Charles Wentworth-FitzWilliam 1910–1924
- Colonel Sir Arthur Erskine, 1924–1941
- Colonel Sir Dermot McMorrough Kavanagh 1941–1955
- Brigadier Walter Sale 1955–1961
- Lieutenant Colonel Sir John Mansel Miller 1961–1987
- Lieutenant Colonel Charles Stephens 1987
- Lieutenant Colonel Sir Seymour Gilbart-Denham 1987–2002
- Major Felix Wheeler 2002–2005
- Major Simon Robinson 2005–2010
- Colonel Sir Toby Browne 2010–2025
- Colonel Erica Bridge 2025–

== See also ==
- Gentleman of the Horse for a preceding post
- Master of the Horse for the titular head of the Mews (and equivalents in other countries)
