= Gillie =

Outdoor attendant, especially one assisting with hunting or fishing

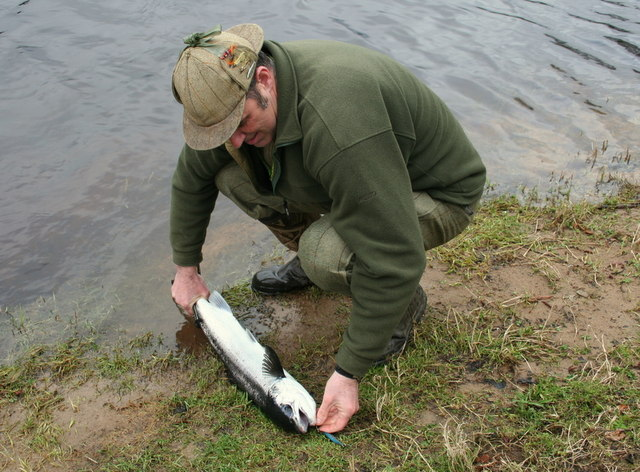
The Kinermoney Ghillie dealing with a kelt

Gillie or ghillie is an ancient Gaelic term for a person who acts as a servant or attendant on a fishing, hunting, deer stalking or hawking expedition, primarily in the Scottish Highlands or on a river such as the River Spey. In origin it referred especially to someone who attended on behalf of his male employer or guests.

This position still exists in some Highland locations as of 2021, such as the Isle of Skye, according to the BBC. They are no longer manservants or attendants and do not carry chiefs across rivers as in the distant past; today, they "manage the wilderness and guide travellers through it".

== Etymology ==
The origin of this word dates from the late 16th century, from the Scottish Gaelic gille, "lad, servant", cognate with the Irish giolla.

Historically, the term was used for a Highland chief's attendant.

A ghillie-weetfit, a term now obsolete (a translation of "gille-caisfliuch", from the Gaelic cos 'foot' or 'leg', and fliuch 'wet'), was the ghillie whose duty was to carry his master over streams. It became a term of contempt among the Lowlanders for the "tail" (as his attendants were called) of a Highland chief.

== Changing role ==
The BBC provided this history of the role in the late 16th century. "Highland chiefs needed attendants and manservants to do the toil, slog and heavy lifting ... they were responsible for knowing the weather conditions for stalking, where the best fishing spots were". One of their duties was to carry chiefs across rivers so they would not get wet.

Ghillies remained important in the 19th century although private landlords (not clans) had become owners of much of the land. They "would travel north to estates ... and soon, the Highlands became a holiday hotspot for horse riding, shooting deer and grouse and casting for salmon. Always, ghillies were constant and knowledgeable presences".

One well-known example was John Brown, who worked for Albert, Prince Consort at Balmoral in the 19th century. One source defines his role as "shooting guide and gun-loader". By 1851, Brown was given a "permanent role" as the leader of the Queen's pony, "on Prince Albert's instigation". After Prince Albert's death, he joined Queen Victoria's group of personal attendants and became a confidant of the monarch for some 20 years.

In the Highlands, ghillies were, and are, respected. "While ghillie visibility may have been lost in some cases, they still play a key role in many parts of rural life ... [they are also] outdoor educators", according to Donald Fraser, head of wildlife management with NatureScot. One of their tasks is the management of deer population. Some still wear the traditional ghillie outfit. One current example includes "a three-piece estate tweed outfit from neck to grubby boots ... thick wool waistcoat, jacket and breeches ... forest-green tie and coarse-wool checked shirt, with pinned leaping salmon and stag head brooches, a spruce-green fishing hat and mud-flecked gaiters".

The BBC interviewed another ghillie who works on an estate not far from Balmoral, "a life-long fishing ghillie and deer stalker" who much like a "land manager and sustainability officer" and who has gained tasks such as "countryside maintenance, legal species control, sustainable harvest of wild meat, eco-tourism ..."

Businesses that operate salmon fishing tours on rivers and streams surrounded by private land employ "beat" ghillies who provide advice on maximising the odds of catching salmon. The Gordon Castle Estate, for example, states that all of their River Spey "fishing beats have an experienced ghillie who is able to give advice, support and instruction where needed". Professional salmon fishing guide Jock Monteith states that "these salmon river career jobs tend not to be the highest paid in society" and recommends giving the ghillies gratuities. Salmon Fishing Holidays Scotland explains that a beat ghillie is not the same as a private fishing guide; the ghillie assists an entire group, and not only a single fisher.

== Folklore ==
In Irish and Celtic folk tales, a character with the name Gilla or Gille appears in several tales. The name refers to a lad or youth of low social status, usually dressed in goatskins or in the hide of another animal. The name also appears as an Irish name.

== See also ==
- Ghillie Dhu, a Scottish mythological figure whose name means Dark Servant
- Ghillie suit
- Harald Gille
- John Brown
