= Crathie Kirk =

Church in Scotland

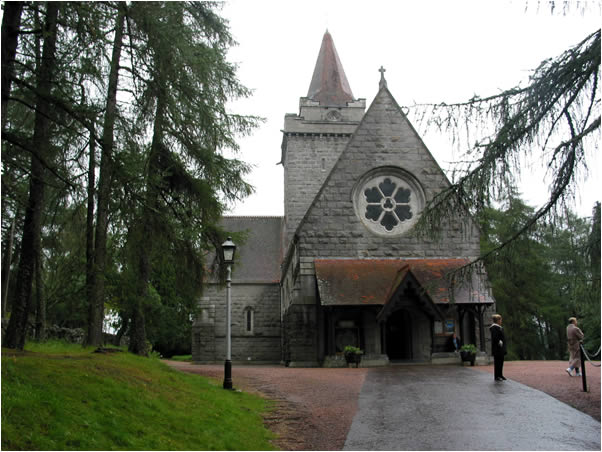
- Crathie Kirk

- Location of Crathie Kirk in Aberdeenshire
- 57°02′23″N 3°12′44″W
- Denomination: Church of Scotland
- Churchmanship: Reformed
- Website: braemarandcrathieparish.org.uk

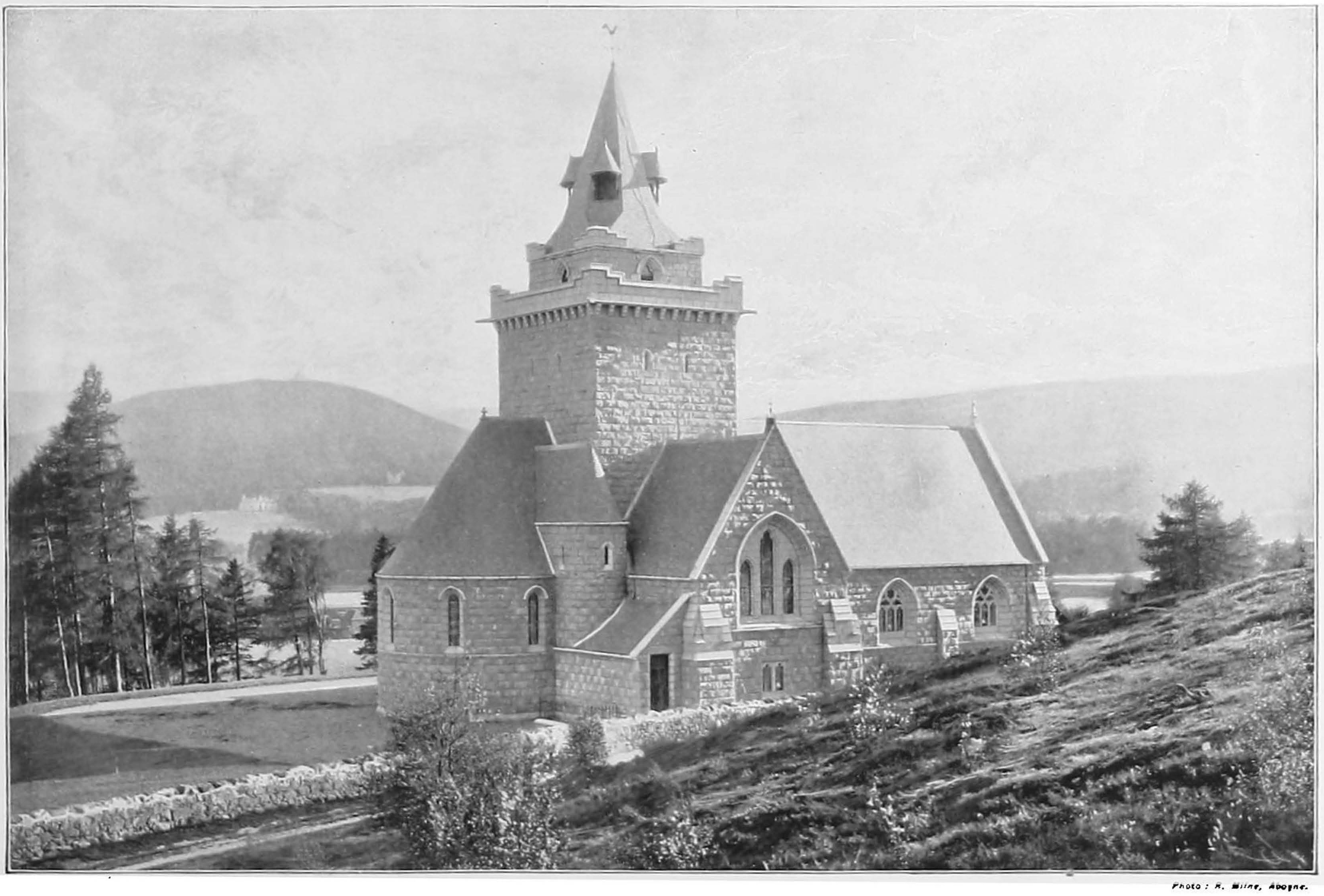
The kirk in 1895

Crathie Kirk is a small Church of Scotland parish church in the Scottish village of Crathie, best known for being the regular place of worship of the British royal family when they are in residence at the nearby Balmoral Castle.

Crathie Kirk is now united with neighbouring Braemar to form a single parish with two places of worship. Eventually this parish will be further enlarged to include Glenmuick (Ballater). The minister (since 2005) is Kenneth Mackenzie. Mackenzie was previously minister of the Church of Scotland congregation in Budapest, Hungary (1999–2005).

== History ==
Crathie has been a place of Christian worship since the 9th century when a church was founded on the banks of the River Dee by Saint Manire (Bishop of Aberdeenshire and Banff and a follower of Saint Columba, the pioneer of Christianity in Scotland). It is traditionally held that Manire baptised Pictish converts in a pool of the Dee east of the modern village of Crathie. A single standing stone at Rinabaich is all that remains of Manire's church (where Manire himself is reputedly buried). Subsequent places of worship were situated further west, near the location of present-day Crathie village. The ruins of a 13th-century church, dedicated to Saint Manire, stand on the riverbank south of the current structure.

A later church was built at the current site in 1805. Queen Victoria worshipped there from 1848, and every British monarch since has worshipped at Crathie Kirk. Victoria laid the foundation stone for a new, much larger, church in 1893. Victoria's decision to worship at Crathie Kirk initially caused a scandal, particularly when it was discovered that she had received communion there. As Supreme Governor of the Anglican Church of England, it was expected that she would worship in the Scottish Episcopal Church, which recognised the authority of the archbishop of Canterbury, although to do so would have been illegal since in her own words "Scotch bishops are mere dissenters".

Anne, Princess Royal, married Timothy Laurence, then a commander in the Royal Navy, at Crathie Kirk, on 12 December 1992. The couple chose to marry in Scotland as the Church of England did not, at the time, permit remarriage after divorce. The Church of Scotland, which does not consider marriage to be a sacrament, has no objection to remarriage after divorce, depending on the circumstances which led to the end of the previous marriage. The British royal family attended the Sunday service here after the death of Diana, Princess of Wales, on the morning of 31 August 1997.

== Architecture ==
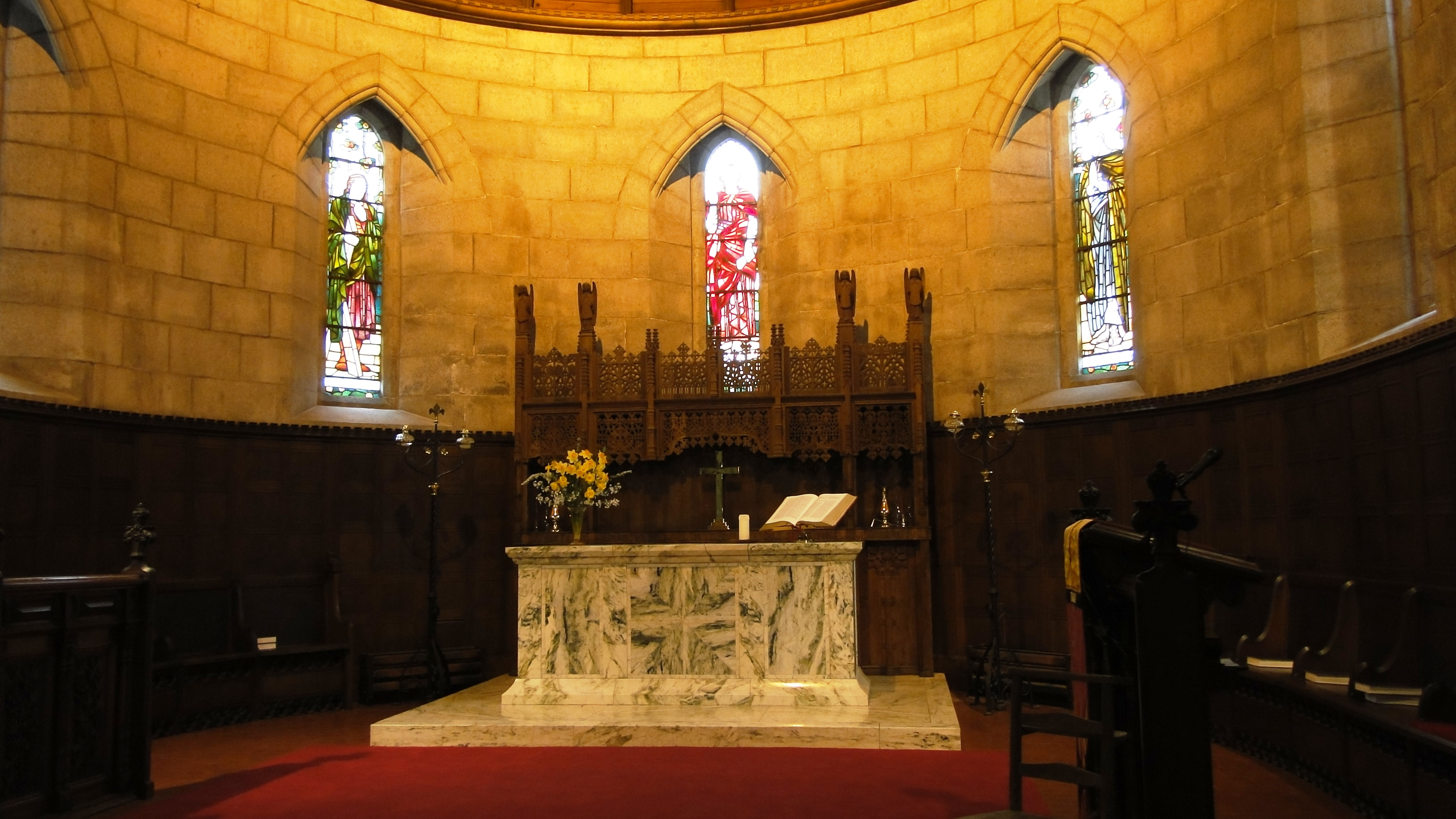
Interior

The walls are built of local granite and the roof made of Scots pine. Building materials were donated by the surrounding estates, and £5000 raised from the local population to fund construction. A gift of £2,000 was made by Queen Victoria's daughters Princess Beatrice and Princess Louise who raised the money at a Bazaar held in the grounds of Balmoral Castle.

The church, built in the fashionable Gothic Revival style by Elgin architect A. Marshall Mackenzie, was completed in 1895. Marshall Mackenzie then went on to build St Ninian's Chapel, Braemar, for Queen Victoria's grandson-in-law, the 1st Duke of Fife. Crathie Kirk's south transept is reserved for royal use. The north transept contains pews belonging to the Farquharson family, Lairds of Invercauld and owners of Braemar Castle and to the Gordon family, Lairds of Abergeldie and owners of nearby Abergeldie Castle.

== Royal connections ==
- Queen Victoria donated two stained glass windows which commemorate author and social reformer Reverend Norman MacLeod, and endowed the Father Willis organ that stood in the kirk between 1895 and 2003.
- Victoria's devoted servant John Brown is buried in the churchyard.
- Princess Beatrice, the youngest daughter of Queen Victoria, donated four bells which continue to hang in the belltower.
- Edward VII donated two marble medallions commemorating his brother Alfred, Duke of Saxe-Coburg and Gotha, and sister Victoria, Princess Royal and German Empress.
- Edward's son George V donated a communion table dedicated to the memory of his father. This was made from white marble quarried on the island of Iona, the site of Columba's monastery.
- Elizabeth II donated a Bible decorated with the royal coat of arms.
- Following the death of Elizabeth II at Balmoral, the church held a private service for members of the royal family on 10 September 2022.

== Ministers ==
- 1563 – Sir Laurence Coutts
- 1567 – Richard Christison
- 1574 – John Wilson
- 1576–85 – Archibald Wilson
- 1590–1608 – David Sanderson
- 1626–63 – Alexander Ferries (Ferguson) M.A.
- 1669–99 – William Robertson M.A.
- 1700–14 – Adam Ferguson M.A.
- 1715–48 – John McInnes M.A.
- 1784–88 – James Wilson M.A.
- 1789–1822 – Charles McHardy M.A.
- 1822–40 - Alexander McFarlane
- 1840–63 – Archibald Anderson M.A.
- 1864–74 – Alexander Minty Beattie M.A.
- 1867–73 – Malcolm Campbell Taylor M.A.
- 1874–96 – Archibald Alexander Campbell D.D.
- 1897–1918 – Samuel James Ramsay Sibbald M.V.O., D.D
- 1919–41 – John Stirton C.V.O., D.D.
- 1937–63 – John Lamb C.V.O., D.D.
- 1964–71 – Ronald Henderson Gunn Budge M.V.O., M.A.
- 1972–77 – Thomas James Trail Nichol M.V.O., M.B.E., M.C., M.A., D.D.
- 1979–96 – James Alexander Keith Angus T.D., M.A., L.V.O.
- 1996–2005 – Robert P. Sloan M.A., B.D.
- Since 2005 – Kenneth I. Mackenzie B.D., C.P.S.

== Burials of note ==
- John Brown

== See also ==
- List of Church of Scotland parishes
