= John Brown (servant) =

Scottish servant and favourite of Queen Victoria

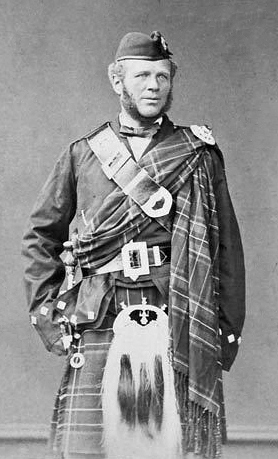
- Brown, c. 1860s
- Born: 8 December 1826; Crathie, Aberdeenshire, Scotland
- Died: 27 March 1883 (aged 56); Windsor Castle, England
- Resting place: Crathie Kirk, Aberdeenshire, Scotland
- Occupations: Gillie, personal attendant
- Employer: Queen Victoria

John Brown (8 December 1826 – 27 March 1883) was a Scottish personal attendant and favourite of Queen Victoria for many years after working as a gillie for Prince Albert. He was appreciated by many (including the Queen) for his competence and companionship, and resented by others (most notably her son and heir apparent, the future Edward VII, the rest of the Queen's children, ministers, and the palace staff) for his influence and informal manner. The exact nature of his relationship with Victoria has remained the subject of great speculation by contemporaries and historians today.

== Early life ==
John Brown was born on 8 December 1826 at Crathienaird, Crathie and Braemar Aberdeenshire, to Margaret Leys and John Brown, and went to work as an outdoor servant (in Scots gillie or ghillie) at Balmoral Castle, which Queen Victoria and Prince Albert leased in February 1848, and purchased outright in November 1851.

Brown had several younger brothers and a sister, three of whom also entered the royal service. His brother Archibald Anderson "Archie" Brown, 15 years John's junior, eventually became personal valet to Victoria's youngest son, Prince Leopold, Duke of Albany.

== Relationship with Queen Victoria ==
By 1851, Brown's role changed from being gillie and personal friend to Prince Albert to a "permanent role" as the leader of the Queen's pony, "on Prince Albert's instigation".

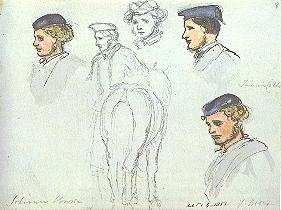
A young John Brown as sketched by Queen Victoria

Prince Albert's untimely death in 1861 was a shock from which Queen Victoria never fully recovered. Brown became a friend and supported the Queen. Victoria was known to give him many gifts as well as creating two medals for him, the Faithful Servant Medal and the Devoted Service Medal. She also commissioned a portrait of him in 1876, given to him on Albert's birthday, 26 August.

Victoria's children and ministers were not as accepting of the high regard she had for Brown, and rumours circulated that there was something improper in their relationship. Victoria herself dismissed the chatter as "ill-natured gossip in the higher classes".

The diaries of Lewis Harcourt contain a report that one of the Queen's chaplains, Rev. Norman Macleod, made a deathbed confession repenting his action in presiding over Queen Victoria's marriage to John Brown. Debate continues over this report. Harcourt did not receive the confession directly (he was nine when Macleod died) but rather, it is claimed to have passed from Macleod's sister to the wife of Henry Ponsonby, the Queen's private secretary, and thence to Harcourt's father Sir William Harcourt, then Home Secretary. Harcourt served as Home Secretary in the final three years of Brown's life.

A letter from Victoria to Viscount Cranbrook, written shortly after Brown's death but rediscovered in 2004, shows how she described the loss:

Perhaps never in history was there so strong and true an attachment, so warm and loving a friendship between the sovereign and servant [...] Strength of character as well as power of frame – the most fearless uprightness, kindness, sense of justice, honesty, independence and unselfishness combined with a tender, warm heart [...] made him one of the most remarkable men. The Queen feels that life for the second time is become most trying and sad to bear deprived of all she so needs [...] the blow has fallen too heavily not to be very heavily felt...

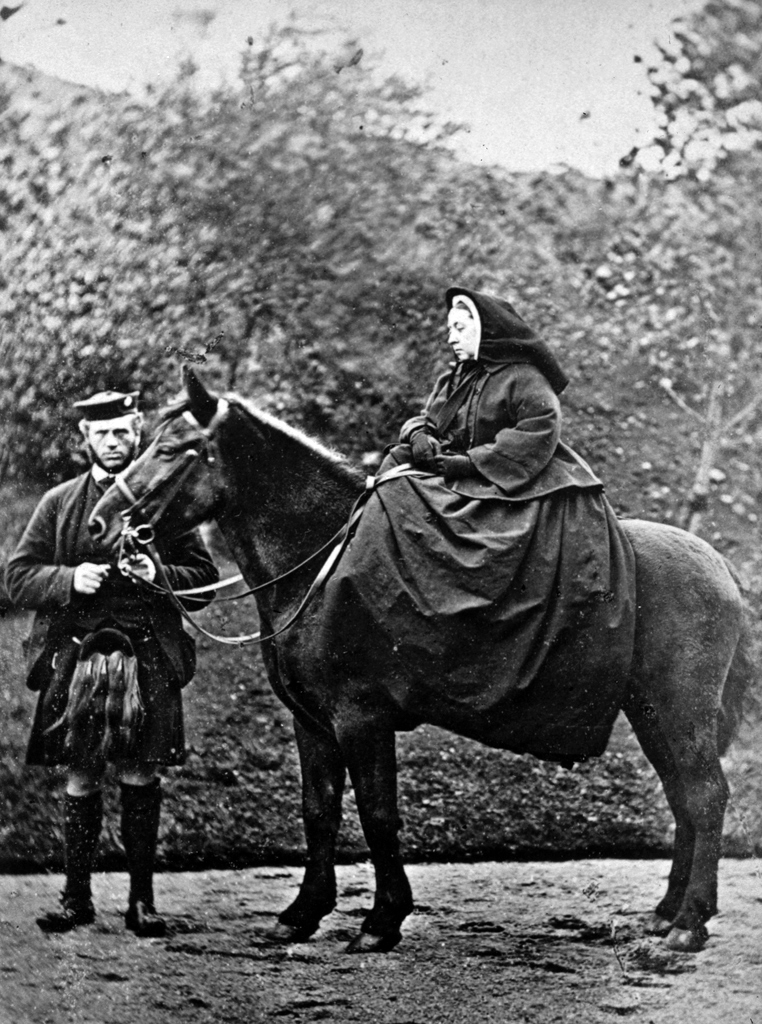
Queen Victoria with John Brown at Balmoral

The phrase "for the second time" relates to the death of Brown after the death of her husband Prince Albert. The historian who discovered the letter believed that it suggested that Victoria, in her mind, equated Brown's death with Albert's, and that she therefore viewed him as more than a servant, but also as a good friend and confidant. There is, however, no evidence that Brown and Victoria were lovers.

Those who believe that the Queen saw Brown as little more than a servant point to the fact that after his death she became similarly attached to an Indian servant, Mohammed Abdul Karim, one of two who had come to work for her in late June 1887. He came to be resented even more than John Brown. Unlike Brown, whose loyalty was not questioned, there were contemporary allegations that Abdul Karim exploited his position for personal gain and prestige.

Brown pre-deceased the Queen, in 1883, at the age of 56. Tony Rennell's book Last Days of Glory: The Death of Queen Victoria describes Victoria's detailed instructions about her burial to her doctor, Sir James Reid. These included a list of the keepsakes and mementoes, photographs and trinkets to be placed in the coffin with her: along with Albert's dressing gown and a plaster cast of his hand, the Queen was buried with a lock of Brown's hair, his photograph, Brown's mother's wedding ring, given to her by Brown, along with several of his letters. The photograph, wrapped in white tissue paper, was placed in her left hand, with flowers arranged to hide it from view. She wore the ring on the third finger of her right hand.

== Death ==
Two days after being afflicted with erysipelas, Brown died at Windsor Castle on 27 March 1883, aged 56. He was buried in Crathie Kirkyard, in the adjacent plot to his parents and several siblings. The inscription on his gravestone reflects the depth of his relationship with the Queen:

This stone is erected in affectionate and grateful remembrance of John Brown the devoted and faithful personal attendant and beloved friend of Queen Victoria in whose service he had been for 34 years.

Born at Crathienaird 8th Decr. 1826 died at Windsor Castle 27th March 1883.

That Friend on whose fidelity you count/that Friend given to you by circumstances/over which you have no control/was God's own gift.

Well done good and faithful servant/Thou hast been faithful over a few things,/I will make thee ruler over many things/Enter thou into the joy of the Lord.

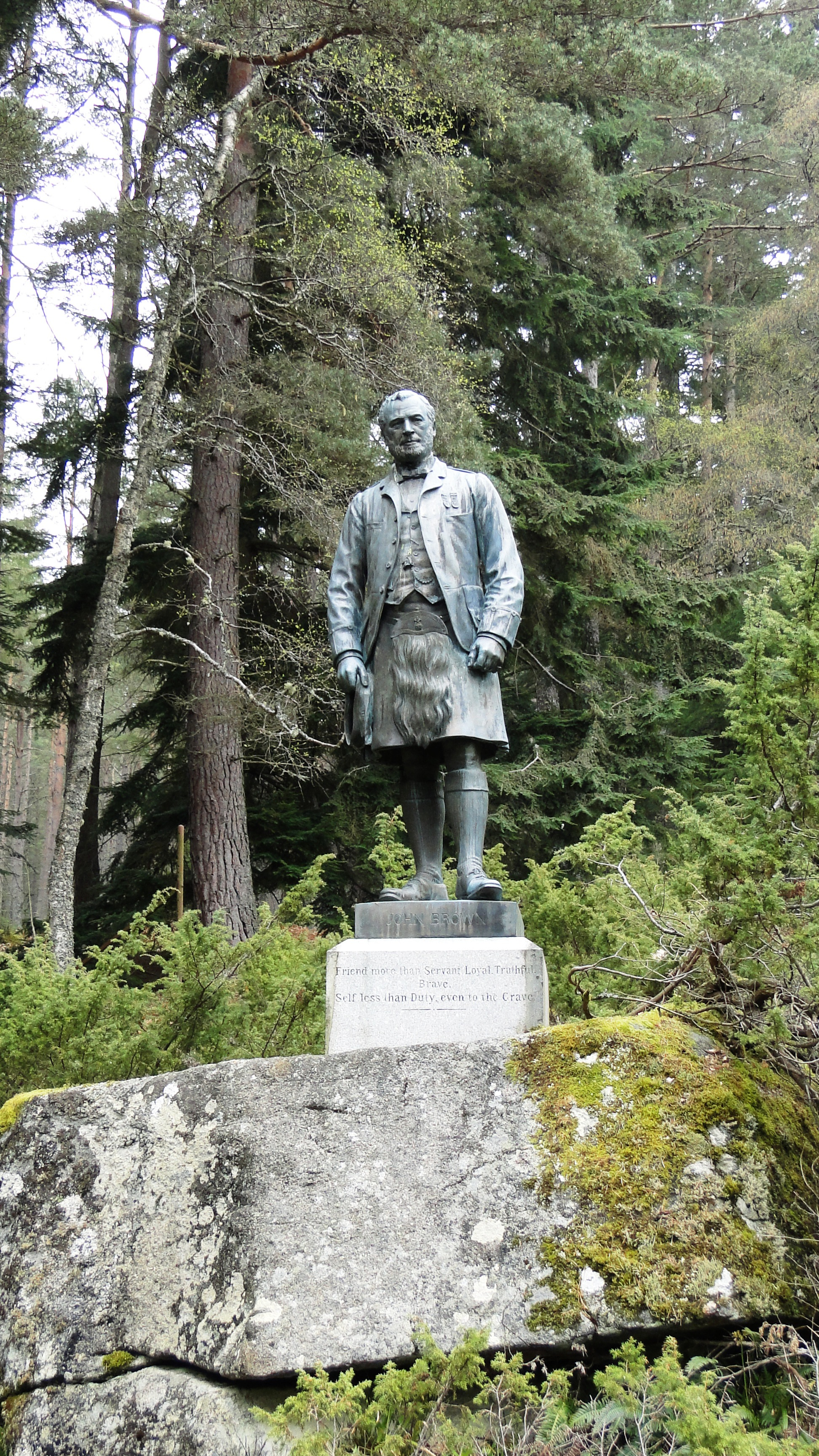
Statue of John Brown in the grounds of Balmoral

"He was the best, truest heart that ever beat," Queen Victoria wrote to Brown's sister-in-law, Jessie McHardy Brown. In a letter to the British poet Alfred Tennyson, from whom she commissioned lines for Brown's tombstone, Victoria eulogised her faithful servant:

He had no thought but for me, my welfare, my comfort, my safety, my happiness. Courageous, unselfish, totally disinterested, discreet to the highest degree, speaking the truth fearlessly and telling me what he thought and considered to be "just and right," without flattery and without saying what would be pleasing if he did not think it right. [...] The comfort of my daily life is gone—the void is terrible—the loss is irreparable!

Queen Victoria commissioned a life-sized statue of Brown by Edgar Boehm shortly after his death. The inscription read: "Friend more than Servant. Loyal. Truthful. Brave. Self less than Duty, even to the Grave." When Victoria's son, Edward VII, succeeded to the throne he had the statue moved to a less conspicuous site.

The statues and private memorials that Victoria had created for Brown were destroyed on the orders of Edward, with whom Brown had often clashed and who resented Brown.

== Honours ==
- Victoria Devoted Service Medal (gold medal, which bears on the reverse, "To John Brown, Esq., in recognition of his presence of mind and devotion at Buckingham Palace, February 29, 1872.")
- Faithful Servant Medal (silver medal, with bar denoting ten additional years of service)

Design and manufacture of both medals were commissioned by Queen Victoria.

- Silver medal (possibly Servant medal), showing the head of Louis III, Grand Duke of Hesse

== In popular culture ==
Gordon McLeod portrayed Brown in Victoria the Great (1937), Sixty Glorious Years (1938) and The Prime Minister (1941).

Gerhard Bienert portrayed Brown in Ohm Kruger (1941).

The 1950 film The Mudlark features Brown at Windsor Castle, portrayed by Finlay Currie.

William Dysart portrayed Brown in the TV series Edward the Seventh (1975).

The 1997 film Mrs Brown is the fictionalised story of John Brown. Sir Billy Connolly portrays Brown and Dame Judi Dench portrays Queen Victoria.

The anime Black Butler (2008–present) features Brown as a recurring character, dubbed in English by Aaron Dismuke.
