= Sir John Wilson, 2nd Baronet =

British philatelist

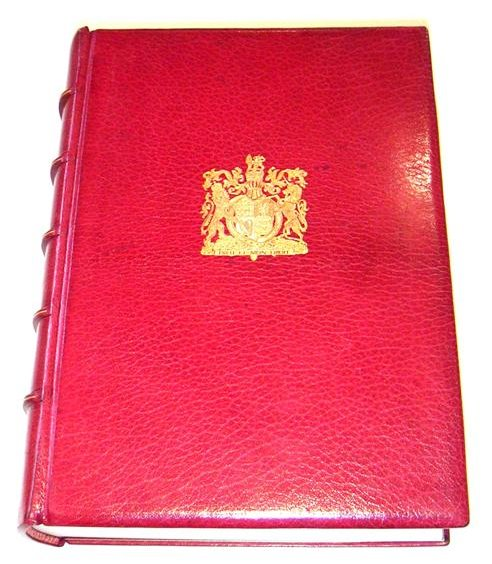
The catalogue of the Royal Philatelic Collection produced by Wilson, published 1952, here shown in the de-luxe leather bound edition out of the slip-case.

Sir John Mitchell Harvey Wilson, 2nd Baronet KCVO (10 October 1898 – 6 February 1975) was a British philatelist and Keeper of the Royal Philatelic Collection from 1938 to 1969. He introduced the division of the collection by reign and, after World War II, loans from the collection to international exhibitions.

== Early life ==
John Wilson was the second Baronet in his family, the title having been received by his father for his contribution to Scottish agriculture. John inherited an estate near Glasgow.

While serving in the Coldstream Guards during the last months of Great War, he was hospitalised in Stirling, Scotland where he first became interested in stamp collecting after his father brought his own collection to help his son pass the time. After the war he was a barrister but retired in the early 1930s to manage his philatelic collection and estate full-time. Generally, he specialised in small countries or in short philatelic periods of a country, studied them, then sold the collection to begin another one.

== The Royal Philatelic Collection ==
Wilson was President of the Royal Philatelic Society London (RPSL) from 1934. In October 1936 he accepted the offer to succeed Edward Bacon, the Curator of the Royal Philatelic Collection. Wilson knew the collection well: he visited it regularly with the RPSL Expert Committee of which he was chairman from 1937 to his death. He became "Keeper of the Royal Philatelic Collection" on 20 June 1938, shortly after Bacon died.

Because King George VI was less enthusiastic than his father, King George V, and had less time available for the Royal Collection, Wilson's first task was to move it upstairs in Buckingham Palace. After a study of the red albums, he established that Bacon had mounted and commented on almost all acquisitions and issues up to the Edward VIII reign. In December 1938 George VI agreed that stamps of his reign be stored in blue albums. As previously, all stamp projects and issues came from the British General Post Office and from its Dominions and colonies.

Wilson's work slowed during World War II because of phlebitis and the storage of the red albums in a safe provided by a Lloyds Bank's subsidiary in Pall Mall but he began work on the first blue albums. With peace re-established and following George VI's wish, the Keeper travelled regularly with stamps from the Collection to present them during international philatelic exhibitions: first the Nevis collection in Bern in 1946, then for the different Dominions' stamp centenaries, and even outside Commonwealth countries during the 1960s.

In 1949 and 1950, Wilson was again elected President of the Royal Philatelic Society; a mandate he had abandoned in 1940, but he remained Chairman of the Expert Committee and prepared the Royal Collection panel for the RPSL annual exhibition. After King George VI died in 1952, he continued, alone like his two predecessors, to build the blue collection and store the issues of Elizabeth II's reign to be mounted at an appropriate future date. He also participated in some stamp advisory meetings where, between 1964 and 1966, he fought against Postmaster General Tony Benn's idea to replace the Queen's effigy on the stamps with the country name.

== Retirement ==
Wilson retired as Keeper of the Royal Collection in 1969 and proposed John Marriott as his successor.

== Publications ==
- The Royal Philatelic Collection, Dropmore Press, 1952. A history of the Royal Philatelic Collection and catalogue of the red albums, mainly collected by King George V, John Tilleard and Edward Bacon. Edited by Clarence Winchester. Awarded the Crawford Medal by the Royal Philatelic Society London in 1953.

== Honours and awards ==
- Knight Commander of the Royal Victorian Order in 1957.
- Tapling Medal in 1950 awarded by the RPSL for an article published by The London Philatelist: "British Guiana, the 1853–60 issues".
- Crawford Medal in 1953 awarded by the RPSL for The Royal Philatelic Collection.
- Alfred Lichtenstein Memorial Award awarded in 1956 by the Collectors Club of New York for his outstanding service to philately.
- Order of Saint Agatha in 1956 awarded by the Republic of San Marino.

Baronetage of the United Kingdom
Preceded by David Wilson	Baronet (of Carbeth); 1930–1975	Succeeded by David Wilson
