= John Alexander Tilleard =

British philatelist

John Alexander Tilleard (born circa 1850, died 22 September 1913) was a British solicitor and the philatelist who was the first curator of the Royal Philatelic Collection.

John Tilleard was a solicitor of the City of London. He spent his free time on collect stamps and the study of philately. He was a specialist of stamps issued by Prince Edward Island and British India. About the latter, he published Notes on the De La Rue Series of Adhesive Postage Stamps and Telegraph Stamps of India published in 1896.

== The Royal Philatelic Collection ==
On the Duke of Edinburgh's initiative, Tilleard met the Duke of York on 28 February 1893. He agreed to become the Duke's advisor to help manage his stamp collection. In a letter, the Duke, later King George V, told Tilleard, "I wish to have the best collection & not one of the best collections in England." George V's biographer, Harold Nicolson, commented that Tilleard was seen at the Duke of York's palace more often than Tanner who taught the future king law and constitutional knowledge.

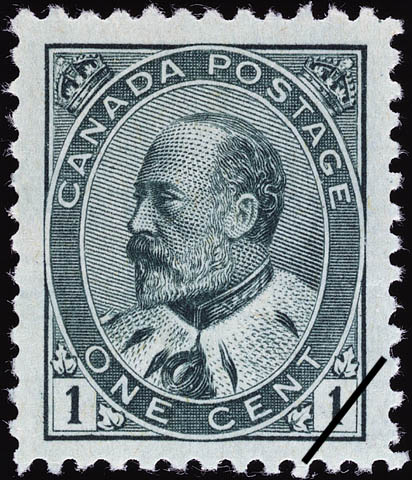
1903 Canada stamp designed by J. A. Tilleard

In 1903, Tilleard and George designed the Canada stamp series figuring King Edward VII, issued between 1903 and 1912.

After the accession of the Duke as King George V in 1910, Tilleard was named "Philatelist to the King" with a yearly 750 pounds salary. The next year the King made him a Member in the Royal Victorian Order (MVO) for his services to the King and philately.

In the history of the Royal Philatelic Collection, Tilleard was the principal force behind George V creating the most comprehensive collection of United Kingdom and Commonwealth stamps in the world. However, at the time of his death, the mounting was still to be done; performing this task was the main success of Tilleard's successor Edward Denny Bacon.

== The Royal Philatelic Society ==
Member of the Philatelic Society, London, he served as honorary secretary from 1894 to 1913. He permitted the participation of two philatelist princes to the Society : Alfred, Duke of Edinburgh, brother of future King Edward VII, elected honorary president in 1890, and Alfred's nephew George, Duke of York.

In 1906, he helped the Philatelic Society, London obtain the "Royal" title, to become the Royal Philatelic Society London whose president was the Duke of York from 1896.

In memory of Tilleard, the Royal Philatelic Society London created the Tilleard Medal, first awarded in 1920 to one (or two, if they are associated) members of the Society for the best philatelic display.

== References and sources ==
Sources

- Nicholas Courtney (2004). The Queen's Stamps. The Authorised History of the Royal Philatelic Collection. Methuen, ISBN 0-413-77228-4.
