= Charles Wyndham Goodwyn =

British philatelist

Charles Wyndham Goodwyn LVO (11 March 1934 – 10 June 2015) was a British philatelist, and was Keeper of the Royal Philatelic Collection from September 1995 to January 2003. He was an expert in the philately of Hong Kong and China.

== Organised philately ==
From 1991 to 1993, he served as president of the Royal Philatelic Society London (RPSL), of which he was elected Honorary Fellow in 1995.

== Royal Philatelic Collection ==
In 1993, he was hired as assistant to John Marriott, the Keeper of the Royal Philatelic Collection. Since the constitution of this collection by King George V, it was the first time its curator was no more alone. In September 1995, Goodwyn replaced Marriott who retired from the post of Keeper.

As Keeper, Goodwyn continued his predecessors' tasks: to mount the British and Commonwealth collection sent by the postal administrations and the purchases made during George VI's and Elizabeth II's reigns, and to exhibit at international stamp shows.

He opened the Collection to postal historians or students whereas only members of the RPSL Expert Committee had regularly been allowed since the time of George V. When he sold, amongst duplicates, the collections of Egypt and of the Suez Canal in 2001 to pay the 250,000 pounds for the Kirkcudbright cover, he reinforced the British Commonwealth specialization of the Royal Collection.

Like Marriott, he sourced assistants, expediting the mounting of the George VI collection. In September 1996, Michael Sefi became adjoint to the Keeper after architect Surésh Dhargalkar was hired as an assistant in April 1996. Not a philatelist, the latter travelled with parts of the collection to exhibition.

Weaker after an Australian exhibition in 1999 and the moving of the Royal Collection from Buckingham Palace to St. James's Palace around 2000, Goodwyn retired in January 2003 and was replaced by Sefi.

== Outside philately ==
Goodwyn had the degree of LLB.

== Honours and awards ==
- Lieutenant of the Royal Victorian Order in 2002.
- Knight of the Ordre de Saint-Charles in Monaco.
- Signed the Roll of Distinguished Philatelists.
- Smithsonian Philatelic Achievement Award in 2002.

== Publications ==
- Royal Reform: postal reform 1837–1841 as reflected in the Royal Philatelic Collection, The Stuart Rossiter Trust, 2000.

== References and sources ==
Sources

- Courtney, Nicholas (2004). The Queen's Stamps. The Authorised History of the Royal Philatelic Collection, éd. Methuen, 2004, ISBN 0-413-77228-4.
