= Edward Denny Bacon =

British philatelist (1860–1938)

Sir Edward Bacon KCVO
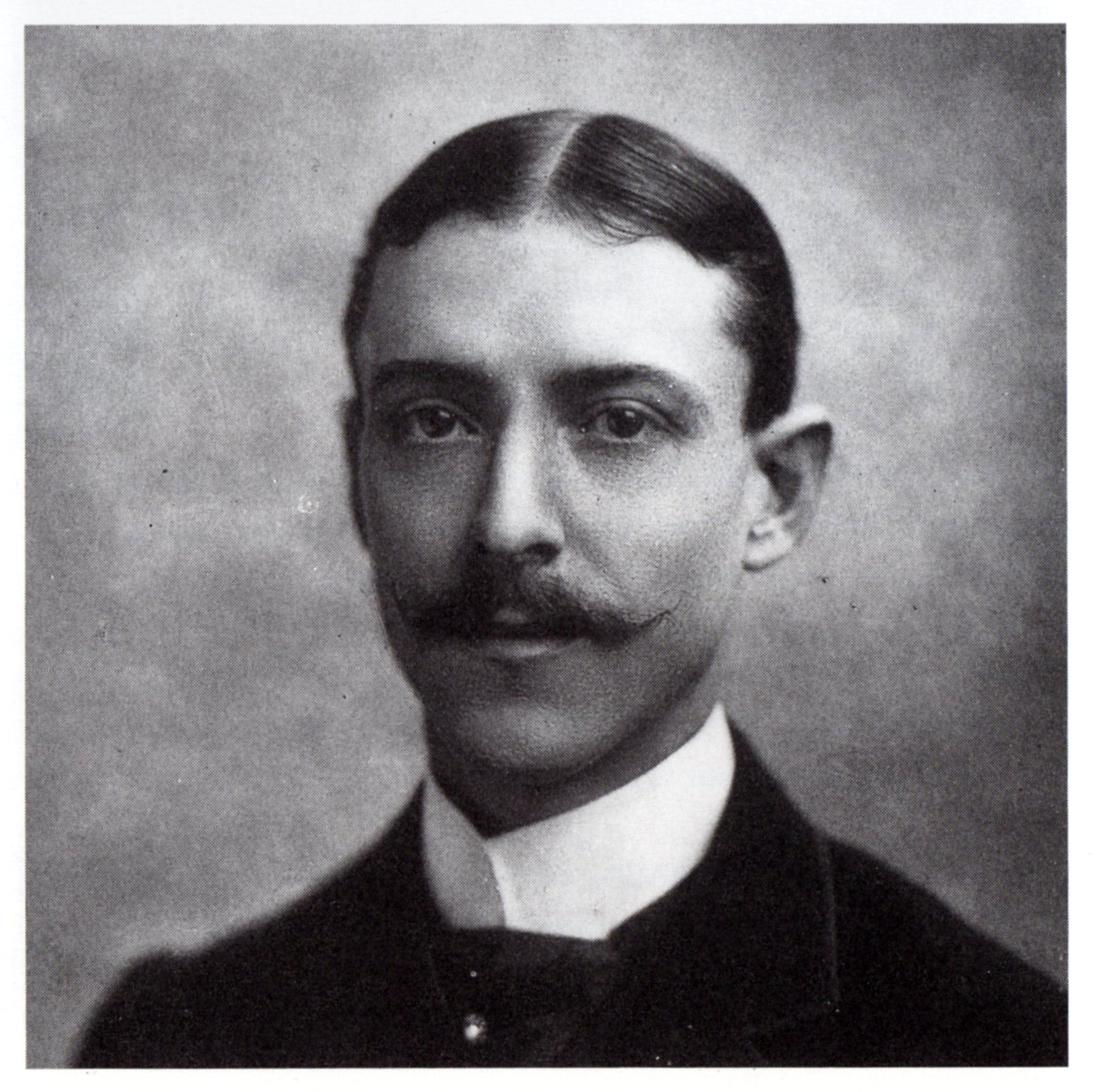
- Edward Denny Bacon, c. 1900
- Born: 29 August 1860
- Died: 5 June 1938 (aged 77)
- Occupation: Philatelist

Sir Edward Denny Bacon KCVO (29 August 1860 – 5 June 1938) was a British philatelist who helped with the enlargement and mounting of collections possessed by rich collectors of his time and became the curator of the Royal Philatelic Collection between 1913 and 1938.

== Early life ==
Edward Bacon was the son of a London malt producer, and worked in his father's factory until its closure in 1895.

== Philately ==
After 1895 he decided to become a full-time philatelist. His two main collections were of Japanese stamps (later acquired by Philipp von Ferrary) and of postal stationery (later in the ownership of Thomas Tapling).

He joined the Philatelic Society, London in 1880, in which he served in all the principal positions. He was elected president in 1917.

He was known to help some British collectors to manage their philatelic possessions. The first one was Thomas Keay Tapling; when Tapling bequeathed his collection to the British Museum, Bacon mounted the ensemble and wrote its description, a task he undertook for an exhibition in February 1897, after Tapling's death in 1891. After that, he managed Henry J. Duveen's collection, and published in 1911 the catalogue of the Crawford Library. In 1907 Bacon was the first President of the Philatelic Literature Society. Bacon was also a member of the Fiscal Philatelic Society.

== The Royal Philatelic Collection ==
A week after John Alexander Tilleard, "Philatelist to the King", died in September 1913, Bacon was invited by King George V to be the Curator of the Royal Philatelic Collection. He accepted and travelled from his residence in Croydon to Buckingham Palace two or three times a week until his death to work on the collection, to buy stamps, to receive items from the post offices in the United Kingdom, and the British Dominions and colonies, and to mount all this in uniform red stamp albums, while Tilleard had accumulated and mounted only when the King was preparing an exhibition at the Royal Philatelic Society London. Nevertheless, John Wilson, Keeper of the Collection after Bacon's death, criticised the way Bacon added new hinges without removing old ones.

Whereas deafness isolated Bacon from the others members of the Royal Court, he alone succeeded in balancing the collection's budget when the King bought a lot and to mount every project, essay and issued stamp received. During World War I, the session in the Stamp Room placed inside Buckingham Palace diverted the King from matters of state and the war, and made him consider the curator as a friend like Tilleard.

After George V's death in January 1936, Bacon continued his tasks on a collection that became part of the royal heritage. Even if Kings Edward VIII and George VI were less enthusiastic stamp collectors than their father, they made sure that all British and colonial postal authorities continued to send philatelic material to the Curator. But Edward VIII ordered that the collection had to be financially self-sufficient, through the sales of duplicate stamps. In July 1936 Bacon was authorised to sell two 500-dollar stamps of the Straits Settlements featuring King Edward VII for 1,000 pounds.

In April 1938 Bacon announced to the King his retirement on the next first of September. John Wilson was quickly chosen because, as President of the Royal Philatelic Society London and chairman of its Expert Committee, he already knew the collection well. However, Bacon died of influenza in June 1938. From 1904 until his death, he lived in Croydon, commuting to work at Buckingham Palace.

== Titles and awards ==
In 1917 Bacon was made a Member of the Royal Victorian Order, then Commander in 1922 and Knight in 1932.

In 1906 he received the first Lindenberg Medal from the Berliner Philatelisten-Klub and was amongst the first to sign the Roll of Distinguished Philatelists with King George V.

== Publications ==
- Saint Vincent: With Notes and Publisher's Prices. Co-Author: Francis H. Napier. London: Stanley Gibbons, 1895.
- The Stamps of Barbados, with a history and description of the star-watermarked papers of Messrs. Perkins Bacon and Co., etc. Co-Author: Francis H. Napier. London: Stanley Gibbons, 1896.
- The Stamp Collector: A treatise on the issue and collecting of the postage stamps of all nations their art, history, and market value, with facsimiles of rare stamps principally from the Tapling collection in the British museum. Co-Author: W.J. Hardy. London: G. Redway, 1898
- Reprints of Postal Adhesive Stamps and Their Characteristics. London: Stanley Gibbons, 1899. (Republished by Lowell Ragatz in 1954 as Reprints of 19th century postal adhesive stamps and their characteristics.)
- Grenada: to which is prefixed an account of the perforations of the Perkins Bacon printed stamps of the British Colonies. Co-Author: Francis H. Napier. London: Stanley Gibbons, 1902.
- The Postage Stamps of the Turks Islands. London: Stanley Gibbons, 1917.
- The Line Engraved Postage Stamps of Great Britain Printed by Perkins, Bacon and Co. Two volumes. London: Chas. Nissen & Co. Ltd., 1920. (Awarded the Crawford Medal in 1921.) Vol. 1, Electronic version here.
- The Essays, Proofs and Reprints of the First Issued Stamps of British India of 1854–55. Lahore: Philatelic Society of India, 1922
- The Stamps of the Electric Telegraph Company (Great Britain): Issues of 1851–1861. London: Chas. Nissen & Co. Ltd., 1927.
- The Stamps of the Pacific Steam Navigation Company printed by Messrs. Perkins, Bacon & Co.. London: W. Brendon & Son, 1928?
- Catalogue of Lord Crawford's philatelic library :
  - Bibliotheca Lindesiana. Vol. VII: A Bibliography of the Writings General, Special and Periodical Forming the Literature of Philately. Aberdeen: Aberdeen University Press, 1911. 462p. 200 copies were printed for libraries and bibliophiles.
  - Reprinted as The Catalogue of the Philatelic Library of the Earl of Crawford, K.T. London: Philatelic Literature Society, 1911. 300 books printed.
  - A supplement was published in 1926 (68p.), then an eight-page addenda in The London Philatelist in 1938.
  - Catalogue of the Crawford Library of philatelic literature at the British Library. Fishkill, N.Y.: Printer's Stone in association with the British Library, 1991 ISBN 0-941480-10-0, 560 pages.

== References and sources ==
Sources

- Nicholas Courtney (2004). The Queen's Stamps. The Authorised History of the Royal Philatelic Collection, Methuen, ISBN 0-413-77228-4, pages 135–152.
- Shamash, Jack (2013). George V's Obsession: A King and His Stamps. Kindle edition. Available on Amazon Kindle.
