= George Ashley Maude =

British Army officer

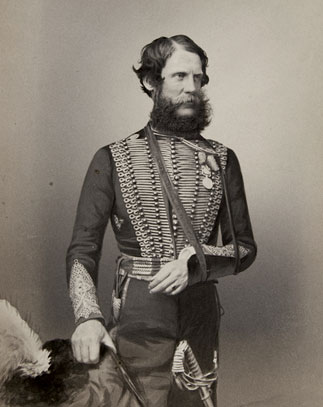
Colonel Sir George Ashley Maude.

Colonel Sir George Ashley Maude, KCB (11 November 1817 – 31 May 1894) was a British army officer and Crown Equerry to Queen Victoria.

== Eiography ==
Born in 1817, he was the son of the Rev. Hon. John Charles Maude, of Enniskillen, Ireland, and Mary, daughter of William Cely Trevilian. His paternal grandparents were Cornwallis Maude, 1st Viscount Hawarden, and his third wife, Anne Isabella Monck, sister of Charles Monck, 1st Viscount Monck.

Maude was educated at Sherborne School and entered the Royal Horse Artillery in 1834, which he later commanded as Colonel. He served in the battles of Alma and Balaklava, and took part in the Siege of Sebastopol.

As Lieutenant-Colonel, he was military assistant to the British mission attending the coronation of Tsar Alexander II of Russia in 1856, which was led by Lord Granville. He was Deputy-Inspector to the Royal Irish Constabulary from 1858 to 1859, and was appointed Crown Equerry of the Royal Mews in the Royal Household in 1859.

He was appointed a Knight Commander of the Order of the Bath (KCB) in 1887.

== Family ==
In 1845 Maude married Katherine Katinka Beauclerk, youngest daughter of Charles Beauclerk, of St Leonard's Lodge, Horsham, Sussex. Through her father, Katherine was the granddaughter of Lady Diana Beauclerk, daughter of the Duke of Marlborough].

Maude and his wife had six children:

- Emily Diana Frances Maude (1846–1926) was baptized on 25 December 1845 at Halls. She later married Jonathan Peel Baird, the son of Sir David Baird, 2nd Baronet
- Charles John Maude (1847−1910), who married Sarah Maria Pell, daughter of Sir Watkin Owen Pell
- Eustace Downman Maude (1848−1930), naval officer, who married Amy Williams
- Ashley Henry Maude (1850−1933), who married Emma Constance Henry
- Aubrey Maurice Maude (1852−1943), army officer, who married Amy Florence Lucas, sister of Sir Arthur Lucas, 2nd Baronet
- Alwyne Edward Maude (1854−1945), army officer, who married first Katharine Lucy Campbell (d. 1892), then Louise Caroline Silfestrom
- Frederick William Maude (1857−1923), Baron of the Cinque Ports, who married Ellen Maud Kelk, daughter of Sir John Kelk, 1st Baronet
