= Michael Sefi =

British philatelist (1943–2026)

Michael Sefi LVO, FRPSL, RDP
- Born: 11 December 1943; London, England
- Died: 9 May 2026 (aged 82)
- Occupation: Keeper of the Royal Philatelic Collection

Academic work
- Discipline: Philatelist

Michael Richard Sefi LVO, RDP, FRPSL (11 December 1943 – 9 May 2026) was a British philatelist who was the Keeper of the Royal Philatelic Collection from 1 January 2003 until his retirement in September 2018.

== Life and career ==
Sefi was born in London on 11 December 1943. When he was a child, his grandfather introduced him to stamp collecting. He began collecting stamps again in his early thirties when his own children received stamps and stamp albums as a gift and while he was looking for a hobby to ease the stress from the Mann Judd and Touche Ross merger. He specialised in collecting the first postage stamps of George V's reign. He was educated at Downside School

He worked as a chartered accountant until he partially retired in 1983. He was a partner of Mann Judd, later Touche Ross, [later Deloitte] in the 1970s. He became an active member of the Great Britain Philatelic Society of which he was president between 2000/02 and 2012/14. Sefi was a member of Council of the Royal Philatelic Society London between 1990 and 2005 where he was a member of many decision-making bodies.

In September 1996, he was hired as deputy to the Keeper of the Royal Philatelic Collection, who was Charles Goodwyn. He helped him accelerate the mounting of the George VI postage stamp collection. Sefi participated in international philatelic exhibitions of parts of the Royal Philatelic Collection and in welcoming students and researchers. He played a major role in the move of the collection from Buckingham Palace to St James's Palace in 1999.

When Charles Goodwyn announced his retirement in late 2002, Sefi was chosen to succeed him among three other candidates by the Keeper of the Privy Purse.

Sefi retired as Keeper of the Royal Philatelic Collection in September 2018.

He directed the preparations of The Queen's Own, a Royal Collection exhibit at the National Postal Museum in Washington, D.C., which was held in 2004. To assist Sefi, he had the help of Surésh Dhargalkar, an architect and conservation specialist, who was Sefi's assistant from 2003. To help him for the mounting, he hired George VI specialist, Rod Vousden, as assistant.

Sefi died from lung and heart disease on 9 May 2026, at the age of 82. His funeral was held on 29 May 2026 at Arundel Cathedral.

== Honours ==
- Appointed Lieutenant of the Royal Victorian Order (LVO) in the 2013 Queen's Birthday Honours List.
- Signatory to the Roll of Distinguished Philatelists (RDP) in 2013.
- Fellow of the Royal Philatelic Society London (FRPSL).

== References and sources ==
Sources

- Courtney, Nicholas (2004). The Queen's Stamps, The Authorised History of the Royal Philatelic Collection, éd. Methuen, 2004, ISBN 0-413-77228-4.
