= Royal Philatelic Collection =

Postage stamp collection of the British Royal Family

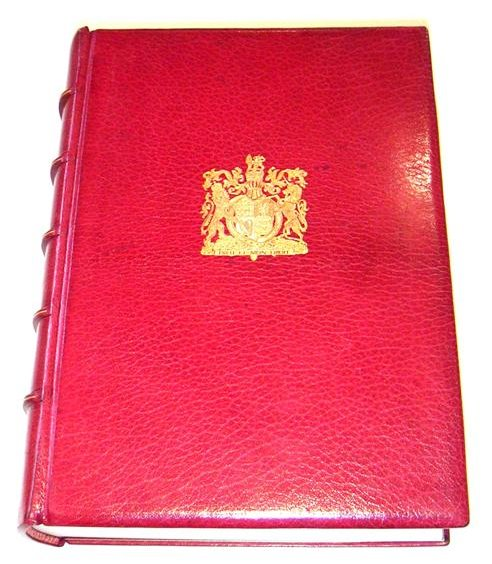
The catalogue of the collection, published 1952, here shown in the deluxe leather bound edition out of the slip-case.

The Royal Philatelic Collection is the postage stamp collection of the British royal family. It is the most comprehensive collection of items related to the philately of the United Kingdom and the British Commonwealth, with many unique pieces. Of major items, only the British Guiana 1c magenta is missing from the collection of British Imperial stamps.

In 2020, the value of the collection was estimated by The Daily Telegraph to be £100 million.

== Early history ==
Some members of the royal family are known to have been collecting stamps by 1864, just under twenty-five years after their introduction in 1840. The first serious collector in the family was Prince Alfred, who sold his collection to his older brother Edward, Prince of Wales, who in turn gave it to his son, later George V.

== George V ==
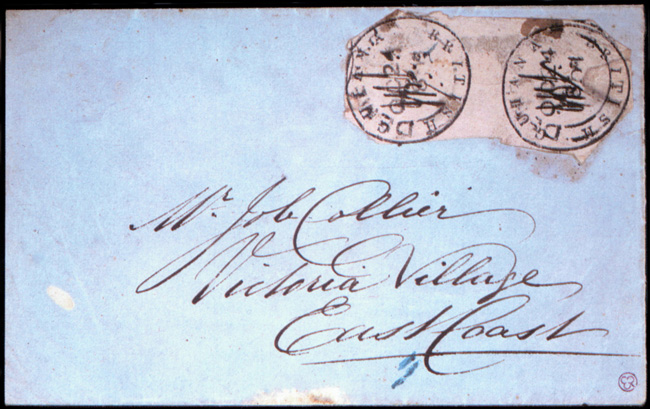
The 1850 British Guiana 2c pink cottonreel stamps on cover, formerly in the Luard collection, now in the Royal Philatelic Collection.

George V was one of the notable philatelists of his day. In 1893, as the Duke of York, he was elected honorary vice-president of what became the Royal Philatelic Society of London. On his marriage that year, fellow members of the society gave him an album of nearly 1,500 postage stamps as a wedding present. He expanded the collection with a number of high-priced purchases of rare stamps and covers. His 1904 purchase of the Mauritius two pence blue for £1,450 set a new record for a single stamp. A courtier asked the prince if he had seen "that some damned fool had paid as much as £1,400 for one stamp". "Yes," George replied. "I was that damned fool!"

George V had the collection housed in 328 so-called "Red Albums", each of about 60 pages. Later additions included a set of "Blue Albums" for the reign of George VI and "Green Albums" for those of Elizabeth II.

== Management of the collection ==
The collection was kept at Buckingham Palace until it was moved to St James's Palace, also in London. In 1952, a catalogue of the collection was published, prepared by Sir John Wilson, and edited by Clarence Winchester. It was available in a deluxe leather-bound edition or a regular cloth-bound edition.

Items from the Royal Philatelic Collection have been regularly shown to the public by the Royal Philatelic Society London or are lent to international philatelic exhibitions.

The Privy Purse and Treasurer's Office has overall responsibility for the Collection, as a department of the Royal Household.

== Keepers and curators ==
Since the 1890s, successive monarchs have employed curators to assist with the management of the collection.

John Tilleard was the first person to manage the collection from the 1890s until his death in 1913, with the title of "Philatelist to the King". Tilleard was followed by Edward Denny Bacon who became "curator" of the collection from 1913 to 1938, when he died just prior to retirement. He started to organize the collection in a comprehensive manner. Bacon was succeeded by John Wilson, then president of Royal Philatelic Society London, with the title of "keeper" and served until 1969. He introduced the coloured albums to keep intact the work of Bacon. He prepared the first loans for exhibitions after World War II.

The last three keepers of the Royal Philatelic Collection have been John Marriott (1969–1995), Charles Wyndham Goodwyn (1995–2002), and Michael Sefi from 1 January 2003 to 2018.

There has been no official keeper since 2019, when the Collection was moved back to Buckingham Palace. It has been kept secure and largely unattended since the beginning of the COVID-19 pandemic.
