= Royal Victorian Medal =

British decoration

- Obverse and reverse (silver medal)
- Type: Decoration
- Awarded for: Personal service to the Sovereign or royal family
- Eligibility: British and Commonwealth citizens and non-commissioned personnel
- Post-nominals: RVM
- Status: Currently awarded
- Established: April 1896
- Ribbon of the medal

Precedence
- Next (higher): Dependent on realm
- Next (lower): Dependent on realm

The Royal Victorian Medal (RVM) is a decoration established by Queen Victoria in April 1896. A part of the Royal Victorian Order, it is a reward for personal service to the Sovereign or the royal family, and is the personal gift of the Sovereign. It differs from other grades of the order in appearance and in the way it is worn.

The medal has three levels – bronze, silver, and gold. Medal bars may be awarded to each level of medal to denote subsequent awards. Recipients may continue to wear their original medal if they are awarded a higher level for further service. The medal may also be worn in addition to the insignia of the Royal Victorian Order if the latter is subsequently awarded. Recipients are entitled to use the post-nominal letters RVM.

Awards are announced in The Gazette.

== History ==
In creating the Royal Victorian Order in 1896, Queen Victoria decided to include a medal as part of this dynastic order. The medal would be used to reward those who had rendered faithful service to the monarch or the royal family, but were deemed ineligible to be appointed to any orders of chivalry because of their social position or class. This creation followed the precedent of other European monarchs, who had royal household medals with which to reward domestic servants.

The first medals were received on 7 July 1896 and were presented to Russians by the Duke of Connaught while he was in Russia for the coronation of Tsar Nicholas II. On 14 May 1912, King George V further confirmed the institution of the medal with an additional royal warrant.

The medal has been historically used to recognise the service of police officers, who work in protective services, as well as gardeners, housekeepers, drivers, valets, and other similar type of staff. Non-commissioned members of the military may also be awarded the medal for services. It is often given for service to the monarch or royal family during royal visits. The medal may be looked upon as a long service medal, but the service must be of a meritorious character to warrant its award.

Originally ranked near the end, the medal now ranks ahead of campaign, jubilee, efficiency, and long service medals in the United Kingdom Order of Wear. This gradual increase in importance was marked by the July 1980 approval, by Queen Elizabeth II, to allow the use of the postnominal RVM by recipients of the medal.

== Description ==
The medal is circular and 28 mm in diameter. It is struck in bronze, silver, or silver-gilt (for the gold medal). The obverse bears the effigy of a young Queen Elizabeth II. Surrounding the effigy is the inscription Elizabeth II Dei Gratia Regina F D. The reverse depicts the royal cypher, surrounded by a wreath or ribbons and laurel leaves. A curled ribbon at the bottom bears the inscription Royal Victorian Medal.

Attached by a ring suspension, the medal is borne by a blue ribbon with thin stripes of white and red on each edge. Awards to foreigners have a white central stripe. The ribbon is the same as that of the Royal Victorian Order. Additional awards of the medal are indicated by bars attached to the ribbon.

== Precedence ==
Some orders of precedence are as follows:

Country	Preceding	Following
(Australia) Australia; Order of precedence	Australian Antarctic Medal; King's Gallantry Medal (Pre 1992)	Commendation for Gallantry; British Empire Medal (Pre 1992)
(Canada) Canada; Order of precedence	Meritorious Service Medal	Sacrifice Medal
(New Zealand) New Zealand; Order of precedence	New Zealand Bravery Medal	King's Service Medal
(United Kingdom) United Kingdom; Order of precedence	King's Gallantry Medal	British Empire Medal

== See also ==
- Royal Victorian Chain
