= Arthur Erskine =

British soldier and courtier (1881–1963)

Colonel Sir Arthur Erskine GCVO DSO
- Born: 1 September 1881
- Died: 24 July 1963 (aged 81)
- Education: Royal Military Academy, Woolwich
- Military career
- Allegiance: United Kingdom
- Branch: British Army
- Rank: Colonel
- Conflicts: First World War

Colonel Sir Arthur Edward Erskine GCVO DSO (1 September 1881 – 24 July 1963) was a British soldier and courtier. He was Crown Equerry in the royal household of the Sovereign of the United Kingdom from 1924 to 1941.

== Background and education ==
A member of Clan Erskine, Erskine was the fifth son of Sir David Erskine, Serjeant-at-Arms of the House of Commons, by Lady Horatia Elizabeth, daughter of Francis Seymour, 5th Marquess of Hertford. He was a descendant of the noted 18th-century jurist John Erskine of Carnock and the nephew of Admiral of the Fleet Sir James Erskine. He was educated at Charterhouse and at the Royal Military Academy, Woolwich.

== Career ==
Erskine fought in the First World War, where he was mentioned in dispatches and awarded the DSO in 1916.

From 1919 to 1924 he was an Equerry to the King. He served in the Royal Artillery until 1924, when he became Crown Equerry in the royal household of the Sovereign. From his retirement in 1941 until his death, he was an Extra Equerry. From 1939 to 1963 he was Secretary and Registrar of the Order of Merit, and from 1941 to 1946 Secretary of the Ascot Authority.

He was appointed to the Royal Victorian Order as a Commander (CVO) in the 1926 New Year Honours, promoted to Knight Commander (KCVO) in the 1931 Birthday Honours and to Knight Grand Cross (GCVO) in the 1935 Birthday Honours.

== Family ==
Erskine married Rosemary Freda, daughter of Brigadier-General Edward William David Baird, in 1921. They had three sons, of whom the youngest was the polar explorer Angus Erskine. The oldest son, Donald Seymour Erskine married Catherine Annandale McLelland in 1953 and together they have five children, four daughters and a son. Their son, Major James Malcolm Kenneth Erskine MBE, attended Wellington College, Berkshire and then became an officer in the Black Watch (Royal Highland Regiment). Erskine died in July 1963, aged 81. Lady Erskine died in January 1970.
