= Seymour Gilbart-Denham =

British Army officer and courtier (1939–2018)

Sir Seymour Vivian Gilbart-Denham, KCVO (1939–2018) was a British army officer and courtier.

Born on 10 October 1939, Gilbart-Denham was the son of Major Vivian Maurice Gilbart-Denham and his wife, Diana Mary, daughter of Henry Ralph Beaumont, JP, and maternal granddaughter of Sir James Gibson-Craig, 3rd Baronet. Vivian Gilbart-Denham was an officer in the Irish Guards and was killed in action in 1940; he was the son of Sir James Denham. Seymour Gilbart-Denham had two brothers: Desmond James Beaumont (born 1930) and Brian John (born 1934).

Gilbart-Denham was educated at Ludgrove School and then Tabley House School, which he enjoyed, becoming head boy. After leaving school, he joined the Household Cavalry and served as a trooper in Cyprus in 1958. He then trained at Mons Officer Cadet School and was commissioned into the Life Guards in 1960 as a 2nd lieutenant. He was posted in Germany (1960–62) and then as Troop Leader in London (1962–64), before returning to Cyprus to support the UN. He returned to Windsor and was appointed adjutant in 1965 and promoted to the rank of captain the following year. He went with the regiment to Southeast Asia; in 1967, he ceased to be Adjutant and was appointed second-in-command in Arthur Gooch's squadron stationed in Hong Kong. In 1968, he returned to Windsor and served in Northern Ireland the following year. In 1971, he was placed in command of the Household Cavalry Training Squadron. He returned to Northern Ireland for a third tour in 1973. According to an obituary, he was promoted to major in 1971, but The London Gazette's notice dates it to 1974. He then spent periods in the United Kingdom and Germany, before becoming a staff officer in 1981. He subsequently served at Headquarters 33rd Armoured Brigade, Headquarters 4th Armoured Division (as an SO2) and with United Kingdom Land Forces.

In 1986, he was promoted to lieutenant-colonel and took command of the Household Cavalry Regiment. The following year, he was appointed Crown Equerry, an office in which he served until retiring in 2002. Having been appointed a commander of the Royal Victorian Order in the 1994 New Year Honours, he was promoted to Knight Commander in July 2002. He continued to be an extra equerry in retirement and died on 19 June 2018.
